= Coordination geometry =

Term used in chemistry

The coordination geometry of an atom is the geometrical pattern defined by the atoms around the central atom. The term is commonly applied in the field of inorganic chemistry, where diverse structures are observed. The coordination geometry depends on the number, not the type, of ligands bonded to the metal centre as well as their locations. The number of atoms bonded is the coordination number. The geometrical pattern can be described as a polyhedron where the vertices of the polyhedron are the centres of the coordinating atoms in the ligands.

The coordination preference of a metal often varies with its oxidation state. The number of coordination bonds (coordination number) can vary from two in K[Ag(CN)_{2}] as high as 20 in Th(η^{5}-C_{5}H_{5})_{4}.

One of the most common coordination geometries is octahedral, where six ligands are coordinated to the metal in a symmetrical distribution, leading to the formation of an octahedron if lines were drawn between the ligands. Other common coordination geometries are tetrahedral and square planar.

Crystal field theory may be used to explain the relative stabilities of transition metal compounds of different coordination geometry, as well as the presence or absence of paramagnetism, whereas VSEPR may be used for complexes of main group element to predict geometry.

== Crystallography usage ==
In a crystal structure the coordination geometry of an atom is the geometrical pattern of coordinating atoms where the definition of coordinating atoms depends on the bonding model used. For example, in the rock salt ionic structure each sodium atom has six near neighbour chloride ions in an octahedral geometry and each chloride has similarly six near neighbour sodium ions in an octahedral geometry. In metals with the body centred cubic (bcc) structure each atom has eight nearest neighbours in a cubic geometry. In metals with the face centred cubic (fcc) structure each atom has twelve nearest neighbours in a cuboctahedral geometry.

== Table of coordination geometries ==
A table of the coordination geometries encountered is shown below with examples of their occurrence in complexes found as discrete units in compounds and coordination spheres around atoms in crystals (where there is no discrete complex).

Coordination number	Geometry	Examples of discrete (finite) complex	Examples in crystals (infinite solids)
2	linear	[Ag(CN)_{2}]^{−} in K[Ag(CN)_{2}]	Ag in silver cyanide, Au in AuI
3	trigonal planar	[HgI_{3}]^{−}	O in TiO_{2} rutile structure
4	tetrahedral	[CoCl_{4}]^{2−}	Zn and S in zinc sulfide, Si in silicon dioxide
4	square planar	[AgF_{4}]^{−}	CuO
5	trigonal bipyramidal	[SnCl_{5}]^{−}	
5	square pyramidal	[InCl_{5}]^{2−} in [N(CH_{2}CH_{3})_{4}]_{2}[InCl_{5}]	
6	octahedral	[Fe(H_{2}O)_{6}]^{2+}	Na and Cl in NaCl
6	trigonal prismatic	W(CH_{3})_{6}	As in NiAs, Mo in MoS_{2}
7	pentagonal bipyramidal	[ZrF_{7}]^{3−} in [NH_{4}]_{3}[ZrF_{7}]	Pa in PaCl_{5}
7	capped octahedral	[MoF_{7}]^{−}	La in A-La_{2}O_{3}
7	capped trigonal prismatic	[TaF_{7}]^{2−} in K_{2}[TaF_{7}]	
8	square antiprismatic	[TaF_{8}]^{3−} in Na_{3}[TaF_{8}] [Zr(H_{2}O)_{8}]^{4+} aqua complex	Thorium(IV) iodide
8	dodecahedral (note: whilst this is the term generally used, the correct term is "bisdisphenoid" or "snub disphenoid" as this polyhedron is a deltahedron)	[Mo(CN)_{8}]^{4−} in K_{4}[Mo(CN)_{8}]·2H_{2}O	Zr in K_{2}[ZrF_{6}]
8	bicapped trigonal prismatic	[ZrF_{8}]^{4−}	PuBr_{3}
8	cubic	[PaF_{8}]^{3−} in Na_{3}PaF_{8}	Caesium chloride, calcium fluoride
8	hexagonal bipyramidal		N in Li_{3}N
8	octahedral, trans-bicapped		Ni in nickel arsenide, NiAs; 6 As neighbours + 2 Ni capping
8	trigonal prismatic, triangular face bicapped		Ca in CaFe_{2}O_{4}
9	tricapped trigonal prismatic	[ReH_{9}]^{2−} in potassium nonahydridorhenate [Th(H_{2}O)_{9}]^{4+} aqua complex	SrCl_{2}·6H_{2}O, Th in Rb[Th_{3}F_{13}]
9	capped square antiprismatic	[Th(tropolonate)_{4}(H_{2}O)]	La in LaTe_{2}
10	bicapped square antiprismatic	[Th(C_{2}O_{4})_{4}]^{2−}	
10	bicapped cubic		Th in Th(C_{2}O_{4})_{2}·6H_{2}O
11		Th in [Th^{IV}(NO_{3})_{4}(H_{2}O)_{3}] ([NO_{3}]^{−} is bidentate)	
12	icosahedron	Th in [Th(NO_{3})_{6}]^{2−} ion in Mg[Th(NO_{3})_{6}]·8H_{2}O	
12	cuboctahedron	Zr^{IV}(η^{3}-[BH_{4}]_{4})	atoms in fcc metals e.g. Ca
12	anticuboctahedron (triangular orthobicupola)		atoms in hcp metals e.g. Sc
12	bicapped hexagonal antiprismatic	U[BH_{4}]_{4}	

== Naming of inorganic compounds ==
IUPAC have introduced the polyhedral symbol as part of their IUPAC nomenclature of inorganic chemistry 2005 recommendations to describe the geometry around an atom in a compound.
IUCr have proposed a symbol which is shown as a superscript in square brackets in the chemical formula. For example, CaF_{2} would be Ca^{[8cb]}F_{2}^{[4t]}, where [8cb] means cubic coordination and [4t] means tetrahedral. The equivalent symbols in IUPAC are CU−8 and T−4 respectively.
The IUPAC symbol is applicable to complexes and molecules whereas the IUCr proposal applies to crystalline solids.

== See also ==
- Molecular geometry
- VSEPR theory
- Ligand field theory
- Cis effect
- Addition to pi ligands
