= Octafluoride =

Compound with 8 fluorine atoms

An octafluoride is a compound or ion with the formula [M_{m}R_{n}F_{8}]^{q−} or [M_{m}R_{n}F_{8}]^{q+}, where n, m and q are independent variables and R any substituent and M is a central element (often a metal). All of the examples listed below are [MF_{8}]^{q−} with q between 1 and 4 inclusive.

== Neutral octafluorides ==
No electrically neutral octafluorides are currently known to exist, although osmium octafluoride, OsF_{8}, is theoretically possible. Osmium octafluoride was first reported in 1913, but in 1958 that compound was shown to be actually osmium hexafluoride. A 1993 theoretical study predicted very weak bonds in osmium octafluoride and said that it would be difficult to ever detect experimentally. The study predicted that, if made, OsF_{8} would have Os–F bonds of two different lengths.

Xenon octafluoride could probably never be synthesized. This appears to be due to the steric hindrance of the fluorine atoms around the xenon atom. However, scientists continue to try to synthesize it.

== Anionic octafluorides ==
In contrast, many anionic octafluorides are known, such as the octafluorozirconate(IV) ([ZrF_{8}]^{4−}), octafluorotantalate(V) ([TaF_{8}]^{3−}), octafluoroniobate(V) ([NbF_{8}]^{3−}), octafluoromolybdate(VI) ([MoF_{8}]^{2−}), octafluorotungstate(VI) ([WF_{8}]^{2−}), octafluororhenate(VII) ([ReF_{8}]^{−}), octafluoroiodate(VII) ([IF_{8}]^{−}), octafluoroiridate(VII) ([IrF_{8}]^{−}), and octafluoroxenate(VI) ([XeF_{8}]^{2−}) anions.
