= Biaugmented triangular prism =

Triangular prism attached by two square pyramids

- Type: Johnson; J_{49} – J_{50} – J_{51}
- Faces: 10 triangles 1 square
- Edges: 17
- Vertices: 8
- Vertex configuration: $2 \times 3^5 + 2 \times 3^4 + 4 \times 3^3 \times 4$
- Symmetry group: $C_{2\mathrm{v}}$
- Dihedral angle (degrees): triangle-triangle: 109.5°, 144.7°, 169.5° triangle-square: 90°, 114.7°
- Properties: convex, composite

Net
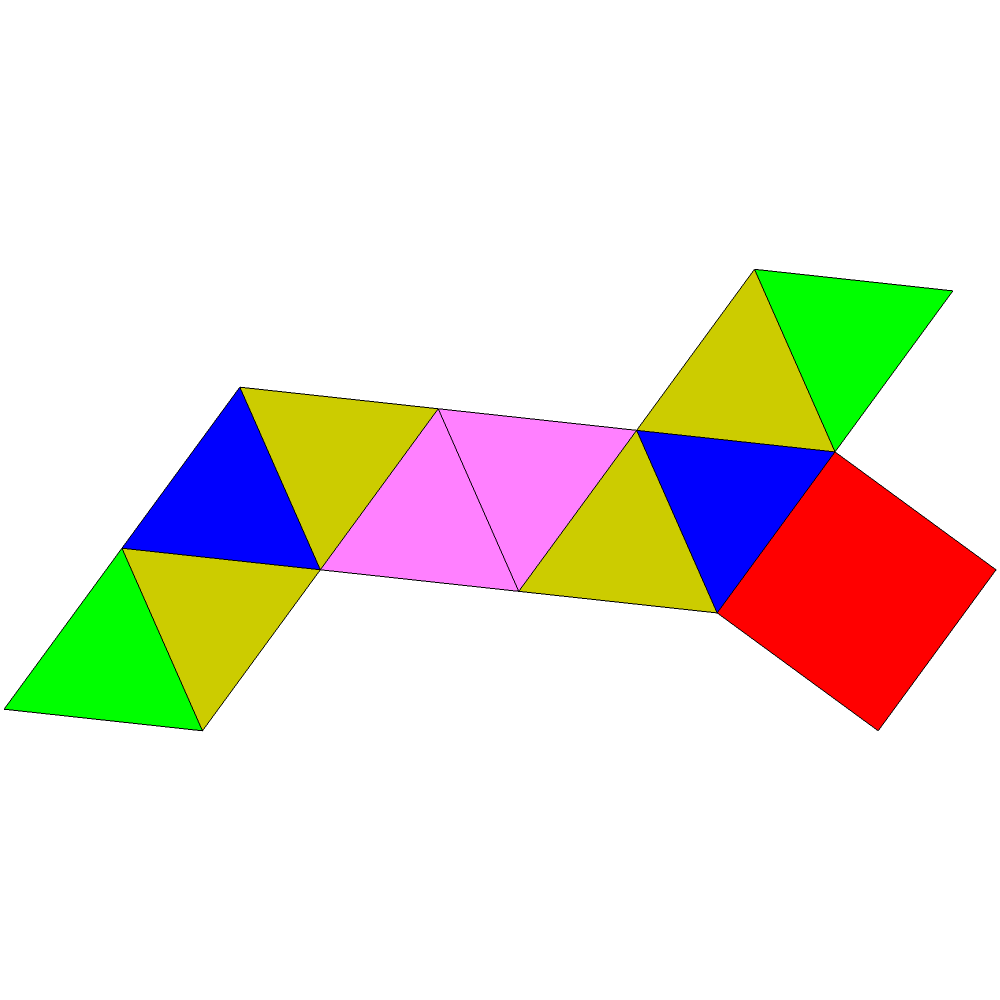

The biaugmented triangular prism is a polyhedron constructed from a triangular prism by attaching two equilateral square pyramids onto two of its square faces. It is an example of a Johnson solid and of a composite polyhedron. It can be found in stereochemistry as a structural chemical compound called the bicapped trigonal prismatic molecular geometry.

== Construction ==
The biaugmented triangular prism is constructed by attaching two equilateral square pyramids to the faces of a triangular prism; this prism is uniform, having the faces shaped as two equilateral triangles and three squares. These pyramids cover two square faces with eight triangles, resulting in a polyhedron with seventeen faces in total: ten equilateral triangles and one square. The process of construction is known as an augmentation, having two pyramids gives the prefix "bi-". In addition, the resulting polyhedron also has seventeen edges and eight vertices. The biaugmented triangular prism is classified as a Johnson solid, after American mathematician Norman W. Johnson, who listed the 92 convex polyhedra with regular polygonal faces. Specifically, it is enumerated within this classification as $J_{50}$, marking the 50th Johnson solid.

Related to the aforementioned construction, the biaugmented triangular prism is composite. A polyhedron is said to be composite if, when being sliced by a plane, the pieces result in two or more convex polyhedra with regular polygonal faces. When the biaugmented triangular prism is sliced by a plane, the result is an equilateral square pyramid and an augmented triangular prism, another Johnson solid and a composite polyhedron. Slicing the augmented triangular prism by a plane produces a uniform triangular prism and an equilateral square pyramid again. Thus, the biaugmented triangular prism can be sliced into two equilateral square pyramids and a uniform triangular prism, three of which are non-composite or elementary polyhedra.

== Properties ==
A biaugmented triangular prism has a surface area $A$ calculated by adding ten equilateral triangles and one square's area: $A = 10T + S$. The area of an equilateral triangle and of a square are $T = \frac{\sqrt{3}}{4}a^2$ and $S = a^2$, respectively, where $a$ is the edge length. All edges of the biaugmented triangular prism are equal in length. The biaugmented triangular prism's surface area is then:
$$A = 10\left(\frac{\sqrt{3}}{4}a^2\right) + a^2 = \frac{5\sqrt{3} + 2}{2}a^2 \approx 5.330a^2.$$

The volume of a biaugmented triangular prism $V$ is obtained by slicing it into a regular triangular prism and two equilateral square pyramids, and adding their volumes subsequently. The volumes of a triangular prism and pyramid are $\frac{\sqrt{3}}{4}a^3$ and $\frac{\sqrt{2}}{6}a^3$, respectively. Therefore, the volume of a biaugmanted triangular prism is:
$$V = \frac{\sqrt{3}}{4}a^3 + 2\left(\frac{\sqrt{2}}{6}a^3\right) = \frac{3\sqrt{3} + 4\sqrt{2}}{12}a^3 \approx 0.904a^3.$$

3D model of a biaugmented triangular prism

The biaugmented triangular prism has three-dimensional symmetry group of two-fold pyramidal symmetry $C_{2\mathrm{v}}$ of order 4. Its dihedral angle (i.e., the angle between two polygonal faces) can be calculated by adding the angle of an equilateral square pyramid and a regular triangular prism in the following:

- The dihedral angle of a biaugmented triangular prism between two adjacent triangles is that of an equilateral square pyramid between two adjacent triangular faces, $\arccos \left(-1/3 \right) \approx 109.5^\circ$
- The dihedral angle of a biaugmented triangular prism between square and triangle is the dihedral angle of a triangular prism between the base and its lateral face, $\pi/2 = 90^\circ$
- The dihedral angle of an equilateral square pyramid between a triangular face and its base is $\arctan \left(\sqrt{2}\right) \approx 54.7^\circ$. The dihedral angle of a triangular prism between two adjacent square faces is the internal angle of an equilateral triangle $\pi/3 = 60^\circ$. Therefore, the dihedral angle of a biaugmented triangular prism between a square (the lateral face of the triangular prism) and a triangle (the lateral face of the equilateral square pyramid), on the edge where the equilateral square pyramid is attached to the square face of the triangular prism, is
  $$\arctan \left(\sqrt{2}\right) + \frac{\pi}{3} \approx 114.7^\circ,$$
  and the dihedral angle between two adjacent triangles (the lateral face of both equilateral square pyramids), on the edge where two equilateral square pyramids are attached adjacently to the triangular prism, is
  $$2 \arctan \left(\sqrt{2}\right) + \frac{\pi}{3} \approx 169.5^\circ.$$
- The dihedral angle of a biaugmented triangular prism between two adjacent triangles (the base of a triangular prism and the lateral face of an equilateral square pyramid), on the edge where the equilateral square pyramid is attached to the triangular prism, is:
  $$\arctan\left(\sqrt{2}\right) + \frac{\pi}{2} \approx 144.7^\circ.$$

== Application ==
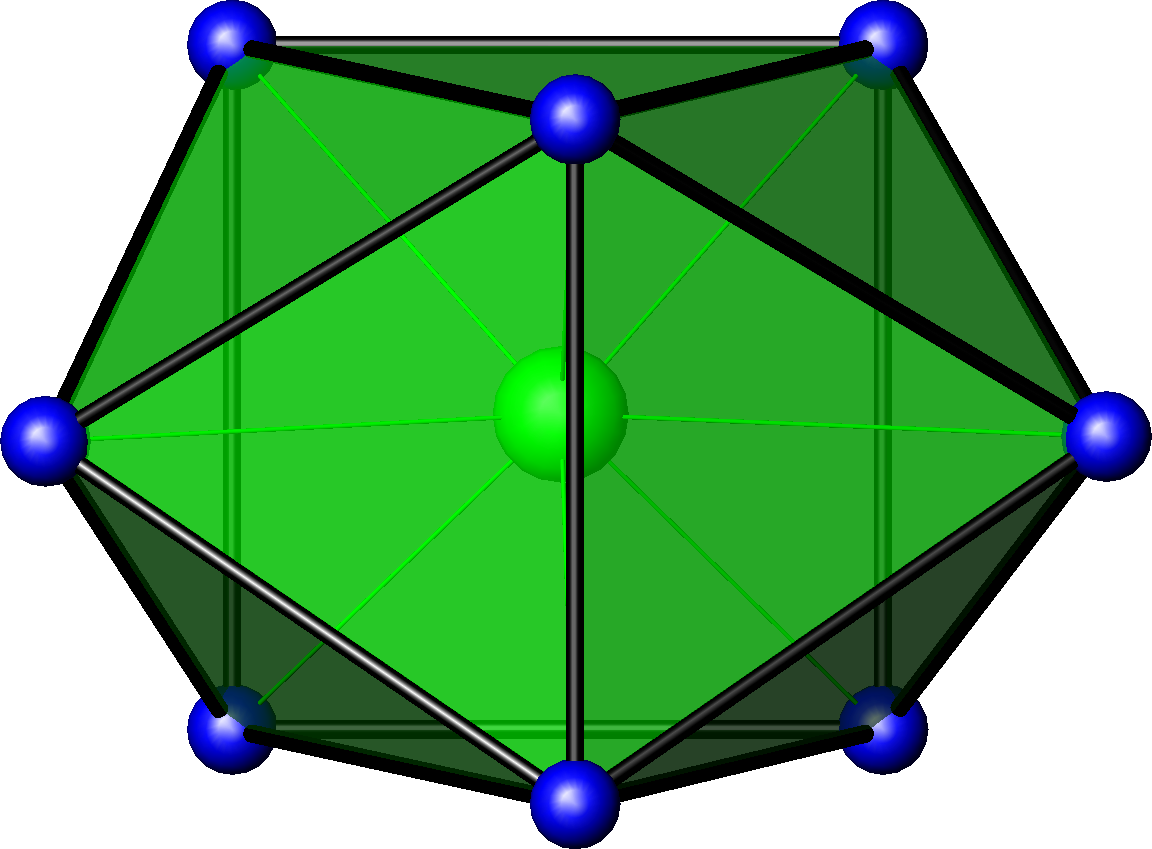
Illustration of bicapped trigonal prismatic molecular geometry, the biaugmented triangular prism plays the role of a chemical compound structure. The blue vertices are the atoms.

The biaugmented triangular prism can be found in stereochemistry. In this subfield of chemistry which studies molecule structures, the biaugmented triangular prism is a structural shape of the chemical compound known as the bicapped trigonal prismatic molecular geometry. The structure contains eight vertices representing the atoms, commonly found in transition metal other than the chemical structure of square antiprism and the snub disphenoid. Examples of the structure are plutonium tribromide PuBr_{3} adopted by bromides and iodides of the lanthanides and actinides, and the anionic octaflouride of octafluorozirconate(IV) ZrF^{4−}_{8}.
