= Bismuth compounds =

Chemical compounds with at least one bismuth atom

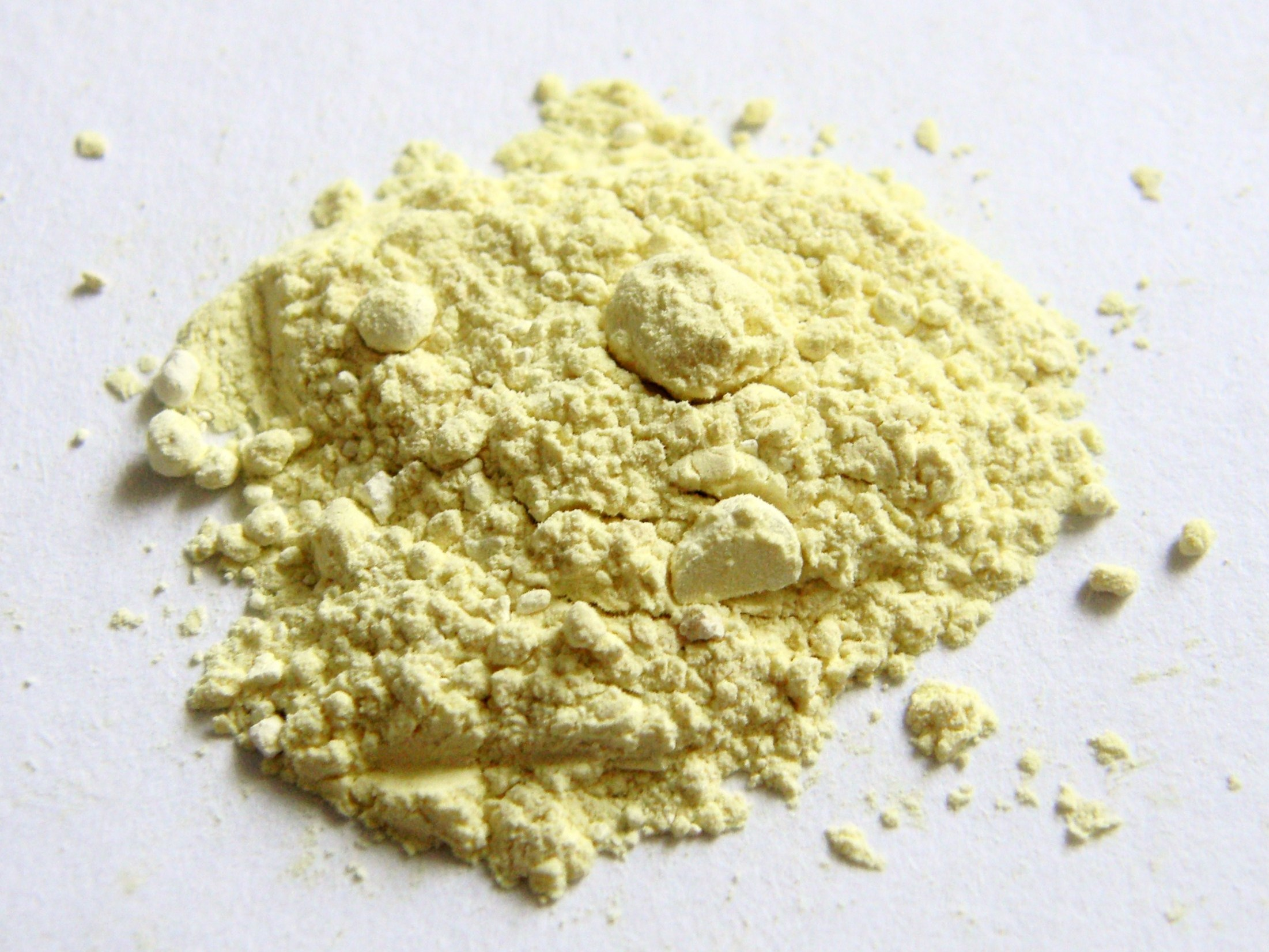
Bismuth(III) oxide powder

Bismuth forms mainly trivalent and a few pentavalent compounds. Many of its chemical properties are similar to those of arsenic and antimony, although much less toxic.

== Oxides and sulfides ==
At elevated temperatures, vaporized bismuth metal and oxygen combine into the yellow trioxide, Bi_{2}O_{3}. At temperatures above 710 °C, this (molten) oxide corrodes all known oxides and even platinum. It forms two series of oxyanions in basic conditions: linear, chain-polymeric BiO^{−}_{2}; and cubic BiO^{3−}_{3}. In Li_{3}BiO_{3}, the anion forms the octamer Bi_{8}O^{24−}_{24}; in Na_{3}BiO_{3}, the tetramer.

The dark red bismuth(V) oxide, Bi_{2}O_{5}, is unstable, liberating O_{2} gas upon heating. The compound NaBiO_{3} is a strong oxidant.

Bismuth sulfide, Bi_{2}S_{3}, occurs naturally in bismuth ores, but can be synthesized from molten bismuth and sulfur.

== Halides ==
In oxidation state +3, bismuth forms salts with all the halogens: BiF_{3}, BiCl_{3}, BiBr_{3}, and BiI_{3}. All hydrolyze in water except BiF_{3}. Bismuth(III) chloride reacts with hydrogen chloride in ether solution to produce the acid HBiCl_{4}.

The oxidation state +5 is less frequently encountered. One such compound is the powerful oxidant and fluorinator, BiF_{5}. It is also a strong fluoride acceptor, forming the XeF^{+}_{3} cation from xenon tetrafluoride:

BiF_{5} + XeF_{4} → XeF^{+}_{3}BiF^{−}_{6}

The low-oxidation-state bismuth halides adopt unusual cluster structures. What was originally thought bismuth(I) chloride, BiCl, is in fact a lattice of Bi^{5+}_{9} cations and BiCl^{2−}_{5} and Bi_{2}Cl^{2−}_{8} anions. The Bi^{5+}_{9} cation has a distorted tricapped trigonal prismatic molecular geometry and is also found in Bi_{10}Hf_{3}Cl_{18}, which is prepared by reducing a mixture of hafnium(IV) chloride and bismuth chloride with elemental bismuth, having the structure [Bi^{+}] [Bi^{5+}_{9}] [HfCl^{2−}_{6}]_{3}. Other polyatomic bismuth cations are also known, such as Bi^{2+}_{8}, found in Bi_{8}(AlCl_{4})_{2}.

There is a true monoiodide, BiI, which contains chains of Bi_{4}I_{4} units. BiI decomposes upon heating to the triiodide, BiI_{3}, and elemental bismuth.

Bismuth forms at least two "monobromides": one isostructural to "BiCl" and one isostructural to Bi_{4}I_{4}.

== Aqueous species and the bismuthyl cation ==
In aqueous solution, the Bi^{3+} ion is solvated to form the aqua ion Bi(H_{2}O)^{3+}_{8} in strongly acidic conditions. At pH > 0 polynuclear species exist, the most important of which is believed to be the octahedral complex [Bi_{6}O_{4}(OH)_{4}]^{6+}.

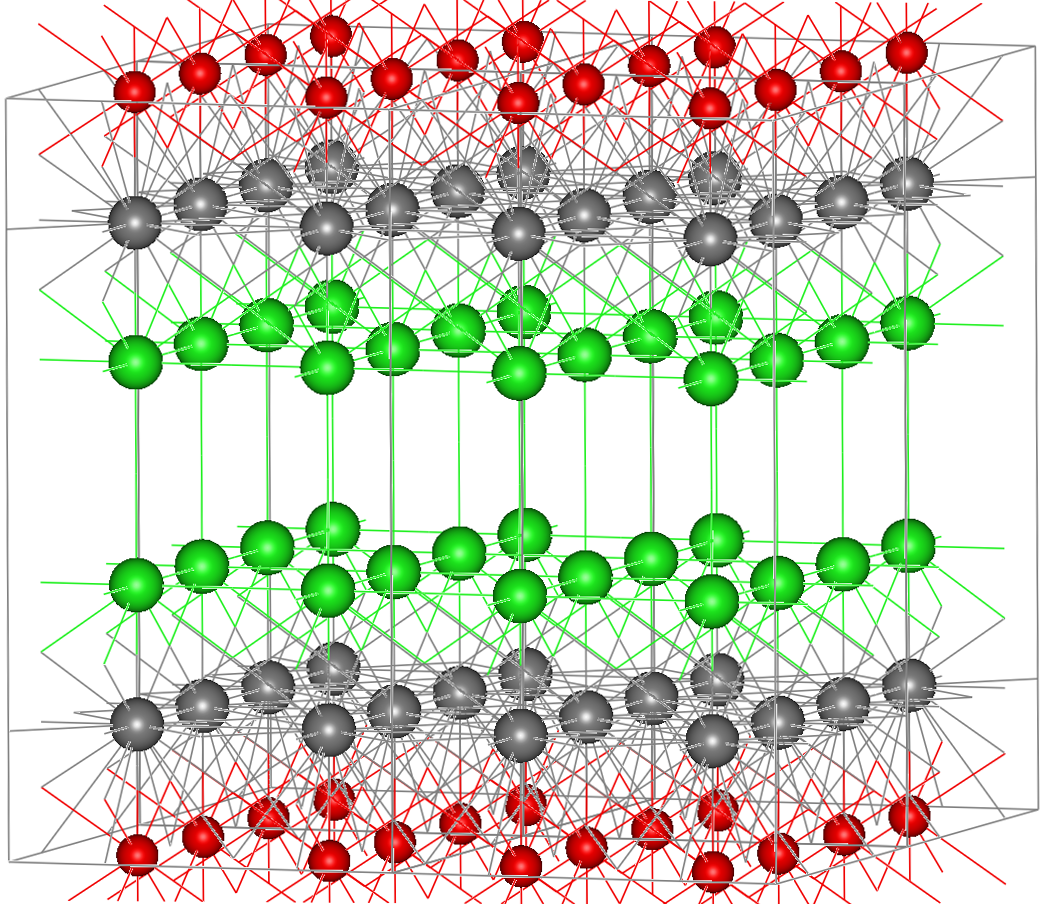
Bismuth oxychloride (BiOCl) structure (mineral bismoclite). Bismuth atoms are shown as grey, oxygen red, chlorine green.

Bismuth oxychloride (BiOCl) and bismuth oxynitrate (BiONO_{3}) stoichiometrically appear simple anionic salts of the bismuthyl(III) cation (BiO^{+}), which commonly occurs in aqueous bismuth compounds. However, in the case of BiOCl, the salt crystal forms alternating plates of Bi, O, and Cl atoms. Each oxygen coordinates with four bismuth atoms in the adjacent plane.

== Bismuthine and bismuthides ==
Unlike the lighter pnictogens nitrogen, phosphorus, and arsenic, but similar to antimony, bismuth does not form a stable hydride. Bismuth hydride, bismuthine (BiH_{3}), is an endothermic compound that spontaneously decomposes at room temperature. It is stable only below −60 °C. Bismuthides are intermetallic compounds between bismuth and other metals.

In 2014 researchers discovered that sodium bismuthide admits bulk 3D Dirac fermions. As a topological Dirac semi-metal, it is a three-dimensional counterpart to graphene with similar electron mobility and velocity. While sodium bismuthide (Na_{3}Bi) is too unstable to be used in devices without packaging, it may offer distinct efficiency and fabrication advantages over planar graphene in semiconductor and spintronics applications.

== Applications ==
=== Coloration ===
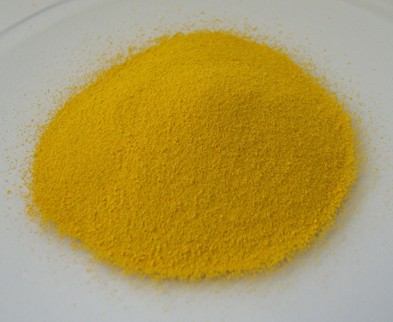
Bismuth vanadate, a yellow pigment

- Bismuth subnitrate is an iridescent component of glazes and paint pigment.
- Bismuth oxychloride is a pigment and cosmetic.
- Bismuth vanadate is an opaque yellow pigment used by some artists' oil, acrylic, and watercolor paint companies, primarily as a replacement for the more toxic cadmium sulfide yellows in the greenish-yellow (lemon) to orange-toned yellow range. It performs practically identically to the cadmium pigments in UV resistance, opacity, tinting strength, and inertness when mixed with other pigments. The most commonly used variety by artists' paint makers is lemon in color.

The vanadate also replaces older zinc, lead, and strontium chromate pigments for much the same reason. With a green pigment and barium sulfate (for increased transparency), it can also replace the greenish-tinted barium chromate. Unlike lead chromates, it does not blacken from atmospheric hydrogen sulfide and possesses a particularly brighter color. The difference is especially apparent with the lemon, which has a more concentrated lead sulfate mixture.
Vanadate paints are also used, on a limited basis due to its cost, on vehicles.

- Bismuth(III) salts (oxide, subcarbonate or subnitrate) color crackling microstar (dragon's egg) pyrotechnics yellow.

=== Electrics and electronics ===
- Bismuth strontium calcium copper oxide (BSCCO) is a superconducting compound family discovered in 1988. Its members exhibit the highest superconducting transition temperatures at standard pressure.
- δ-Bismuth oxide is a solid electrolyte for oxygen. This form is stable only at high temperature, but can be electrodeposited well below this temperature in highly alkaline solution.
- Bismuth telluride is a semiconductor and thermoelectric. Bi_{2}Te_{3} diodes are used in mobile refrigerators, CPU coolers, and as detectors in infrared spectrophotometers.
- Bismuth germanate is a scintillator in X-ray and gamma ray detectors.

=== Chemical catalysis ===
- Bismuth is used in a catalyst for making acrylic fibers.
- Bismuth metal on glassy carbon catalyzes the electrochemical reduction of CO_{2} to CO.
- Bismuth catalyzes arylboronic pinacol ester fluorination through a Bi^{III/V} cycle.

=== Other ===
- Bismuth metal is an ingredient in some lubricating greases.

== See also ==
- Lead compounds
- Bismuth subhalides
- Organobismuth chemistry
- Bismuth organometallic chemistry
