= Bismuth subhalides =

Bismuth-containing solid-state compounds pose an interest to both the physical inorganic chemists as well as condensed matter physicists due to the element's massive spin-orbit coupling, stabilization of lower oxidation states, and the inert pair effect. Additionally, the stabilization of the Bi in the +1 oxidation state gives rise to a plethora of subhalide compounds with interesting electronics and 3D structures.

== Overview of subhalide bismuth solid-state chemistry ==
=== Topological insulators and the relationship to bismuth solid-state chemistry ===
Bismuth subhalides, such as Bi_{4}Br_{4} and β-Bi_{4}I_{4}, have been recently reported as topological insulators. Topological insulators have caught attention of physical inorganic chemists as well as condensed matter physicists due to the unique physicochemical properties emerging upon transition from bulk to surface states. Exhibiting an energy band gap of classic insulator, the edge/surface states of the material acquire dissipationless electric transport. The subject has been investigated by condensed matter physicists as well as mathematicians to provide a link between the experimental emerging properties and the modeled topology. Broadly, the material's physics pertains to the Quantum Hall effect relying upon two pillars: time-reversal symmetry and spin orbit coupling, the latter dependent on the elemental material composition. Bismuth's heavy pnictogen nature yields a large spin-orbit coupling. Additionally, when bound to heavy halogens, bismuth subhalides give rise to a low-dimensional van der Waals bonded structure, exfoliatable into nanowires.

=== Structure of β-Bi_{4}I_{4} ===
Low dimensional van der Waals bonded materials display a fundamental material unit, usually depicted as the simplest molecular formula obeying stoichiometry. A series of such fundamental units align in the bulk material phase due to weak van der Waals interactions. Overall, key advantages conferred by the chemical structure are the ease to scale the materials down to nanostructures under simultaneous conservation of the bulk structure and the reduction in defects amount.

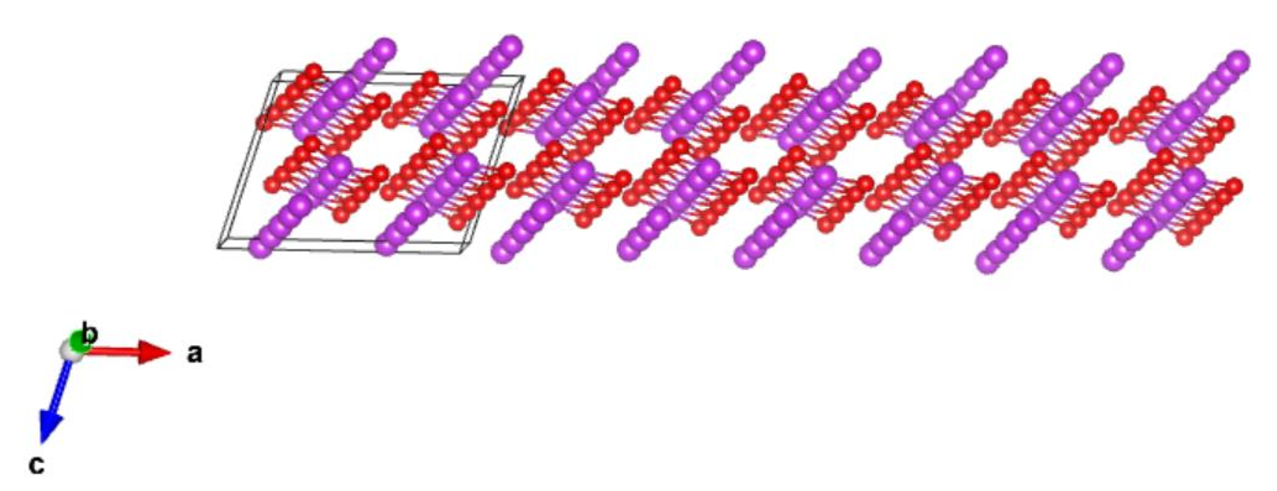
β-Bi_{4}I_{4} solid-state material structure (Bi - purple, I - red).

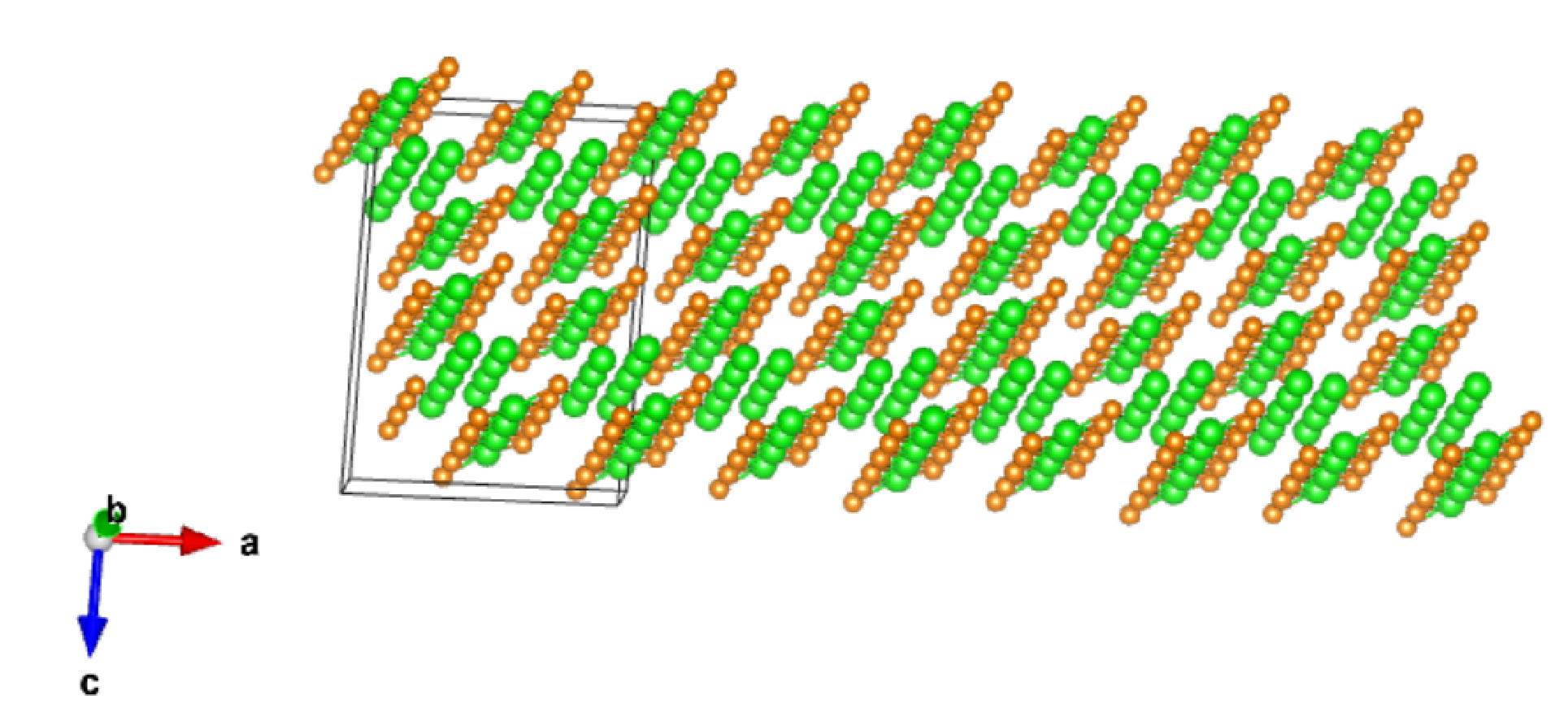
α-Bi_{4}I_{4} solid-state material structure (Bi - green, I - orange).

Belonging to the larger class of quasi 1-dimensional van der Waals bonded materials, β-Bi_{4}I_{4} has been recently reported as a novel topological insulator. The binary bismuth-iodine family class includes the known bismuth(III) iodide along with additional representatives such as α-Bi_{4}I_{4}, Bi_{14}I_{4}, Bi_{16}I_{4}, and Bi_{18}I_{4}. Having the same stoichiometric chemical formula, α-Bi_{4}I_{4} and β-Bi_{4}I_{4} show similar solid-state structures yet critically different physicochemical properties. Specifically, α-Bi_{4}I_{4} represents the trivial insulator phase, while stacking of the bismuth atoms along the b crystallographic axis in the β-Bi_{4}I_{4} phase yield a different topological insulator phase. Both isoforms crystallise in the C2/m space group, with α-Bi_{4}I_{4} having a unit cell volume almost double of its topological insulator counterpart. The β crystallographic angle is higher in the β-Bi_{4}I_{4}: 107.87 vs 92.96, making the β-Bi_{4}I_{4} more tilted (see images above).

=== Synthesis ===
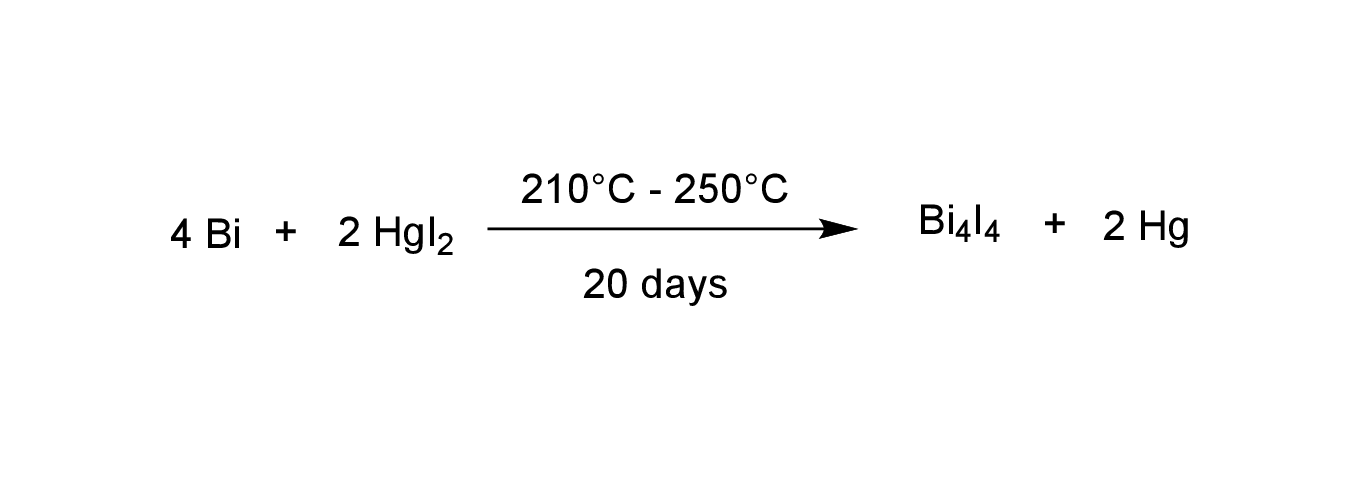
β-Bi_{4}I_{4} solid-state synthesis

Crystal growth of β-Bi_{4}I_{4} was achieved through a solid-state reaction between Bi and HgI_{2} in a ratio of 1:2. The mixture of solid-state precursors was sealed under dynamic vacuum in a quartz ampoule and subjected to a temperature gradient of 250 °C - 210 °C in a two-zone furnace for 20 days. Needle-like blue crystals were obtained with sizes varying from a couple of mm in length and tenths of mm in diameter.

=== DFT Calculations ===
Key to modeling the topology of a material are the special points along k-vector of the Brillouin zone, accounting for the accurate depiction of the density of states emerging from the electronics of the material. Density functional theory (DFT) analyses predicted an indirect band gap of 0.158 eV in the β-Bi_{4}I_{4} phase with the valence and conduction band maxima localized at the Γ and M k-space points, respectively. Interestingly enough, the major contributors to the band structure around the Fermi level are bismuth's p orbitals of even and odd parity, thus giving the gerade and ungerade points of symmetry.

=== ARPES measurements ===
The allowed electron energies in the topological insulator were probed with the well-employed angle-resolved photoemission spectroscopy (ARPES). Γ and M space points were found to exhibit binding energies of 0.3 eV and 0.8 eV, respectively. ARPES also probed the Fermi electron velocities along the x and y axes to be 0.1(1)×106 m*s^{−1} and 0.60(4)×106 m*s^{−1}. The emerging non-trivial states of the topological insulator are expected to show at the space point where the conductive and valence bands almost cross or, in other words, display the smallest band gap. This point indeed showed a binding energy of 0.06 eV as measured by ARPES. ARPES measurements on a different β-Bi_{4}Br_{4} topological insulator phase show similarity to its iodine counterpart.

=== Subhalide complexes ===
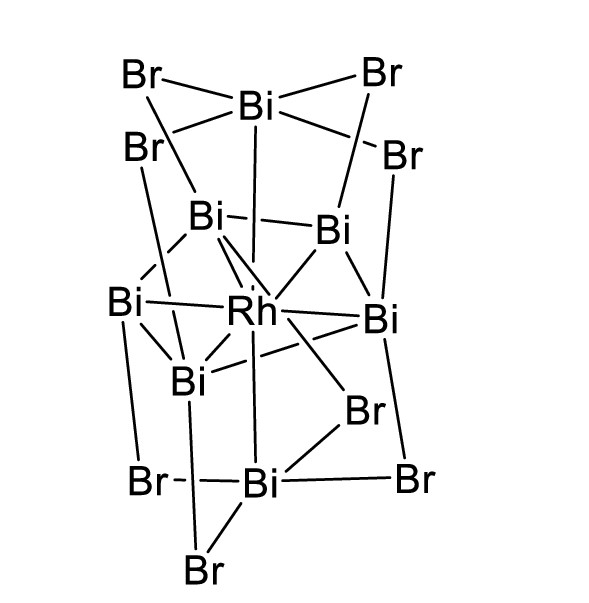
Structure of RhBi_{7}Br_{8} subhalide complex

A ternary rhodium-centered bipyramidal dibismuth complex is an example of subhalide complexes with interesting geometry and unusual electronic properties, particularly what has been reported as an example of Möbius aromaticity. The complex exhibits a 4-electron-5-centered bond in the central plane occupied by a Bi_{5} equatorial pentagon with the rhodium center in the middle. Based on the electronic analysis carried out by Ruck (2003), the bismuth bonding consists of 2-centered-2-electron bonds, namely, Bi-Rh and Bi-Br one (see structure on the right).

The electronic analysis was carried out starting with counting the available skeletal electrons. Each of the 7 bismuth atoms contribute a total of 3x7=21 electrons (3 per each atom), while Rh gives all of its 9 electrons and the 8 bridging bromide atoms yield 3 electrons each. The total skeletal electron count is thus 54. The total skeletal electron count gets distributed as follows: 2 electrons per each of the 16 2c-2e^{−} Bi-Br bond, 2 electrons per each of the 7 2c-2e^{−} Rh-Bi metallic bond, 2 rhodium lone pairs remaining on the Rh centre (total of 4e^{−}), and 4 electrons for 5c-4e^{−} bond pertaining to the central pentagon. The sum of electrons used in bonding is therefore 54. Hence, the subhalide complex is electron-precise, i.e., with all of its skeletal electrons involved in chemical bonding.

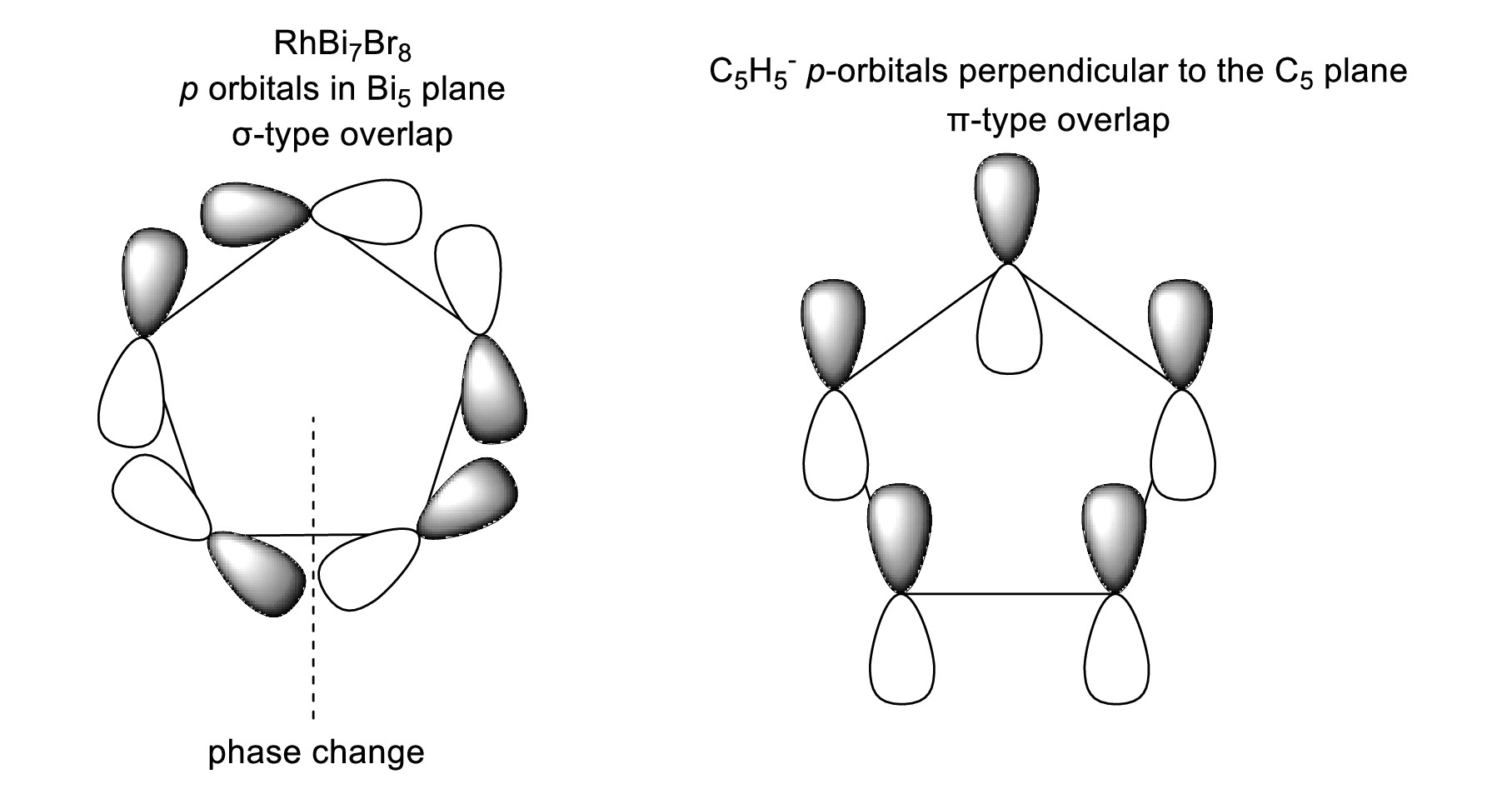
Orbital bonding in RhBi_{7}Br_{8} subhalide complex compared to C_{5}H_{5}^{−} cyclopentadienyl unit

The bonding in such a system was compared to the aromatic cyclopentadienyl aromatic anion. Contrary to the π-type all in-phase orbital overlap exhibited by the organic cyclopentadienyl anion, σ-type bonding of the RhBi_{5} unit yields a phase change for an orbital pair (see figure).

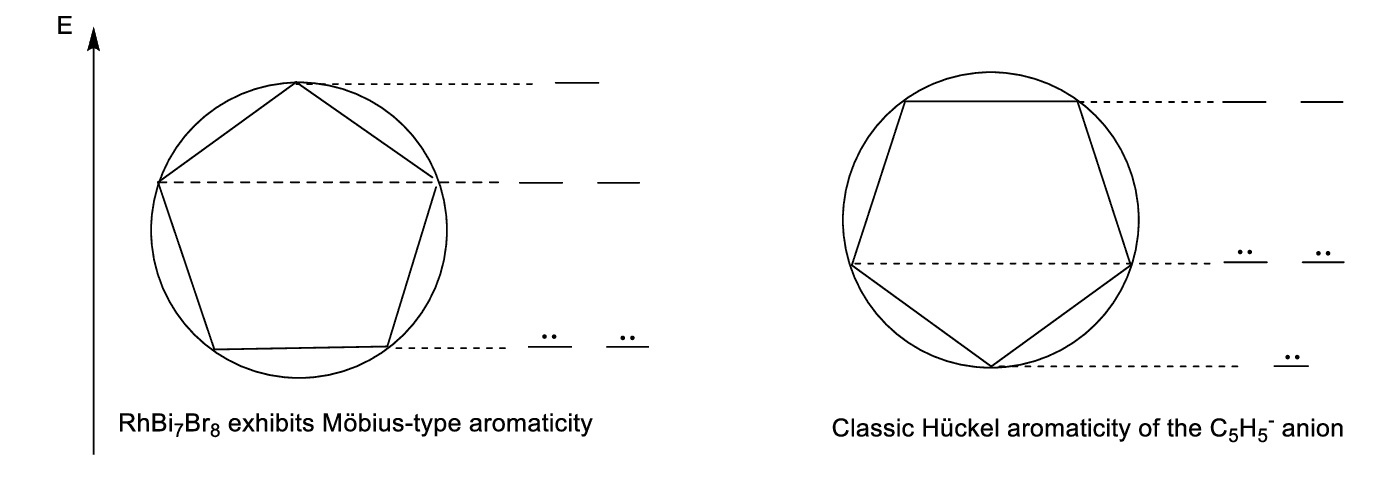
Möbius- and Hückel-type aromaticity of the Rh-Bi subhalide complex and cyclopentadienyl anion, respectively

The relative orbital energy diagram is rationalized for each of the systems relying on the Frost-Musulin mnemonic. The two lone pairs stemming from the rhodium metallic center are localized on the lowest-lying twicely degenerate set of molecular orbitals, consistent with the Möbius-type aromaticity. For reference, the electronics of the aromatic organice cyclopentadienyl unit is shown to the right of the rhodium-centered pentagonal Bi_{5} unit. As can be seen, Hückel rules dictate the molecular orbital splitting is inverted compared to its metallic counterpart, the highest-occupied molecular orbitals this time being twicely degenerate.

== See also ==
- Solid-state chemistry
- Topological insulator
- Bismuth compounds
