= J85 =

J85 may refer to:

- General Electric J85, a small single-shaft turbojet engine
- HMS Seagull (J85), a Halcyon class minesweeper of Royal Navy
- J_{85}, the Johnson solid notation for a snub square antiprism
- LNER Class J85, a class of British steam locomotives
