= Francium hydroxide =

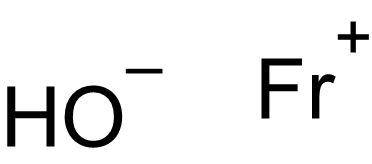

Identifiers
3D model (JSmol)	Interactive image
ChemSpider	129549180
PubChem CID	21924433
CompTox Dashboard (EPA)	DTXSID101336784
- InChI: InChI=1S/Fr.H2O/h;1H2/p-1 Key: ZQGZECBDMQUUIV-UHFFFAOYSA-M
- SMILES: [Fr+].[OH-]

Properties
Chemical formula	FrOH
Molar mass	240 g·mol^{−1}

Related compounds
Other cations	LiOH; NaOH; KOH; RbOH; CsOH; Ca(OH)_{2}
- Except where otherwise noted, data are given for materials in their standard state (at 25 °C [77 °F], 100 kPa). Infobox references

Francium hydroxide is a hypothetical inorganic compound with a chemical formula FrOH. It is a hydroxide of francium.

It probably can be produced by reacting francium metal with water:

2 Fr + 2 H_{2}O → 2 FrOH + H_{2} (gas)

This reaction might be explosive, because this reaction is probably very exothermic, because of which water could suddenly start boiling violently, producing hot water vapor, and very flammable hydrogen gas is produced in the reaction as well, and hydrogen could ignite, causing fire and explosion. However this is all guesswork, since a visible quantity of francium has never been made.

Francium hydroxide's alkalinity is predicted to be stronger than caesium hydroxide. Its pH is expected to exceed 14.
