= Bismuth organometallic chemistry =

Bismuth ligands for transition metals

The stabilization of bismuth's +3 oxidation state due to the inert pair effect yields a plethora of organometallic bismuth-transition metal compounds and clusters with interesting electronics and 3D structures.

== Structure ==
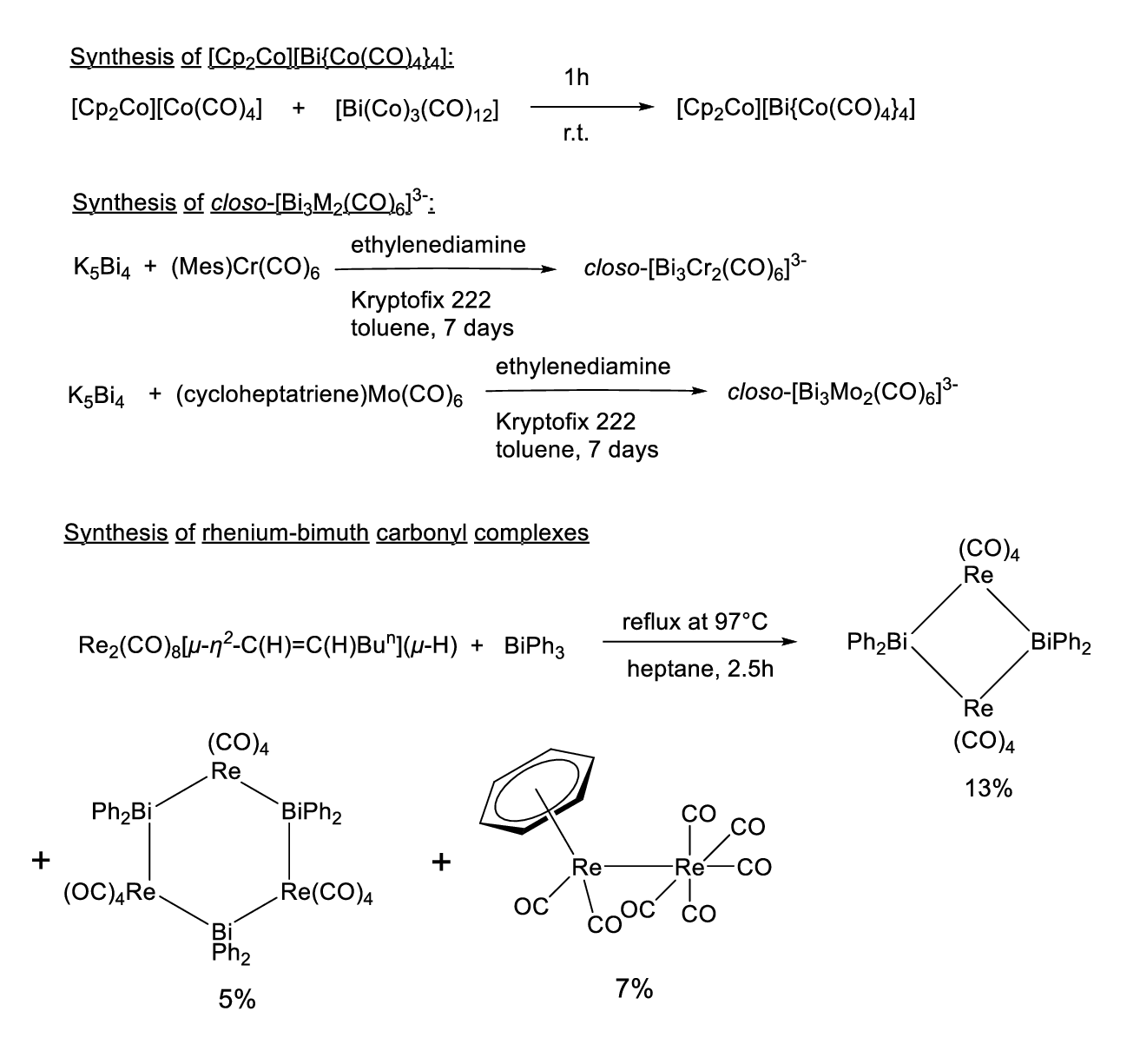
Summary of metal-bismuth carbonyl complexes syntheses

As is typical for bismuth compounds, the 6s electron pair is mainly inert. Organometallic Bi(III) compounds are Lewis acids, similar to group 13 element organometallic chemistry.

Also similar to boron compounds, bismuth forms a wide variety of metal clusters. Most synthetic routes use bismuth trichloride as the bismuth metal source.

Below, compounds are sorted roughly by increasing electron delocalization.

=== Classical σ bonding ===
In the simplest case, Bi forms a simple σ bond to another metal. For example, cyclopentadienyldicarbonyliron (Fp) is isolobally a pseudohalide:

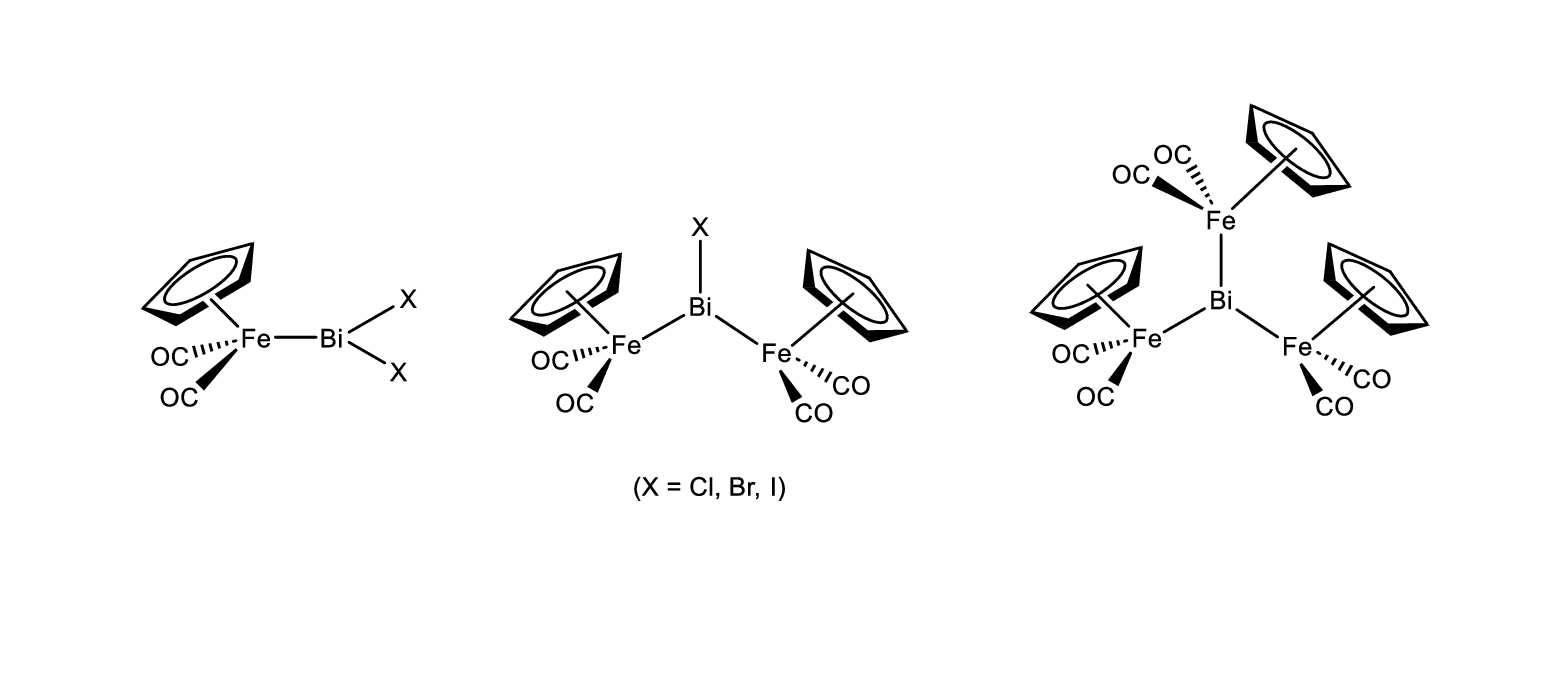
Mono-, bi-, and trimetallated bismuth-iron cyclopentadienyl complexes

With cobalt tetracarbonyl instead of Fp, there exist similar compounds, which are Lewis acids. The formal adduct with cobaltocenium tetracarbonylcobalt is the tetrahedral, paramagnetic [Cp_{2}Co][Bi{Co(CO)_{4}}_{4}] complex.

An analogous manganese compound forms a delocalized Mn-Bi-Mn bond:

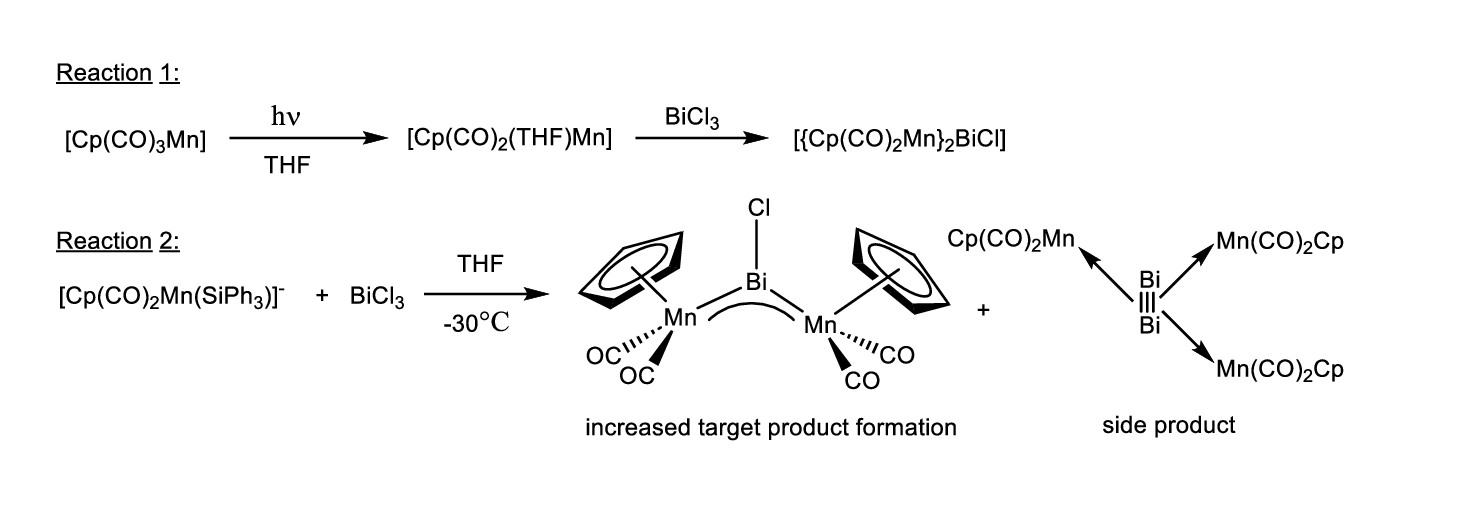
Syntheses of bismuth-manganese organometallic complexes employs bismuth trichloride salt as the bismuth-containing starting material

=== Polybismuth ligands ===
Other clusters contain a formal dibismuthene or dibismithyne unit, coordinated through the Dewar–Chatt–Duncanson interaction. For example, oligo-trimethylsilylbismuth(I) reacts with pentacarbonyltungsten tetrahydrofuran to give a cluster with a Bi-Bi bond length corresponding to a single bond:

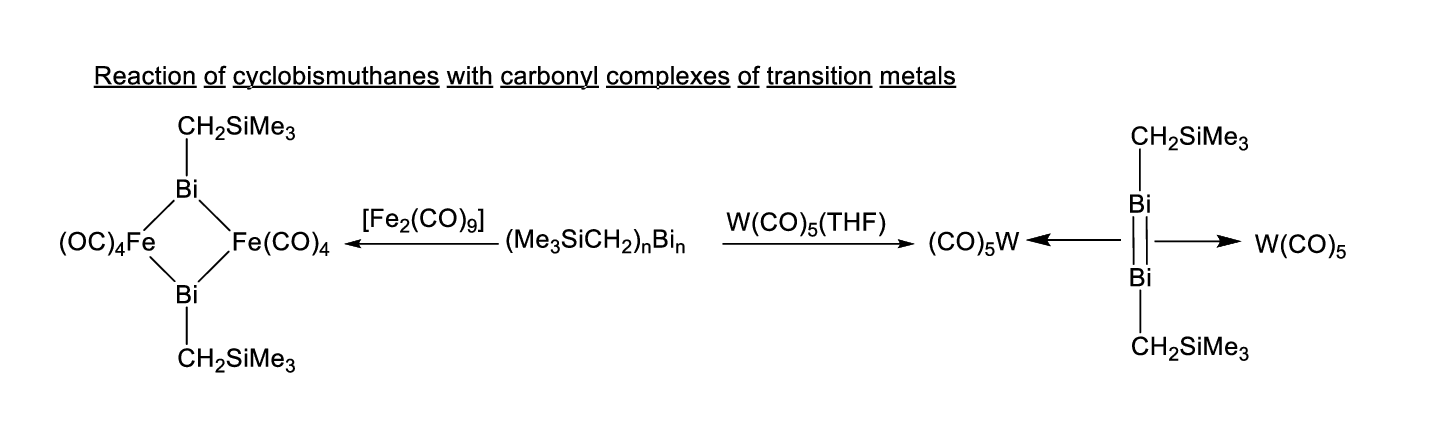
Cyclobismuthane reaction with metal carbonyl complexes

Another example comes in the form of a zirconocene unit, side-coordinated to a dibismuth mesitylene moiety (pictured below).

In 2009, Pearl et al. described the synthesis and isomerization of heterometallic complexes containing bismuth and rhenium. The precursors used in synthesis were an alkene-coordinated carbonyl rhenium complex and BiPh_{3}. The reaction yields two types of heteronuclear bismuth-rhenium complexes and a homodinuclear rhenium one as a side product. Upon heating, the hexametallic tribismuth-trirhenium heteronuclear complex undergoes isomerization to cis- and trans-clusters containing the bicyclo [3.3.0] core. Under subsequent irradiation both stereoisomers convert to a common spiro [4.3] cluster compound:

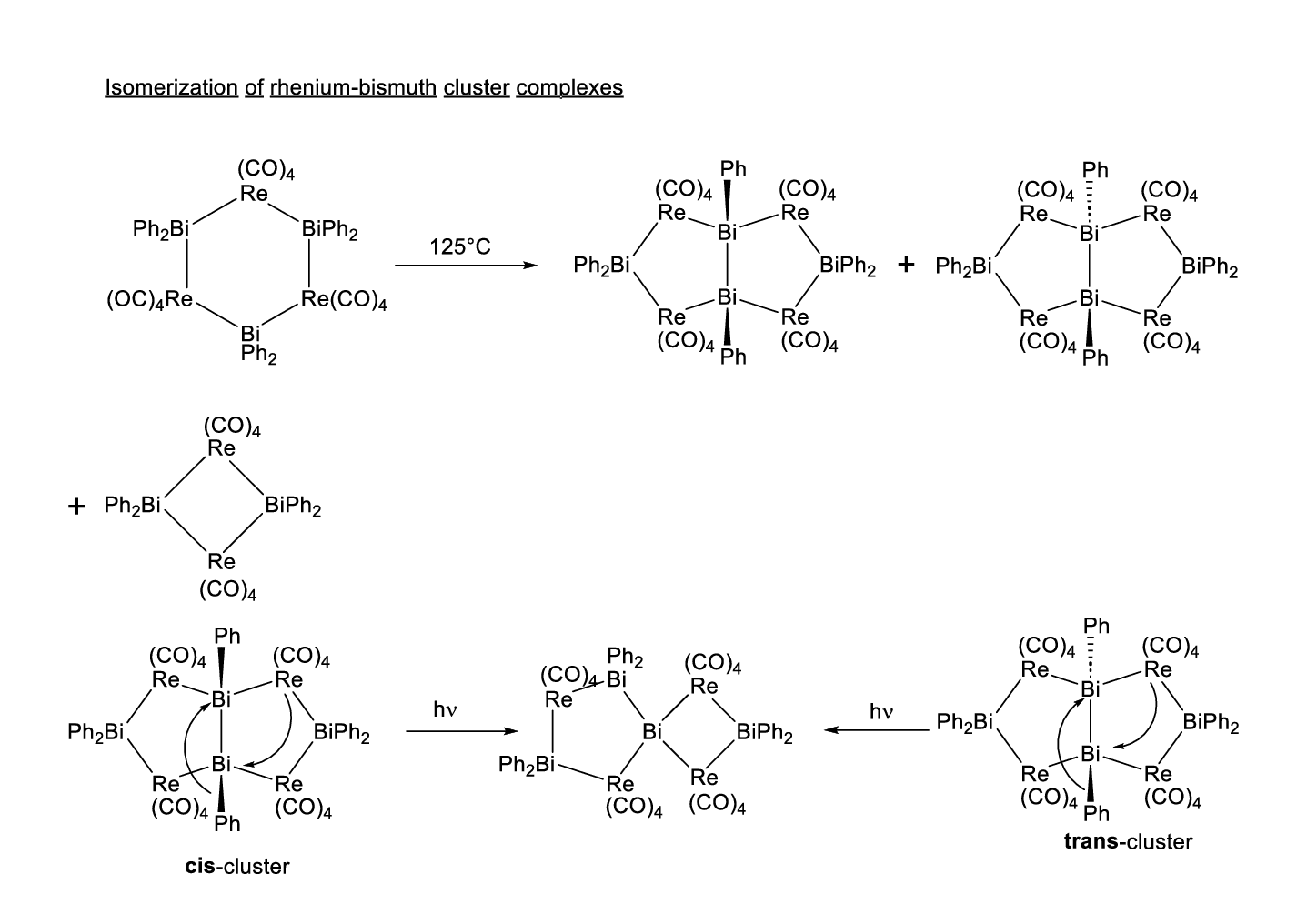
Isomerization of bismuth-rhenium cluster carbonyl compounds

Clusters like closo-[Bi_{3}Cr_{2}(CO)_{6}]^{3-} and [Bi_{3}Mo_{2}(CO)_{6}]^{3-} have been reported to stabilize the ozone-like structure of [Bi_{3}]^{3-}. The [Bi_{3}]^{3-} species, isostructural and isoelectronic with ozone, can be analyzed independently as a moiety bound to the metal carbonyl complexes. The reported Bi-Bi distance falls in between the single and double bond region and is elongated compared to Bi=Bi bond in the [Bi_{4}]^{2-} cluster, the later displaying a bond order of 1.25. This experimental observation is being rationalized by some amount of π-donation to the metal carbonyl center and simultaneously π* back-bonding to the bismuth cluster from the metallocene complex.

=== PSEPT-type clusters ===
Bismuth atoms may appear at a wide variety of positions in a polyhedral skeleton:

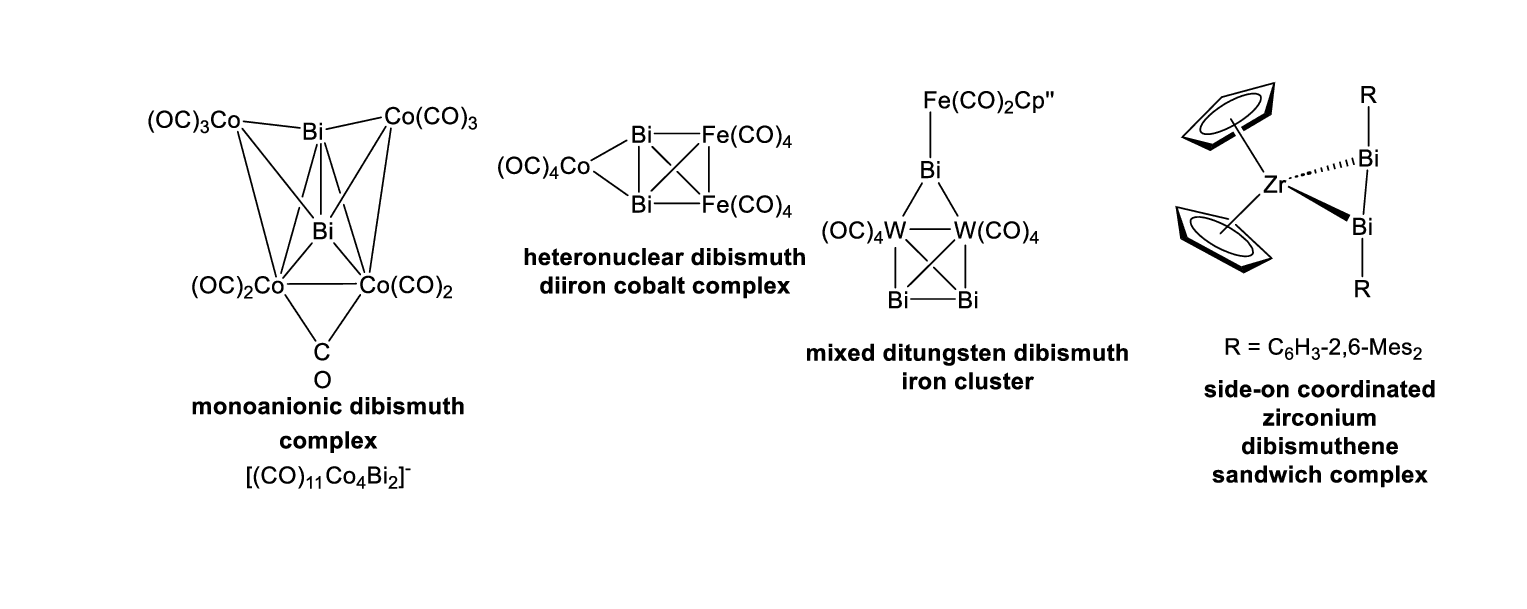
Examples of dibismuthene complexes

Strained cluster complexes with monodentate as well as bridging carbon monoxide units have also been isolated, such as [{Cp(μ_{2}-CO)Fe}_{3}(μ_{3}-Bi)] and [(μ_{3}-Bi)Co_{3}(CO)_{6}(μ-CO)_{3}]:

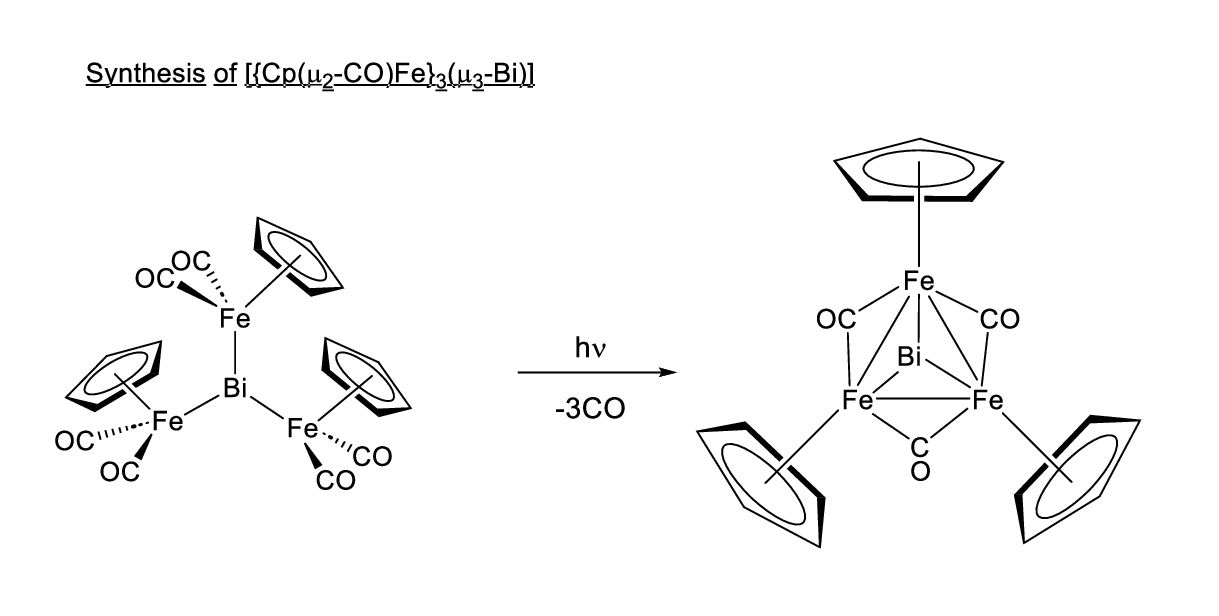
Synthesis of [{Cp(μ_{2}-CO)Fe}_{3}(μ_{3}-Bi)]

Spiro-like clusters such as [{Ru_{2}(CO)_{8}}(μ_{4}-Bi){(μ-H)Ru_{3}(CO)_{10}} and cubane-like ones as [Bi_{4}Co*_{4}] are representatives as well. The former displays a tetracoordinate bismuth metallic center along with a dicoordinated hydride ligand. The structure of the latter is cubic with the edges alternating bismuth and cobalt metallic centers:

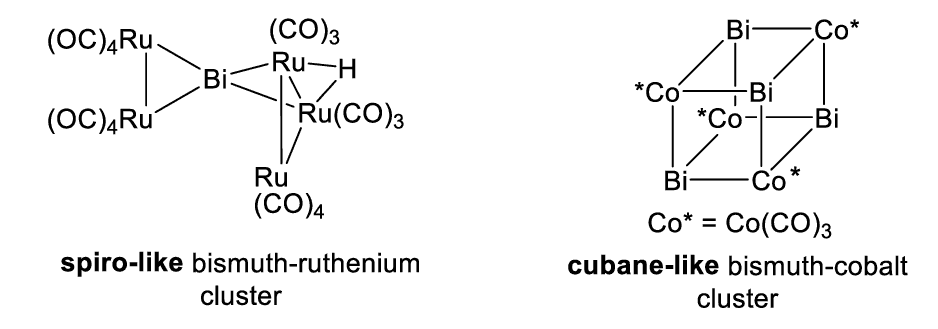
Spiro-like and cubane-like bismuth clusters

== Applications ==
Organobismuth compounds have been proposed as non-toxic nucleophile partners in Suzuki-Miyaura-type coupling reactions. Transmetallation to organopalladium compounds occurs by two different mechanisms:

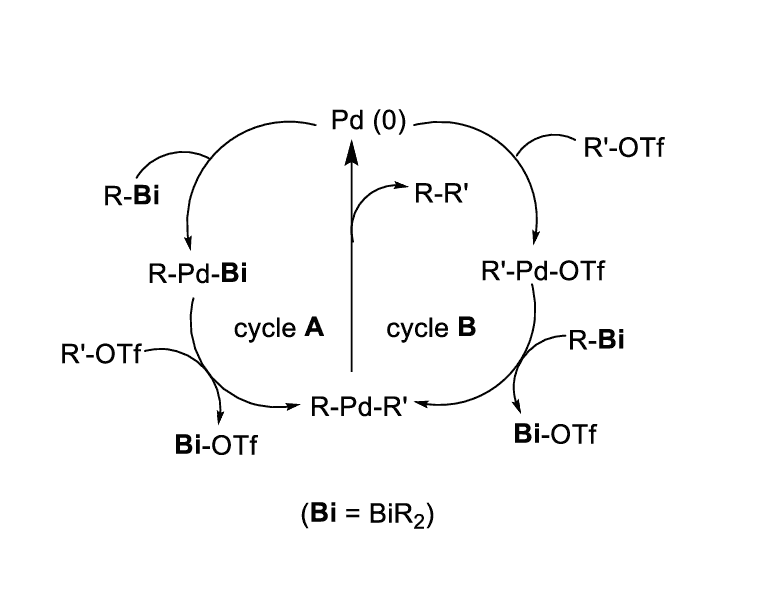
Carbon-carbon bond formation catalyzed by bismuth organometallic compounds can proceed through two different mechanisms depending on the rate of the oxidative addition to Pd(0)

In cycle A, Pd(0) oxidative addition occurs faster with the nucleophile's C-Bi bond; in cycle B, it occurs faster with the electrophile's C-O one.

== "Paddlewheel" complexes ==
Inspired from the dirhodium tetraacetate bimetallic salt, synthetic chemists decided to explore the synthesis of paddlewheel mixed heteronuclear bismuth-rhodium salts. The synthesis involves treatment of the [Rh_{2}(O_{2}CR)_{4}] salt with the dibismuth tetrafluoroacetate [Bi_{2}(O_{2}CCF_{3})_{4}] equivalent. Depending on the nature and sterics of the R ligand, the resulting mixed salt has either two ^{t}Bu R-substituents resulting in the cis mixed salt or a single Me R-substituent provenient from the dirhodium precursor:

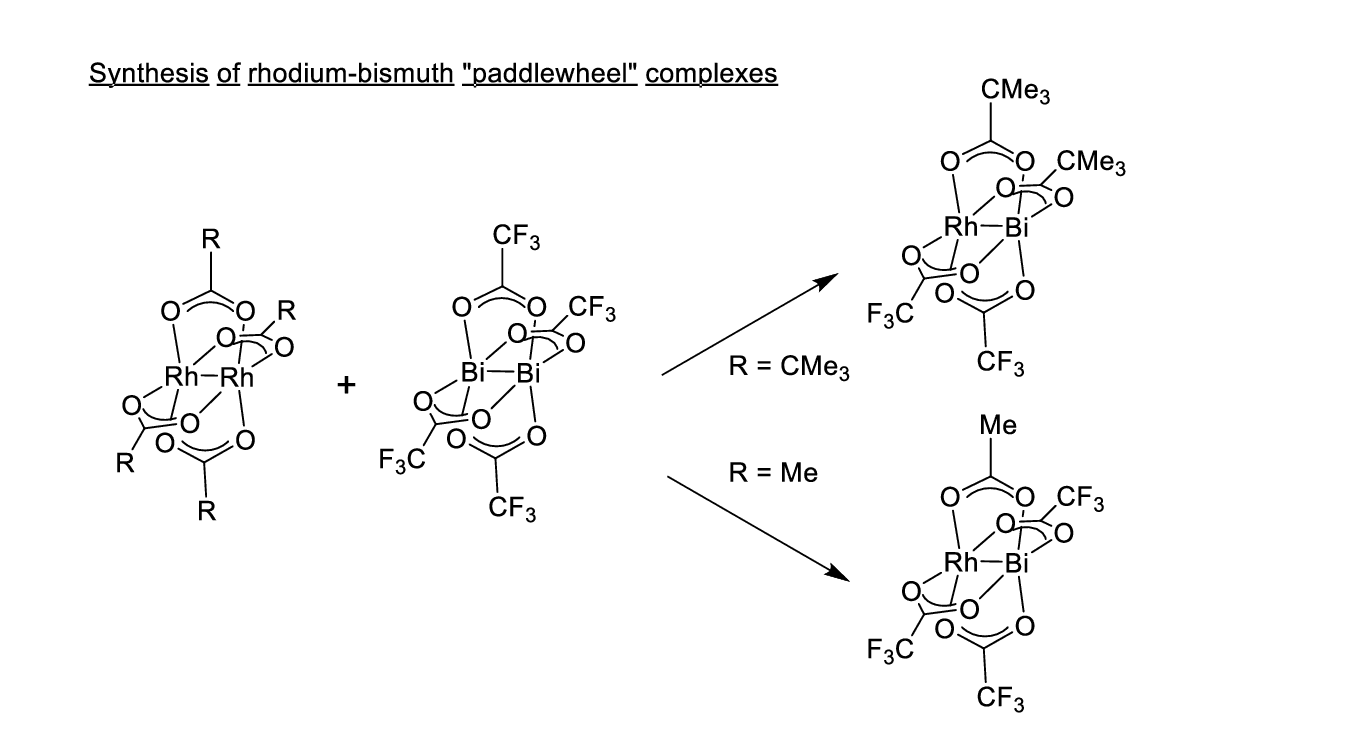
Synthesis of bismuth "paddlewheel" complexes

The mixed salts display increased air and moisture sensitivity compared to the parental dimetallic salts and show Lewis acidity at the rhodium center.

== See also ==
- Organobismuth chemistry
- Bismuth compounds
