= Hypothetical chemical compound =

Chemical compound whose existence is predicted, but not confirmed

A hypothetical chemical compound is a chemical compound that has been conceived of, but is not known to have been synthesized, observed, or isolated (identified or shown to exist).

Some hypothetical compounds cannot form at all, due to steric effects (e.g. tetra-tert-butylmethane, C(C(CH_{3})_{3})_{4}, chlorine heptafluoride, ClF_{7}, or bromine heptafluoride, BrF_{7}) or bond stress (e.g. tetrahedrane C_{4}H_{4}). Others might turn out to be highly unstable, decomposing, isomerizing, polymerizing, rearranging, or disproportionating. Some are thought to exist only briefly as reactive intermediates or in vacuum. Some have no known pathway for synthesis (e.g. hypercubane).

Some compounds of radioactive elements have never been synthesized due to their radioactive decay and short half-lives (e.g. francium hydroxide FrOH, radon hexafluoride RnF_{6}, astatine heptafluoride AtF_{7}, polonium(II) fluoride PoF_{2}).

Some "parent compounds" have not been or cannot be isolated, even though stable structural analogs with substituents have been discovered or synthesized (e.g. borole C_{4}H_{4}BH). Hypothetical compounds are often predicted or expected from known compounds, such as a families of salts for which the "parent acid" is not a stable molecule, or in which salts form with some cations but not others. Examples of such "phantom acids" are disulfurous acid HO−S(=O)−S(=O)_{2}−OH and sulfurous acid O=S(−OH)_{2}, whose salts are stable.

Hypothetical compounds are used in some thought experiments.

Some compounds long regarded as hypothetical have later been reported to be isolated. Potassium trichromate has been produced in a small scale and is known to be a very powerful oxidizing agent. Sodium trichromate and sodium and potassium tetrachromate have been hypothesized but are yet to be synthesized.. Generation of pentazole N_{5}H (all nitrogen analog of azole) was first reported in 2003.

Other compounds were once thought to have already been produced, but are now regarded as hypothetical chemical compounds unlikely to ever be produced, such as polywater, oxygen tetrafluoride OF_{4}, chromium hexafluoride CrF_{6} and osmium octafluoride OsF_{8}. Ethylene dione was suggested in 1913 and reported to be observed spectroscopically in 2015. However, the reported spectrum was later found to match that of the oxyallyl diradical, (H_{2}C^{•})_{2}CO, formed by rearrangement or disproportionation under the high-energy experimental conditions rather than simple electron loss.

For some compounds, evidences for identification are still sporadic or not strong enough. cyclotrioxidane O_{3} has not been made in bulk, but there is evidence that tiny quantities of cyclic ozone exist at the surface of magnesium oxide crystals in air.

Other examples of hypothetical compounds are xenon octafluoride XeF_{8}, hexazine N_{6} (all nitrogen analog of benzene), octaazacubane N_{8} (all nitrogen analog of cubane), nitrogen pentafluoride NF_{5}, tetrafluoroammonium fluoride [NF_{4}]^{+}F^{−}.

Despite the fact that rhenium heptahydride ReH_{7} has not been isolated, its salt potassium nonahydridorhenate(VII) (K^{+})_{2}[ReH_{9}]^{2−} is stable.

== Prediction ==
Stability and other properties can be predicted using energy calculations and computational chemistry.

"[Using] the Born–Haber cycle to estimate ... the heat of formation ... can be used to determine whether a hypothetical compound is stable." However, "a negative formation enthalpy does not automatically imply the existence of a hypothetical compound." The method predicts that NaCl is stable but NeCl is not. It predicted XePtF_{6} based on the stability of O_{2}PtF_{6}.
