= Osmium octafluoride =

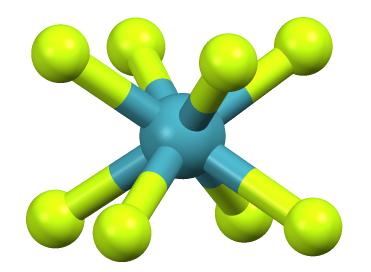
- Approximate geometry predicted computationally

Names
- IUPAC name Octafluoroosmium
- Other names Osmium(VIII) fluoride

Identifiers
CAS Number	18432-81-0
3D model (JSmol)	Interactive image
PubChem CID	57496620
- InChI: InChI=1S/8FH.Os/h8*1H;/q;;;;;;;;+8/p-8 Key: ZTSGTWBSMBQRNE-UHFFFAOYSA-F
- SMILES: F[Os](F)(F)(F)(F)(F)(F)F

Properties
Chemical formula	OsF_{8}
Molar mass	342.22 g·mol^{−1}

Structure
Crystal structure	C2/c (4 GPa); R3̅ (240 GPa)

Related compounds
Related compounds	Xenon octafluoride
- Except where otherwise noted, data are given for materials in their standard state (at 25 °C [77 °F], 100 kPa). Infobox references

Osmium octafluoride is an inorganic chemical compound of osmium metal and fluorine with the chemical formula OsF_{8}. Some sources consider it to be a still hypothetical compound. An early report of the synthesis of OsF_{8} was much later shown to be a mistaken identification of OsF_{6}. Theoretical analysis indicates OsF_{8} would have an approximately square antiprismatic molecular geometry.

== Potential synthesis ==
Osmium octafluoride has been reported to have been synthesized through the reaction of osmium metal with fluorine gas:

Os + 4 F_{2} → OsF_{8}

It is assumed that the Os-F bond is primarily ionic in nature.
