= Xenon octafluoride =

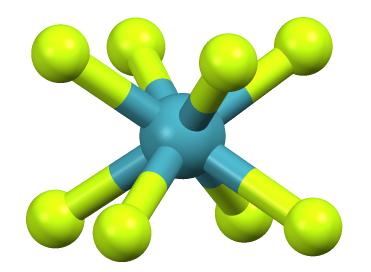
- Approximate geometry predicted computationally

Names
- IUPAC name Octafluoroxenon
- Other names Xenon(VIII) fluoride

Identifiers
CAS Number	17457-75-9
3D model (JSmol)	Interactive image
- InChI: InChI=1S/F8Xe/c1-9(2,3,4,5,6,7)8 Key: CDIGVRPYRMDMBF-UHFFFAOYSA-N
- SMILES: F[Xe](F)(F)(F)(F)(F)(F)F

Properties
Chemical formula	XeF_{8}
Molar mass	283.280 g·mol^{−1}

Related compounds
Related compounds	Osmium octafluoride
- Except where otherwise noted, data are given for materials in their standard state (at 25 °C [77 °F], 100 kPa). Infobox references

Xenon octafluoride is a chemical compound of xenon and fluorine with the chemical formula XeF_{8}. This is still a hypothetical compound. XeF_{8} is predicted to be unstable even under pressures reaching 200 GPa.

== History ==
The compound was initially predicted in 1963 by Linus Pauling—among other noble gas compounds but which, unlike other xenon fluorides, could probably never be synthesized. This appears to be due to the steric hindrance of the fluorine atoms around the xenon atom. However, scientists continue to try to synthesize it.

== Potential synthesis ==
The formation of xenon octafluoride has been calculated to be endothermic:

Xe + 4 F_{2} → XeF_{8}

== Ion ==
The doubly charged anion octafluoroxenate XeF^{2−}_{8} in which the oxidation number of xenon is only VI, is stable in salts.
