= Bicapped trigonal prismatic molecular geometry =

Shape in molecular geometry

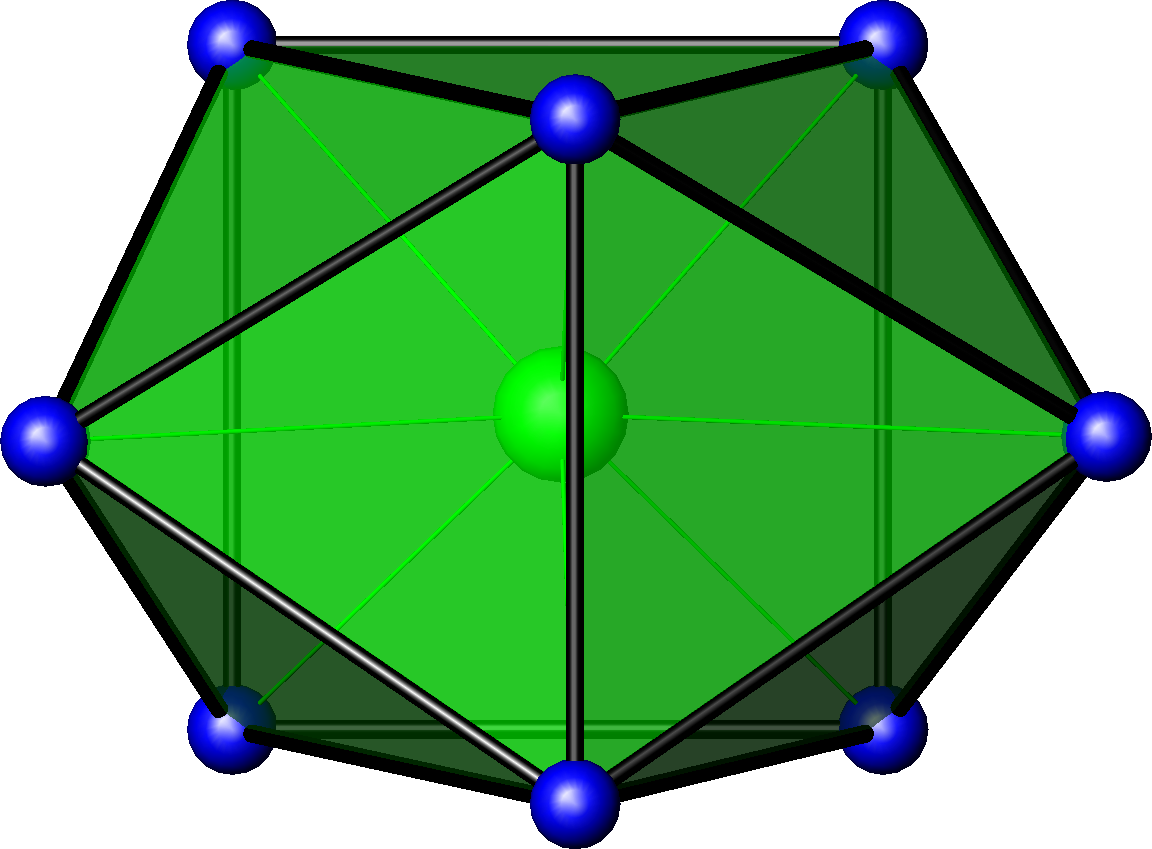
- Examples: ZrF^{4−}_{8}
- Point group: C_{2v}
- Coordination number: 8

In chemistry, the bicapped trigonal prismatic molecular geometry describes the shape of compounds where eight atoms or groups of atoms or ligands are arranged around a central atom defining the vertices of a biaugmented triangular prism. This shape has C_{2v} symmetry and is one of the three common shapes for octacoordinate transition metal complexes, along with the square antiprism and the dodecahedron.

It is very similar to the square antiprismatic molecular geometry, and there is some dispute over the specific geometry exhibited by certain molecules. One example of the bicapped trigonal prismatic molecular geometry is the ZrF^{4−}_{8} ion.

The bicapped trigonal prismatic coordination geometry is found in the plutonium(III) bromide crystal structure type, which is adopted by many of the bromides and iodides of the lanthanides and actinides.
