= Bismuth polycations =

Polyatomic ion

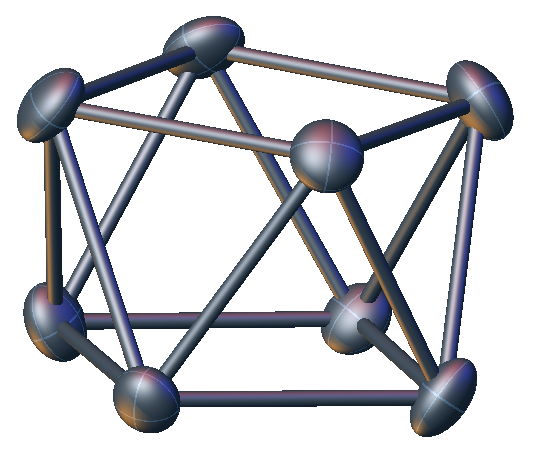
Structure of the Bi^{2+}_{8} cluster in [Bi_{8}](GaCl_{4})_{2}. The Bi–Bi bond lengths are 3.07 Å.

Bismuth polycations are polyatomic ions of the formula Bi^{n+}_{x}. They were originally observed in solutions of bismuth metal in molten bismuth chloride. It has since been found that these clusters are present in the solid state, particularly in salts where germanium tetrachloride or tetrachloroaluminate serve as the counteranions, but also in amorphous phases such as glasses and gels. Bismuth endows materials with a variety of interesting optical properties that can be tuned by changing the supporting material. Commonly-reported structures include the trigonal bipyramidal Bi^{3+}_{5} cluster, the octahedral Bi^{2+}_{6} cluster, the square antiprismatic Bi^{2+}_{8} cluster, and the tricapped trigonal prismatic Bi^{5+}_{9} cluster.

== Known materials ==
=== Crystalline ===
- Bi_{5}(AlCl_{4})_{3}
- Bi_{8}(AlCl_{4})_{2}
- Bi_{8}(AlBr_{4})_{2}
- Bi_{5}(GaCl_{4})_{3}
- Bi_{8}(GaCl_{4})_{2}

=== Metal complexes ===
- [CuBi_{8}][AlCl_{4}]_{3}
- [Ru(Bi_{8})_{2}]^{6+}
- [Ru_{2}Bi_{14}Br_{4}][AlCl_{4}]_{4}

== Structure and bonding ==
Bismuth polycations form despite the fact that they possess fewer total valence electrons than would seem necessary for the number of sigma bonds. The shapes of these clusters are generally dictated by Wade's rules, which are based on the treatment of the electronic structure as delocalized molecular orbitals. The bonding can also be described with three-center two-electron bonds in some cases, such as the Bi^{3+}_{5} cluster. Bismuth clusters have been observed to act as ligands for copper and ruthenium ions. This behavior is possible due to the otherwise fairly inert lone pairs on each of the bismuth that arise primarily from the s-orbitals left out of Bi–Bi bonding.

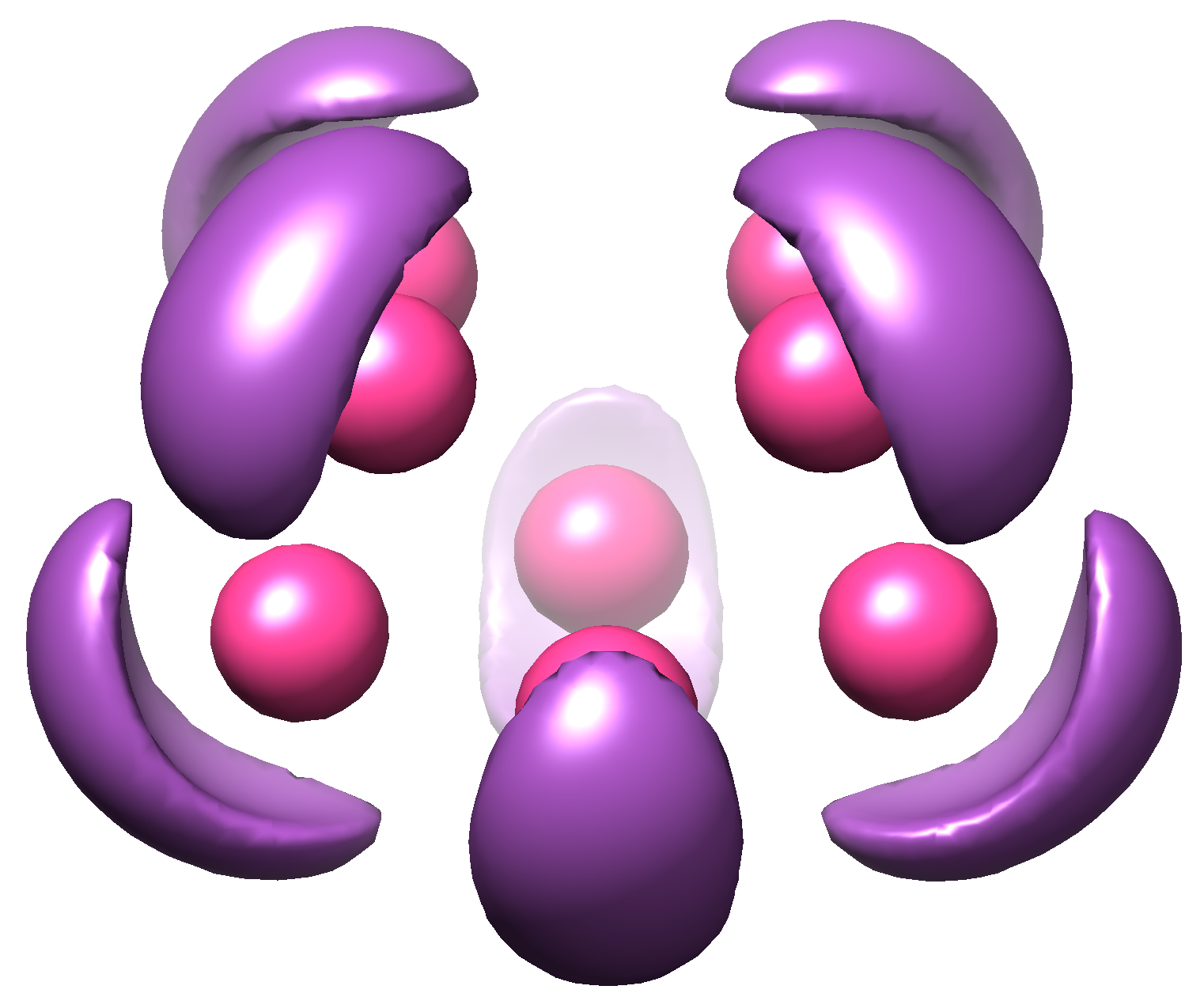
The 0.60 isosurface of the ELF of a Bi^{2+}_{8} cluster. Localizations around the nuclei are pink and lone pairs are purple.

== Optical properties ==
The variety of electron-deficient sigma aromatic clusters formed by bismuth gives rise to a wide range of spectroscopic behaviors. Of particular interest are the systems capable of low-energy electronic transitions, as these have demonstrated potential as near-infrared light emitters. It is the tendency of electron-deficient bismuth to form sigma-delocalized clusters with small HOMO/LUMO gaps that gives rise to the near-infrared emissions. This property makes these species potentially valuable to the field of near-infrared optical tomography, which exploits the near-infrared window in biological tissue.
