= Topology (disambiguation) =

Topology is a branch of mathematics concerned with geometric properties preserved under continuous deformation (stretching without tearing or gluing).

Topology may also refer to:

== Mathematics ==
- A topology is the collection of open sets used to define a topological space
- Topology can also refer to the branch of mathematics studying these topological spaces.

== Electronics ==
- Topology (electronics), a configuration of electronic components

== Computing ==
- Network topology, configurations of computer networks
  - Logical topology, the arrangement of devices on a computer network and how they communicate with one another

== Geospatial data ==
- Geospatial topology, the study or science of places with applications in earth science, geography, human geography, and geomorphology
  - In geographic information systems and their data structures, topology and planar enforcement are the storing of a border line between two neighboring areas (and the border point between two connecting lines) only once. Thus, any rounding errors might move the border, but will not lead to gaps or overlaps between the areas.
  - Also in cartography, a topological map is a greatly simplified map that preserves the mathematical topology while sacrificing scale and shape
  - Topology is often confused with the geographic meaning of topography (originally the study of places). The confusion may be a factor in topographies having become confused with terrain or relief, such that they are essentially synonymous.

== Biology ==
- The specific orientation of transmembrane proteins
- In phylogenetics, the branching pattern of a phylogenetic tree

== Music ==
- Topology (musical ensemble), an Australian post-classical quintet
- Topology (album), 1981 album by Joe McPhee

== Other ==
- Topology (journal), a mathematical journal, with an emphasis on subject areas related to topology and geometry
- Spatial effects that cannot be described by topography, i.e., social, economical, spatial, or phenomenological interactions
