= Dodecahedral molecular geometry =

8-coordinate molecular geometry

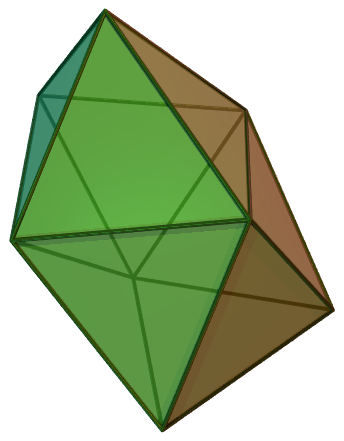
- Examples: Mo(CN)^{4−}_{8}
- Point group: D_{2d}
- Coordination number: 8
- μ (Polarity): 0

In chemistry, the dodecahedral molecular geometry describes the shape of compounds where eight atoms or groups of atoms or ligands are arranged around a central atom defining the vertices of a snub disphenoid (also known as a trigonal dodecahedron). This shape has D_{2d} symmetry and is one of the three common shapes for octacoordinate transition metal complexes, along with the square antiprism and the bicapped trigonal prism.

One example of the dodecahedral molecular geometry is the Mo(CN)^{4−}_{8} ion.
