= Nitrosonium octafluoroxenate(VI) =

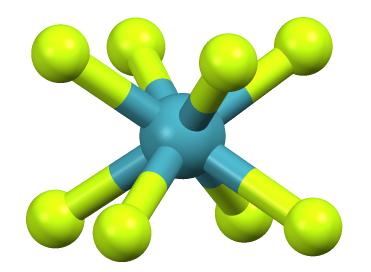
- The square antiprismatic [XeF_{8}]^{2−} anion in (NO)_{2}XeF_{8}

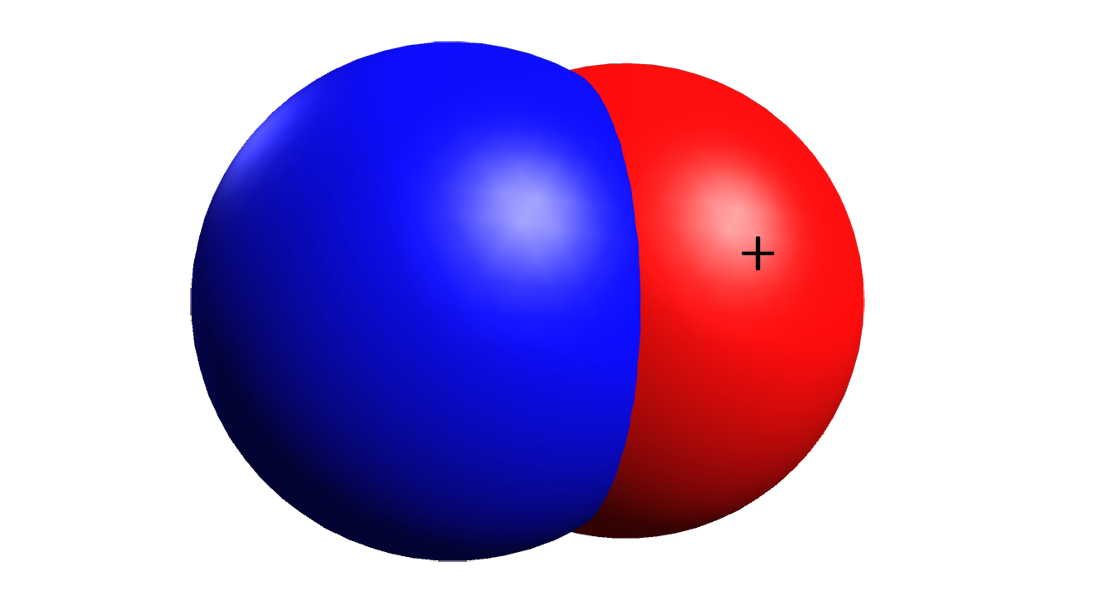

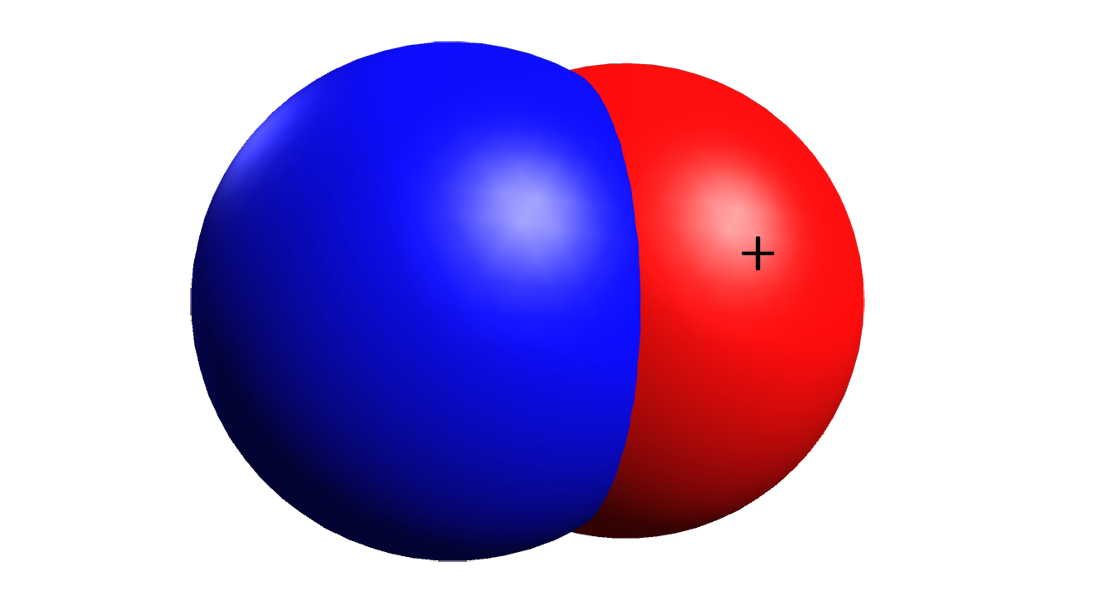

Names
- IUPAC name Nitrosonium octafluoroxenate(VI)

Identifiers
3D model (JSmol)	Interactive image
- InChI: InChI=1S/F8Xe.2NO/c1-9(2,3,4,5,6,7)8;2*1-2/q-2;2*+1 Key: UZLZIYXSQHCOGO-UHFFFAOYSA-N
- SMILES: [N]#[O+].[N]#[O+].F[Xe-2](F)(F)(F)(F)(F)(F)[F]

Properties
Chemical formula	(NO)_{2}XeF_{8}
Density	3.354 g/cm^{3}
Solubility in water	Reacts
- Except where otherwise noted, data are given for materials in their standard state (at 25 °C [77 °F], 100 kPa). verify (what is ?) Infobox references

Nitrosonium octafluoroxenate(VI) is a chemical compound of xenon with nitrogen, oxygen, and fluorine, having formula (NO)_{2}XeF_{8}. It is an ionic compound containing well-separated nitrosonium cations (NO^{+}) and octafluoroxenate(VI) anions (XeF^{2−}_{8}). The molecular geometry of the octafluoroxenate(VI) ion is square antiprismatic, having Xe–F bond lengths of 1.971 Å, 1.946 Å, 1.958 Å, 2.052 Å, and 2.099 Å.

It is synthesized by the reaction of xenon hexafluoride (XeF_{6}) with nitrosyl fluoride (NOF):

XeF_{6} + 2 NOF → (NO)_{2}XeF_{8}

Other compounds containing the octafluoroxenate(VI) ion include its alkali metal salts, including Cs_{2}XeF_{8} and Rb_{2}XeF_{8}, which are stable up to 400 °C.
