= Snub disphenoid =

Convex polyhedron with 12 triangular faces

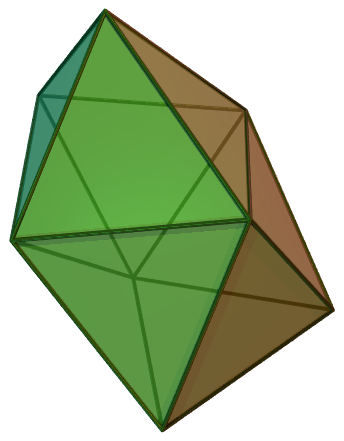
- Type: Deltahedron; Johnson; J_{83} – J_{84} – J_{85}
- Faces: 12 triangles
- Edges: 18
- Vertices: 8
- Vertex configuration: $4 \times (3^4) + 4 \times (3^5)$
- Symmetry group: $D_{2 \mathrm{d}}$
- Dihedral angle (degrees): four edges: 164.2° eight edges: 121.74° six edges: 96.2°
- Properties: convex, elementary

In geometry, the snub disphenoid is a convex polyhedron with 12 equilateral triangles as its faces. It is an example of deltahedron and Johnson solid. It can be constructed in different approaches. This shape is also called Siamese dodecahedron, triangular dodecahedron, trigonal dodecahedron, or dodecadeltahedron.

The snub disphenoid can be visualized as an atom cluster surrounding a central atom, that is, the dodecahedral molecular geometry. Its vertices may be placed on a sphere and can also be used as a minimum possible Lennard-Jones potential among all eight-sphere clusters.

== Construction ==
=== By polyhedra ===
The snub disphenoid, as suggested by the name, is constructed from a tetragonal disphenoid by cutting all the edges from its faces, and adding equilateral triangles that are twisted in a certain angle between them. This process construction is known as snubification.

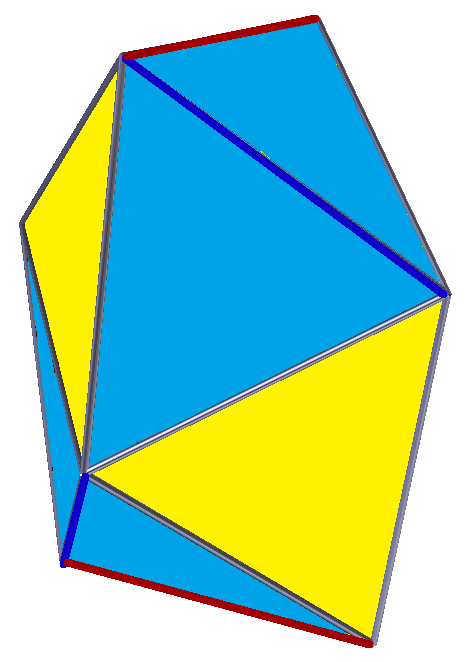
Process of constructing snub disphenoid by snubification by adding light blue equilateral triangles after separating the yellows

Alternative constructions by other polyhedra, however, are as follows:

- By bipyramids. From a triangular bipyramid, by cutting its two edges along the apices, these apices can be pushed toward each other, resulting in the new two vertices pushed away. From pentagonal bipyramid, cutting the two edges along that connecting the base of the bipyramid and then inserting two equilateral triangles between them.
- From the square antiprism by replacing the two square faces with pairs of equilateral triangles. It can also be constructed like the snub square antiprism, but with a digon instead,
- As a digonal gyrobianticupola. It has the same topology and symmetry, but without equilateral triangles. It has four vertices in a square on a center plane as two anticupolae attached with rotational symmetry.

=== Cartesian coordinates ===
The eight vertices of the snub disphenoid may then be given Cartesian coordinates:
$$\begin{align}
(\pm t, r, 0), &\qquad (0, -r, \pm t), \\
(\pm 1, -s, 0), &\qquad (0, s, \pm 1).
\end{align}$$
Here, $q \approx 0.16902$ is the positive real solution of the cubic polynomial $2x^3 +11x^2+4x-1$. The three variables $r$, $s$, and $t$ are expressed by:
$$\begin{align}
r &= \sqrt{q} \approx 0.41112, \\
s &= \sqrt{\frac{1-q}{2q}} \approx 1.56786, \\
t &= 2rs = \sqrt{2-2q} \approx 1.28917.
\end{align}$$
Because this construction involves the solution to a cubic equation, the snub disphenoid cannot be constructed with a compass and straightedge, unlike the other seven deltahedra.

== Properties ==
As a consequence of such constructions, the snub disphenoid has 12 equilateral triangles as its faces. By classification, it is a deltahedron: a polyhedron in which all faces are equilateral triangles. Since its faces are equilateral triangles, which are regular polygons, the snub disphenoid is a Johnson solid, named after American mathematician Norman W. Johnson who listed 92 such convex polyhedra. Out of the 92, five of them are deltahedra: the other four are triangular bipyramid, pentagonal bipyramid, triaugmented triangular prism, and gyroelongated square bipyramid. The snub disphenoid is among them, enumerated as the 84th Johnson solid $J_{84}$. In addition to have 12 equilateral triangular faces, the snub disphenoid has 8 vertices. Four vertices are surrounded by five equilateral triangles, and the remaining number of vertices are surrounded by four equilateral triangles. Thus, the vertex configuration of a snub disphenoid (a notation describing a polyhedron by the number of faces surrounding any vertex) is $4 \times (3^5) + 4 \times (3^4)$. The snub disphenoid is an elementary polyhedron, meaning that it cannot produce convex regular-faced polyhedra again by slicing on its edges with a plane.

The net of a snub disphenoid

A physical model of the snub disphenoid can be formed by unfolding its faces to become an arrangement of 12 equilateral triangles, which is known as a net. There are 1,109 ways to arrange such triangles to become nets. Among of them, 37 nets of a snubd disphenoid, alongside the net of a gyroelongated square bipyramid, can be folded into the net of a regular tetrahedron. In one of them, American mathematician John Montroll suggested a net with a fewer concave vertices on its boundary, making it more convenient for origami construction.

=== Measurement ===
A snub disphenoid with edge length $a$ has a surface area, obtained by the area of 12 equilateral triangles in total:
$$A = 3 \sqrt{3}a^2 \approx 5.19615a^2,$$
Its volume can be calculated as the formula:
$$V \approx 0.85949 a^3.$$

The snub disphenoid has 18 edges, all of which are triangle-to-triangle, forming three different dihedral angles, an angle formed by two polygonal faces. In approximation, four edges form an angle of 164.2°, eight form 121.74°, and six form 96.2°.

=== Symmetry and geodesic ===
3D model of a snub disphenoid

The snub disphenoid has the same symmetries as a tetragonal disphenoid, the antiprismatic symmetry $D_{2 \mathrm{d}}$ of order 8: it has an axis of 180° rotational symmetry through the midpoints of its two opposite edges, two perpendicular planes of reflection symmetry through this axis, and four additional symmetry operations given by a reflection perpendicular to the axis followed by a quarter-turn and possibly another reflection parallel to the axis..

Up to symmetries and parallel translation, the snub disphenoid has five types of simple (non-self-crossing) closed geodesics. These are paths on the surface of the polyhedron that avoid the vertices and locally look like the shortest path: they follow straight line segments across each face of the polyhedron that they intersect, and when they cross an edge of the polyhedron, they make complementary angles on the two incident faces to the edge. Intuitively, one could stretch a rubber band around the polyhedron along this path, and it would stay in place: there is no way to locally change the path and make it shorter. For example, one type of geodesic crosses the two opposite edges of the snub disphenoid at their midpoints (where the symmetry axis exits the polytope) at an angle of $\pi/3$. A second type of geodesic passes near the intersection of the snub disphenoid with the plane that perpendicularly bisects the symmetry axis (the equator of the polyhedron), crossing the edges of eight triangles at angles that alternate between $\pi/2$ and $\pi/6$. Shifting a geodesic on the surface of the polyhedron by a small amount (small enough that the shift does not cause it to cross any vertices) preserves the property of being a geodesic and preserves its length, so both of these examples have shifted versions of the same type that are less symmetrically placed. The lengths of the five simple closed geodesics on a snub disphenoid with unit-length edges are

$2\sqrt{3}\approx 3.464$ (for the equatorial geodesic), $\sqrt{13}\approx 3.606$, $4$ (for the geodesic through the midpoints of opposite edges), $2\sqrt{7}\approx 5.292$, and $\sqrt{19}\approx 4.359$.

Except for the tetrahedron, which has infinitely many types of simple closed geodesics, the snub disphenoid has the most types of geodesics of any deltahedron.

=== Representation by the graph ===
The snub disphenoid is 4-connected, meaning that it takes the removal of four vertices to disconnect the remaining vertices. It is one of only four 4-connected simplicial well-covered polyhedra, meaning that all of the maximal independent sets of its vertices have the same size. The other three polyhedra with this property are the regular octahedron, the pentagonal bipyramid, and an irregular polyhedron with 12 vertices and 20 triangular faces.

The graph of a snub disphenoid (a mathematical structure consisting of 8 vertices connecting 18 edges) is one of only six connected graphs in which the neighborhood of every vertex is a cycle of length four or five, the others being the Fritsch graph, the icosahedral graph, the octahedral graph, and the edge graphs of the pentagonal bipyramid and gyroelongated square bipyramid. More generally, when every vertex in a graph has a cycle of length at least four as its neighborhood, the triangles of the graph automatically link up to form a topological surface called a Whitney triangulation. These six graphs come from the six Whitney triangulations that, when their triangles are equilateral, have positive angular defect at every vertex. This makes them a combinatorial analogue of the positively curved smooth surfaces. They come from six of the eight deltahedra—excluding the two that have a vertex with a triangular neighborhood.

== History of naming and applications ==
The snub disphenoid name comes from Johnson (1966) classification of the Johnson solid, named after American mathematician Norman W. Johnson who listed the convex polyhedra with regular polygonal faces. However, this solid was first studied by Rausenberger (1915). It was studied again in the paper by Freudenthal & van d. Waerden (1947), which first described the set of eight convex deltahedra, and named it the Siamese dodecahedron.

The dodecadeltahedron name was given to the same shape by Bernal (1964), referring to the fact that it is a 12-sided deltahedron. There are other simplicial dodecahedra, such as the hexagonal bipyramid, but this is the only one that can be realized with equilateral faces. Bernal was interested in the shapes of holes left in irregular close-packed arrangements of spheres, so he used a restrictive definition of deltahedra, in which a deltahedron is a convex polyhedron with triangular faces that can be formed by the centers of a collection of congruent spheres, whose tangencies represent polyhedron edges, and such that there is no room to pack another sphere inside the cage created by this system of spheres. This restrictive definition disallows the triangular bipyramid (as forming two tetrahedral holes rather than a single hole), pentagonal bipyramid (because the spheres for its apexes interpenetrate, so it cannot occur in sphere packings), and regular icosahedron (because it has interior room for another sphere). Bernal writes that the snub disphenoid is "a very common coordination for the calcium ion in crystallography". In coordination geometry, it is usually known as the trigonal dodecahedron or simply as the dodecahedron. It is a chemical compound, a polyhedron may be visualized as the atom cluster surrounding a central atom. The dodecahedral molecular geometry describes the cluster for which it is a snub disphenoid.

In the study of computational chemistry and molecular physics, spheres centered at the vertices of the snub disphenoid form a cluster that, according to numerical experiments, has the minimum possible Lennard-Jones potential among all eight-sphere clusters.
