= Square antiprismatic molecular geometry =

Shape of molecular compounds

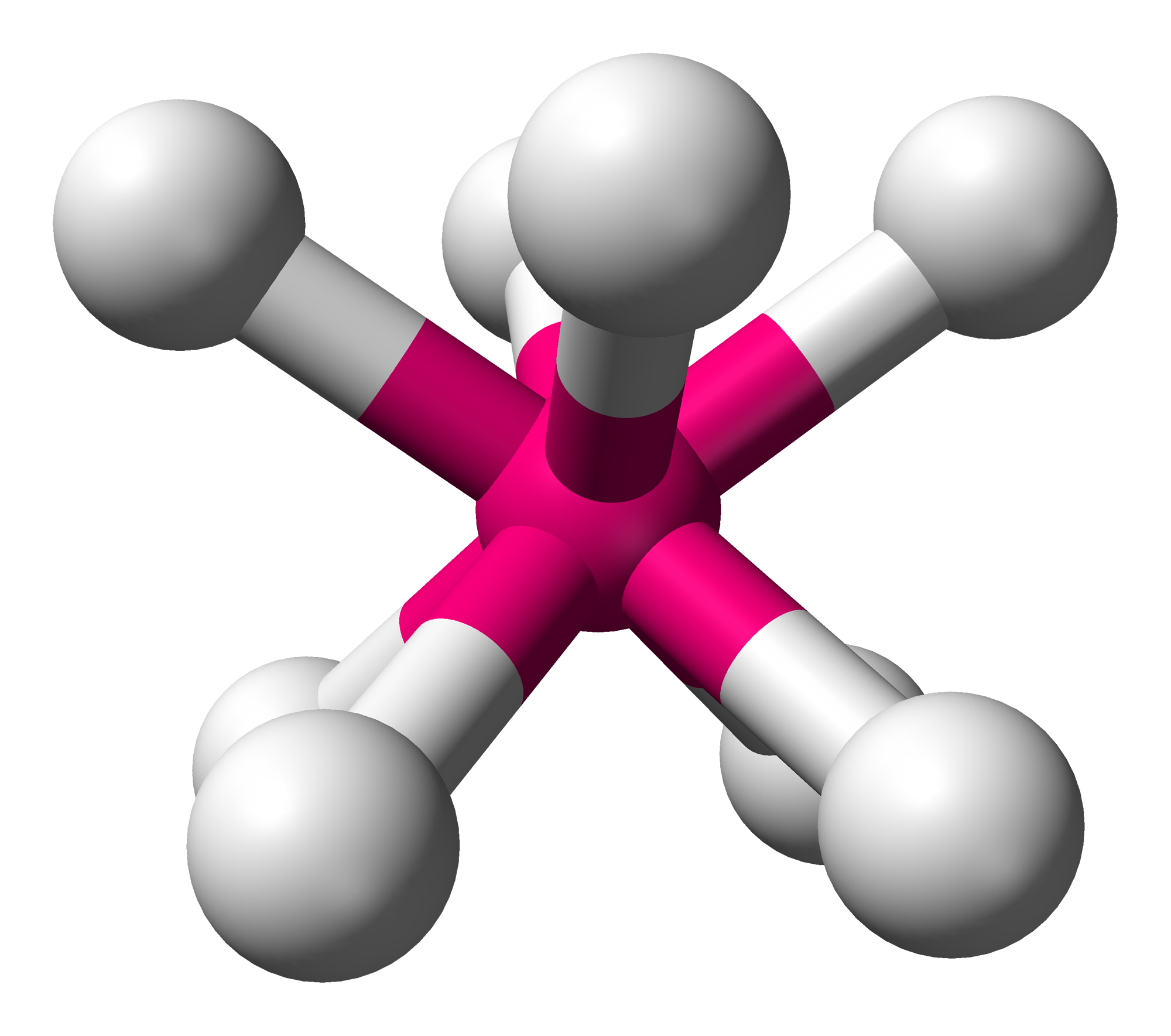
- Examples: XeF^{2−}_{8}, ReF^{−}_{8}
- Point group: D_{4d}
- Coordination number: 8
- μ (Polarity): 0

In chemistry, the square antiprismatic molecular geometry describes the shape of compounds where eight atoms, groups of atoms, or ligands are arranged around a central atom, defining the vertices of a square antiprism. This shape has D_{4d} symmetry and is one of the three common shapes for octacoordinate transition metal complexes, along with the dodecahedron and the bicapped trigonal prism.

Like with other high coordination numbers, eight-coordinate compounds are often distorted from idealized geometries, as illustrated by the structure of Na_{3}TaF_{8}. In this case, with the small Na^{+} ions, lattice forces are strong. With the diatomic cation NO^{+}, the lattice forces are weaker, such as in (NO)_{2}XeF_{8}, which crystallizes with a more idealized square antiprismatic geometry.

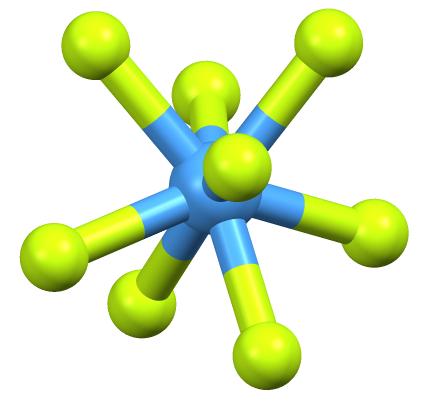
The distorted square antiprismatic [TaF_{8}]^{3−} anion in the Na_{3}TaF_{8} lattice.

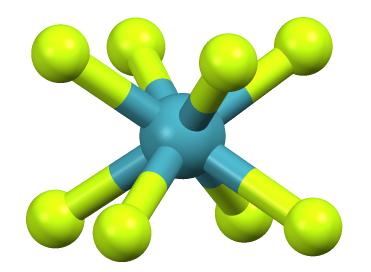
The square antiprismatic [XeF_{8}]^{2−} anion in the lattice of nitrosonium octafluoroxenate(VI), (NO)_{2}XeF_{8}.

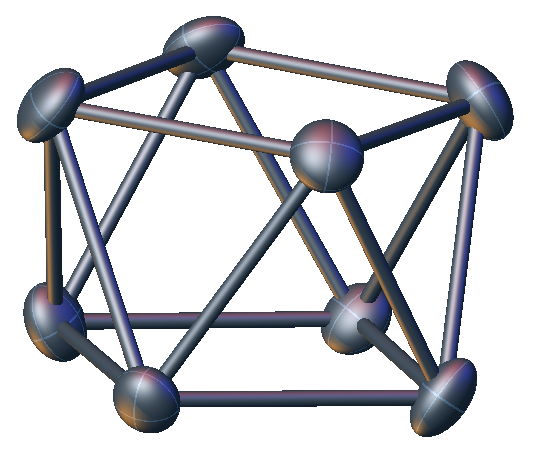
Structure of the Bi^{2+}_{8} cluster in the [Bi_{8}](GaCl_{4})_{2}.

== Examples ==
- XeF^{2−}_{8}
- IF^{−}_{8}
- ReF^{−}_{8}

== Square prismatic geometry and cubic geometry ==
Square prismatic geometry (D_{4h}) is much less common compared to the square antiprism. An example of a molecular species with square prismatic geometry (a slightly flattened cube) is octafluoroprotactinate(V), [PaF_{8}]^{3–}, as found in its sodium salt, Na_{3}PaF_{8}. While local cubic 8-coordination is common in ionic lattices (e.g., Ca^{2+} in CaF_{2}), and some 8-coordinate actinide complexes are approximately cubic, there are no reported examples of rigorously cubic 8-coordinate molecular species. A number of other rare geometries for 8-coordination are also known.
