= Polyhedral symbol =

Symbol used in coordination chemistry

The polyhedral symbol is sometimes used in coordination chemistry and crystallography to indicate the approximate coordination geometry around the central atom. One or more italicised letters indicate the geometry, e.g. TP-3 which is followed by a number that gives the coordination number of the central atom. The polyhedral symbol can be used in naming of compounds, in which case it is followed by the configuration index.

== Polyhedral symbols ==
Polyhedral symbols
Coord. no.	IUPAC	IUCr	description	
2	L-2	[2l]	linear	Linear (chemistry)
2	A-2	[2n]	bent	Bent (chemistry)
3	TP-3	[3l]	trigonal planar	Trigonal planar
3	TPY-3	[3n]	trigonal pyramidal	Trigonal pyramid (chemistry)
3	TS-3	[3n]	T-shaped	T-shaped (chemistry)
4	T-4	[4t]	tetrahedral geometry	Tetrahedral molecular geometry
4	SP-4	[4l]	square planar	Square planar
4	SPY-4	[4n]	square pyramidal	
4	SS-4	[4n]	see-saw	Seesaw (chemistry)
5	TBPY-5	[5by]	trigonal bipyramidal	Trigonal bipyramidal molecular geometry
5	SPY-5	[5y]	square pyramidal	Square pyramidal molecular geometry
6	OC-6	[6o]	octahedral geometry	Octahedral molecular geometry
6	TPR-6	[6p]	trigonal prismatic	Trigonal prismatic molecular geometry
6	-	[6ap]	trigonal antiprismatic	(stretched/compressed octahedral molecular geometry)
7	PBPY-7	[7by]	pentagonal bipyramid	Pentagonal bipyramid molecular geometry
7	OCF-7	-	face capped octahedron	Capped octahedral molecular geometry
7	TPRS-7	[6p1c]	trigonal prism, square face monocapped	Capped trigonal prismatic molecular geometry
8	CU-8	[8cb]	cubic	Cubic molecular geometry
8	-	[8p]	tetragonal prism	(stretched/compressed cubic molecular geometry)
8	SAPR-8	[8acb]	square antiprism	Square antiprismatic molecular geometry
8	-	[8ap]	tetragonal antiprism	(stretched/compressed square antiprismatic molecular geometry)
8	DD-8	[8do]	dodecahedral	Dodecahedral molecular geometry
8	HBPY-8	[8by]	hexagonal bipyramid	
8	OCT-8	-	octahedron, trans-bicapped	
8	TPRT-8	[6p2c]	trigonal prism, triangular face bicapped	
8	TPRS-8	-	trigonal prism, square face bicapped	Bicapped trigonal prismatic molecular geometry
9	TPRS-9	[6p3c]	trigonal prism, square face tricapped	Tricapped trigonal prismatic molecular geometry
9	HBPY-9	[9by]	heptagonal bipyramid	
12	-	[12i]	icosahedron	
12	-	[12co]	cuboctahedron	
12	-	[12aco]	anticuboctahedron (triangular orthobicupola)	

== Configuration index ==
The first step in determining the configuration index is to assign a priority number to each coordinating ligand according to the Cahn-Ingold-Prelog priority rules, (CIP rules). The preferred ligand takes the lowest priority number. For example, of the ligands acetonitrile, chloride ion, and pyridine the priority number assigned are chloride, 1; acetonitrile, 2; pyridene, 3. Each coordination type has a different procedure for specifying the configuration index and these are outlined in below.

=== T-shaped (TS-3) ===
The configuration index is a single digit which is defined as the priority number of the ligand on the stem of the "T".

=== Seesaw (SS- 4) ===
The configuration index has two digits which are the priority numbers of the ligands separated by the largest angle. The lowest priority number of the pair is quoted first.

=== Square planar (SP-4) ===
The configuration index is a single digit which is the priority number of the ligand trans to the highest priority ligand. (If there are two possibilities the principle of trans difference is applied). As an example, (acetonitrile)dichlorido(pyridine)platinum(II) complex where the Cl ligands may be trans or cis to one another.
The ligand priority numbers are, applying the CIP rules:

- two chlorides of priority number 1
- acetonitrile priority 2
- pyridine priority 3

In the trans case the configuration index is 1 giving the name(SP-4-1)-(acetonitrile)dichlorido(pyridine)platinum(II).
In the cis case both of the organic ligands are trans to a chloride so to choose the trans difference is considered and the greater is between 1 and three therefore the name is (SP-4-3)-(acetonitrile)dichlorido(pyridine)platinum(II).

=== Octahedral (OC-6) ===
The configuration index has two digits. The first digit is the priority number of the ligand trans to the highest priority ligand. This pair is then used to define the reference axis of the octahedron. The second digit is the priority number of the ligand trans to the highest priority ligand in the plane perpendicular to the reference axis.

=== Square pyramidal (SPY-4) ===
The configuration index is a single digit which is the priority number of the ligand trans to the ligand of lowest priority in the plane perpendicular to the 4 fold axis. (If there is more than one choice then the highest numerical value second digit is taken.) NB this procedure gives the same result as SP-4, however in this case the polyhedral symbol specifies that the complex is non-planar.

=== Square pyramidal (SPY-5) ===
There are two digits. The first digit is the priority number of the ligand on the fourfold (C_{4}) axis of the idealised pyramid the second digit is the priority number of the ligand trans to ligand of lowest priority in the plane perpendicular to the 4 fold axis. (If there is more than one choice then the highest numerical value second digit is taken.)

=== Trigonal bipyramidal (TBPY-5) ===
The configuration index consists of two digits which are the priority numbers of the ligands on the threefold rotation axis. The lowest numerical value is cited first.

=== Other bipyramidal structures (PBPY-7, HBPY-8 and HBPY-9) ===
The configuration index consists of two segments separated by a hyphen. The first segment consists of two digits which are the priority numbers of the ligands on the five, six or sevenfold rotation axis. The lowest numerical value is cited first.

The second segment consists of 5, 6 or 7 digits respectively. The lowest priority number is the first digit followed by the digits of the other atoms in the plane. The clockwise and anticlockwise sequences are compared and the one that yields the lowest numerical sequence is chosen.
