= Ryutaro Tsuchida =

Japanese chemist (1903–1962)

- 槌田·龍太郎
- Born: April 20, 1903; Kyoto, Japan
- Died: May 9, 1962 (aged 59)
- Known for: VSEPR theory
- Scientific career
- Institutions: Osaka University

Ryutaro Tsuchida (槌田·龍太郎; 1903-1962) was a Japanese chemist.

Tsuchida graduated from Tokyo University in (昭和3年，Shōwa era 3rd) 1928. In June 1935, he established a fifth course at Osaka University. In 1939, he originally proposed the correlation between molecular geometry and number of valence electron pairs (both shared and unshared pairs). This concept was later developed into the VSEPR theory of molecular geometry.
