= Inert-pair effect =

Reluctance of s-orbitals to take part in bond formation

The inert-pair effect is the tendency of the two electrons in the outermost atomic s-orbital to remain unshared in compounds of post-transition metals. The term inert-pair effect is often used in relation to the increasing stability of oxidation states that are two less than the group valency for the heavier elements of groups 13, 14, 15 and 16. The term "inert pair" was first proposed by Nevil Sidgwick in 1927. The name suggests that the outermost s electron pairs are more tightly bound to the nucleus in these atoms, and therefore more difficult to ionize or share.

For example, the p-block elements of the 4th, 5th and 6th period come after d-block elements, but the electrons present in the intervening d- (and f-) orbitals do not effectively shield the s-electrons of the valence shell. As a result, the inert pair of ns electrons remains more tightly held by the nucleus and hence participates less in bond formation.

== Description ==
Consider as an example thallium (Tl) in group 13. The +1 oxidation state of Tl is the most stable, while Tl^{3+} compounds are comparatively rare. The stability of the +1 oxidation state increases in the following sequence:

Al^{+} < Ga^{+} < In^{+} < Tl^{+}.

The same trend in stability is noted in groups 14, 15 and 16. The heaviest members of each group, i.e. lead, bismuth and polonium are comparatively stable in oxidation states +2, +3, and +4 respectively.

The lower oxidation state in each of the elements in question has two valence electrons in s orbitals. A partial explanation is that the valence electrons in an s orbital are more tightly bound and are of lower energy than electrons in p orbitals and therefore less likely to be involved in bonding. If the total ionization energies (IE) (see below) of the two electrons in s orbitals (the 2nd + 3rd ionization energies) are examined, it can be seen that there is an expected decrease from B to Al associated with increased atomic size, but the values for Ga, In and Tl are higher than expected.

Ionization energies for group 13 elements kJ/mol
IE	Boron	Aluminium	Gallium	Indium	Thallium
1st	800	577	578	558	589
2nd	2427	1816	1979	1820	1971
3rd	3659	2744	2963	2704	2878
2nd + 3rd	6086	4560	4942	4524	4849

The high ionization energy (IE) (2nd + 3rd) of gallium is explained by d-block contraction, and the higher IE (2nd + 3rd) of thallium relative to indium, has been explained by relativistic effects. The higher value for thallium compared to indium is partly attributable to the influence of the lanthanide contraction and the ensuing poor shielding from the nuclear charge by the intervening filled 4d and 5f subshells.

An important consideration is that compounds in the lower oxidation state are ionic, whereas the compounds in the higher oxidation state tend to be covalent. Therefore, covalency effects must be taken into account. An alternative explanation of the inert pair effect by Drago in 1958 attributed the effect to low M−X bond enthalpies for the heavy p-block elements and the fact that it requires less energy to oxidize an element to a low oxidation state than to a higher oxidation state. This energy has to be supplied by ionic or covalent bonds, so if bonding to a particular element is weak, the high oxidation state may be inaccessible. Further work involving relativistic effects confirms this.

In the case of groups 13 to 15 the inert-pair effect has been further attributed to "the decrease in bond energy with the increase in size from Al to Tl so that the energy required to involve the s electron in bonding is not compensated by the energy released in forming the two additional bonds". That said, the authors note that several factors are at play, including relativistic effects in the case of gold, and that "a quantitative rationalisation of all the data has not been achieved".

== Steric activity of the lone pair ==
The chemical inertness of the s electrons in the lower oxidation state is not always related to steric inertness (where steric inertness means that the presence of the s-electron lone pair has little or no influence on the geometry of the molecule or crystal). A simple example of steric activity is SnCl_{2}, which is bent in accordance with VSEPR theory. Some examples where the lone pair appears to be inactive are bismuth(III) iodide, BiI_{3}, and the BiI_{6}^{3−} anion. In both of these the central Bi atom is octahedrally coordinated with little or no distortion, in contravention to VSEPR theory. The steric activity of the lone pair has long been assumed to be due to the orbital having some p character, i.e. the orbital is not spherically symmetric. More recent theoretical work shows that this is not always necessarily the case. For example, the litharge structure of PbO contrasts to the more symmetric and simpler rock-salt structure of PbS, and this has been explained in terms of Pb^{II}–anion interactions in PbO leading to an asymmetry in electron density. Similar interactions do not occur in PbS. Another example are some thallium(I) salts where the asymmetry has been ascribed to s electrons on Tl interacting with antibonding orbitals.
