= Electron localization function =

Method of measuring the extent of spatial localization of an electron

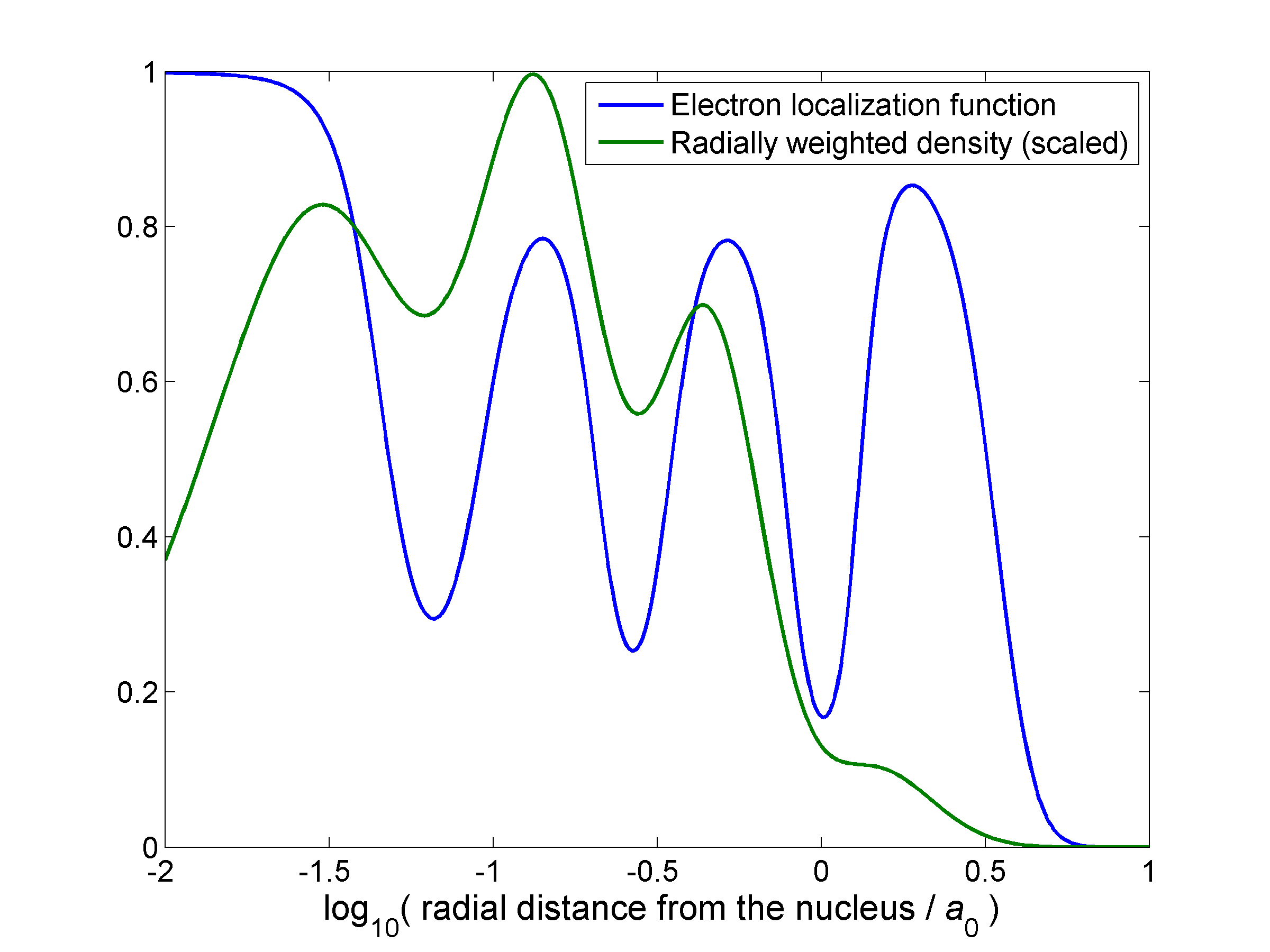
Electron localization function of the krypton atom at the Hartree–Fock / cc-pV5Z level of theory. Also shown is the radial density, 4πr^{2}ρ(r), scaled by a factor of 0.0375.

In quantum chemistry, the electron localization function (ELF) is a measure of the likelihood of finding an electron in the neighborhood space of a reference electron located at a given point and with the same spin. Physically, this measures the extent of spatial localization of the reference electron and provides a method for the mapping of electron pair probability in multielectronic systems.

ELF's usefulness stems from the observation that it allows electron localization to be analyzed in a chemically intuitive way. For example, the shell structure of heavy atoms is obvious when plotting ELF against the radial distance from the nucleus; the ELF for radon has six clear maxima, whereas the electron density decreases monotonically and the radially weighted density fails to show all shells. When applied to molecules, an analysis of the ELF shows a clear separation between the core and valence electron, and also shows covalent bonds and lone pairs, in what has been called "a faithful visualization of VSEPR theory in action". Another feature of the ELF is that it is invariant concerning the transformation of the molecular orbitals.

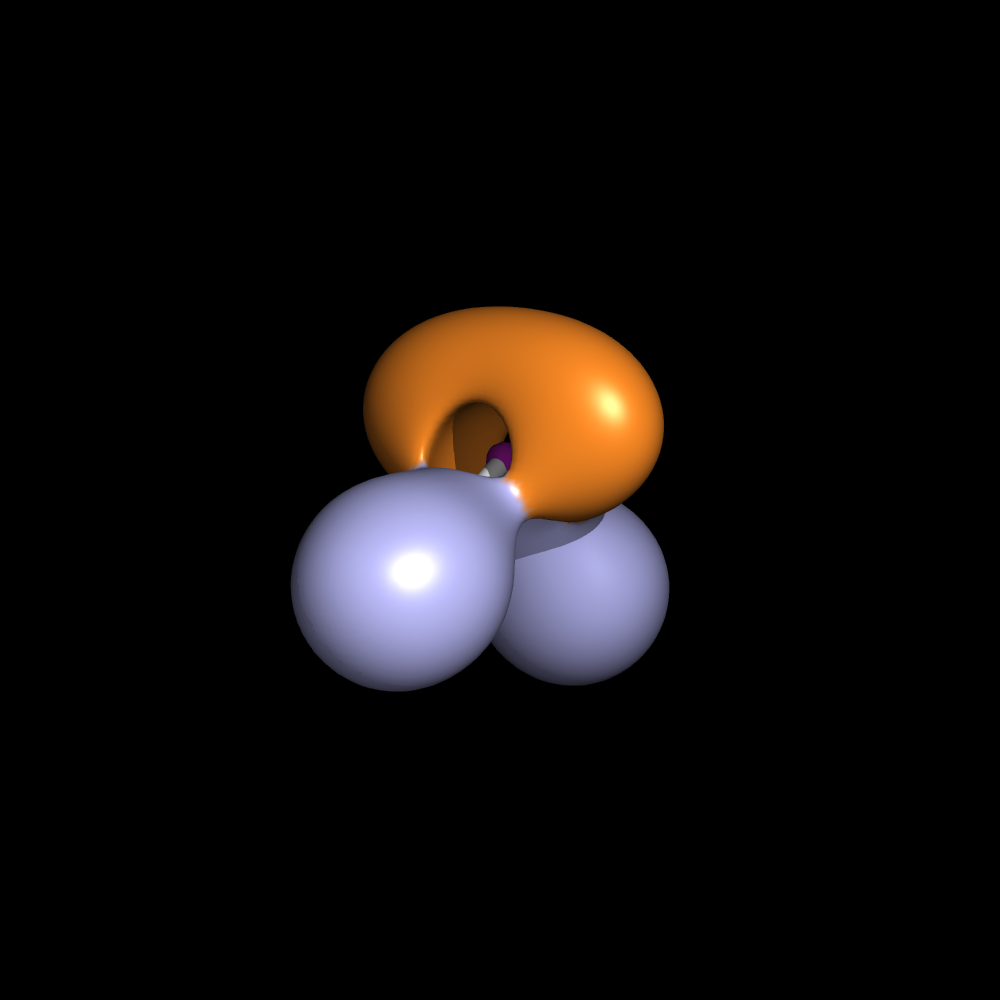
Image of the ELF of water at level 0.8, generated using PyMOL

The ELF was originally defined by Becke and Edgecombe in 1990. They first argued that a measure of the electron localization is provided by

$$D_\sigma(\mathbf{r}) = \tau_\sigma(\mathbf{r}) - \tfrac{1}{4} \frac{(\nabla\rho_\sigma(\mathbf{r}))^2}{\rho_\sigma(\mathbf{r})},$$

where ρ is the electron spin density and τ the kinetic energy density. The second term (negative term) is the bosonic kinetic energy density, so D is the contribution due to fermions. D is expected to be small in those regions of space where localized electrons are to be found. Given the arbitrariness of the magnitude of the localization measure provided by D, it is compared to the corresponding value for a uniform electron gas with spin density equal to ρ(r), which is given by

$$D^0_\sigma(\mathbf{r}) = \tfrac{3}{5}(6 \pi^2)^{2/3} \rho^{5/3}_\sigma(\mathbf{r}).$$

The ratio,

$$\chi_\sigma(\mathbf{r}) = \frac{D_\sigma(\mathbf{r})}{D^0_\sigma(\mathbf{r})},$$

is a dimensionless localization index that expresses electron localization for the uniform electron gas. In the final step, the ELF is defined in terms of χ by mapping its values on to the range 0 ≤ ELF ≤ 1 by defining the electron localization function as

$$\mathrm{ELF}(\mathbf{r}) = \frac{1}{1 + \chi^2_\sigma(\mathbf{r})}.$$

ELF = 1 corresponding to perfect localization and ELF = 1/2 corresponding to the electron gas.

The original derivation was based on Hartree–Fock theory. For density functional theory, the approach was generalized by Andreas Savin in 1992, who also have applied the formulation to examining various chemical and materials systems. In 1994, Bernard Silvi and Andreas Savin developed a method for explaining ELFs using differential topology.

The approach of electron localization, in the form of atoms in molecules (AIM), was pioneered by Richard Bader. Bader's analysis partitions the charge density in a molecule to "atoms" according to zero-flux surfaces (surfaces across which no electron flow is taking place). Bader's analysis allows many properties such as multipole moments, energies and forces, to be partitioned in a defensible and consistent manner to individual atoms within molecules.

Both the Bader approach and the ELF approach to partitioning of molecular properties have gained popularity in recent years because the fastest, accurate ab-initio calculations of molecular properties are now mostly made using density functional theory (DFT), which directly calculates the electron density. This electron density is then analyzed using the Bader charge analysis of ELFs. One of the most popular functionals in DFT was first proposed by Becke, who also originated ELFs.
