= Seesaw molecular geometry =

Structural molecular geometry

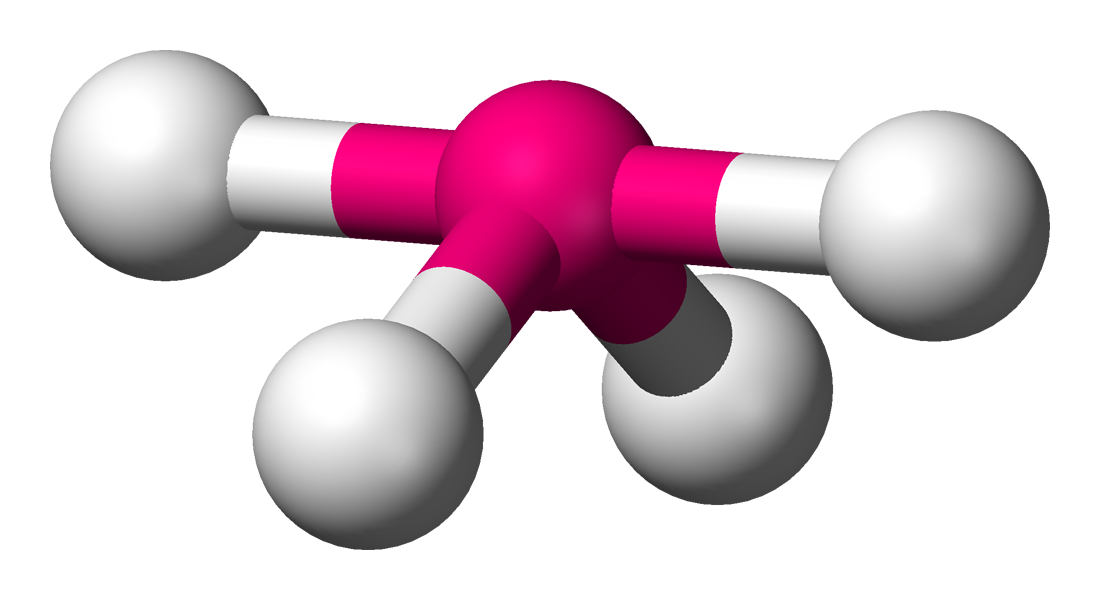
- Examples: SF_{4}
- Point group: C_{2v}
- Coordination number: 4
- Bond angle(s): Ideal ax-ax 180°, eq-eq 120°, ax-eq 90° SF_{4} ax-ax 173.1°, eq-eq 101.6°
- μ (Polarity): >0

Disphenoidal or seesaw (also known as sawhorse) is a type of molecular geometry where there are four bonds to a central atom with overall C_{2v} molecular symmetry. The name "seesaw" comes from the observation that it looks like a playground seesaw. Most commonly, four bonds to a central atom result in tetrahedral or, less commonly, square planar geometry.

The seesaw geometry occurs when a molecule has a steric number of 5, with the central atom being bonded to 4 other atoms and 1 lone pair (AX_{4}E_{1} in AXE notation). An atom bonded to 5 other atoms (and no lone pairs) forms a trigonal bipyramid with two axial and three equatorial positions, but in the seesaw geometry one of the atoms is replaced by a lone pair of electrons, which is always in an equatorial position. This is true because the lone pair occupies more space near the central atom (A) than does a bonding pair of electrons. An equatorial lone pair is repelled by only two bonding pairs at 90°, whereas a hypothetical axial lone pair would be repelled by three bonding pairs at 90° which would make the molecule unstable. Repulsion by bonding pairs at 120° is much smaller and less important.

== Structure ==
Compounds with disphenoidal (see-saw) geometry have two types of ligands: axial and equatorial. The axial pair lie along a common bond axis so that are related by a bond angle of 180°. The equatorial pair of ligands is situated in a plane orthogonal to the axis of the axial pair. Typically the bond distance to the axial ligands is longer than to the equatorial ligands. The ideal angle between the axial ligands and the equatorial ligands is 90°; whereas the ideal angle between the two equatorial ligands themselves is 120°.

Disphenoidal molecules, like trigonal bipyramidal ones, are subject to Berry pseudorotation in which the axial ligands move to equatorial positions and vice versa. This exchange of positions results in similar time-averaged environments for the two types of ligands. Thus, the ^{19}F NMR spectrum of SF_{4} (like that of PF_{5}) consists of single resonance near room temperature. The four atoms in motion act as a lever about the central atom; for example, the four fluorine atoms of sulfur tetrafluoride rotate around the sulfur atom.

== Examples ==
Sulfur tetrafluoride is the premier example of a molecule with the disphenoidal molecular geometry (see image at upper right). The following compounds and ions have disphenoidal geometry:

- SF_{4}
- SeF_{4}
- IF_{2}O^{−}_{2}
- IOF_{3}
- ClF^{+}_{4}
- TeF_{4}
- XeO_{2}F_{2}
- SCl_{4}
- AsF^{−}_{4}

== See also ==
- Molecular geometry
- AXE method
