= Trigonal bipyramidal molecular geometry =

Molecular structure with atoms at the center and vertices of a triangular bipyramid

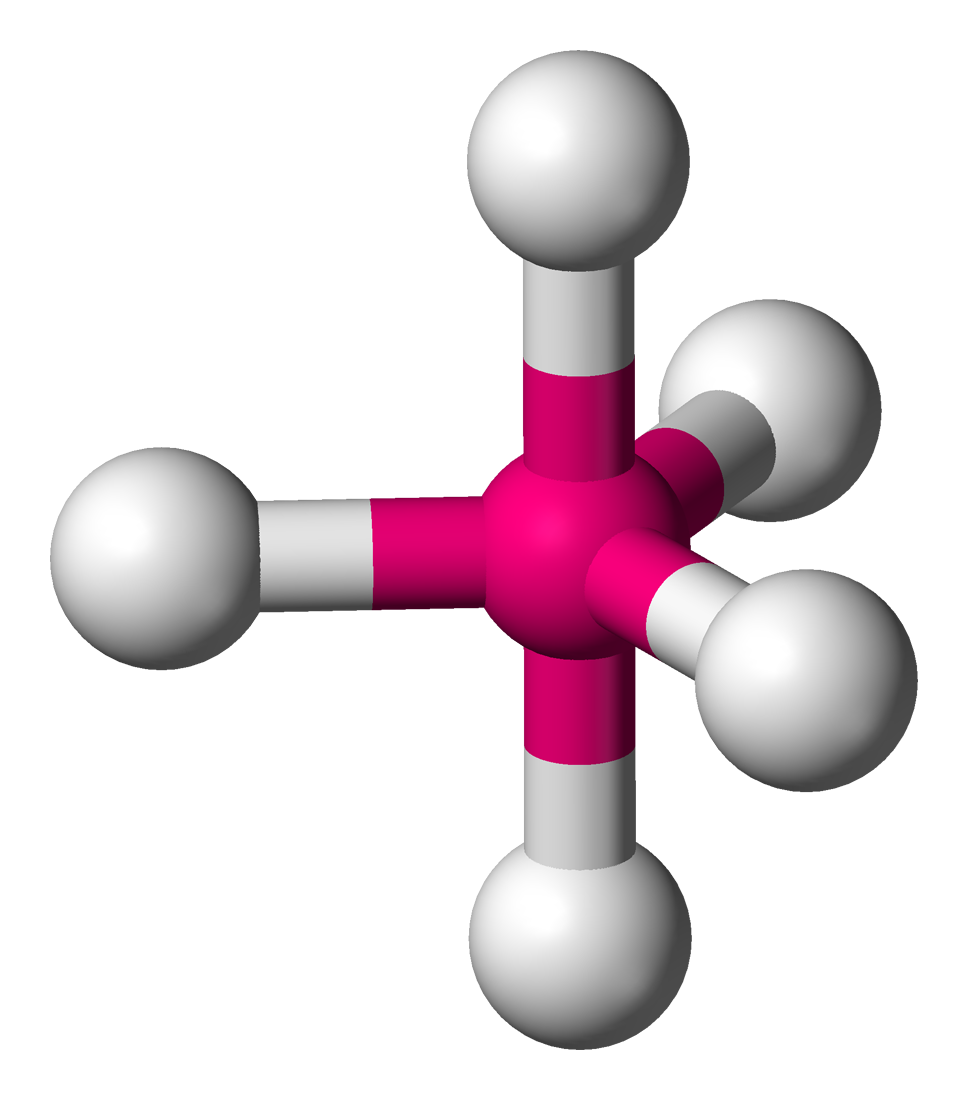
- Examples: PF_{5}, Fe(CO)_{5}
- Point group: D_{3h}
- Coordination number: 5
- Bond angle(s): 90°, 120°
- μ (Polarity): 0

In chemistry, a trigonal bipyramid formation is a molecular geometry with one atom at the center and 5 more atoms at the corners of a triangular bipyramid. This is one geometry for which the bond angles surrounding the central atom are not identical (see also pentagonal bipyramid), because there is no geometrical arrangement with five terminal atoms in equivalent positions. Examples of this molecular geometry are phosphorus pentafluoride (PF_{5}), and phosphorus pentachloride (PCl_{5}) in the gas phase.

== Axial (or apical) and equatorial positions ==
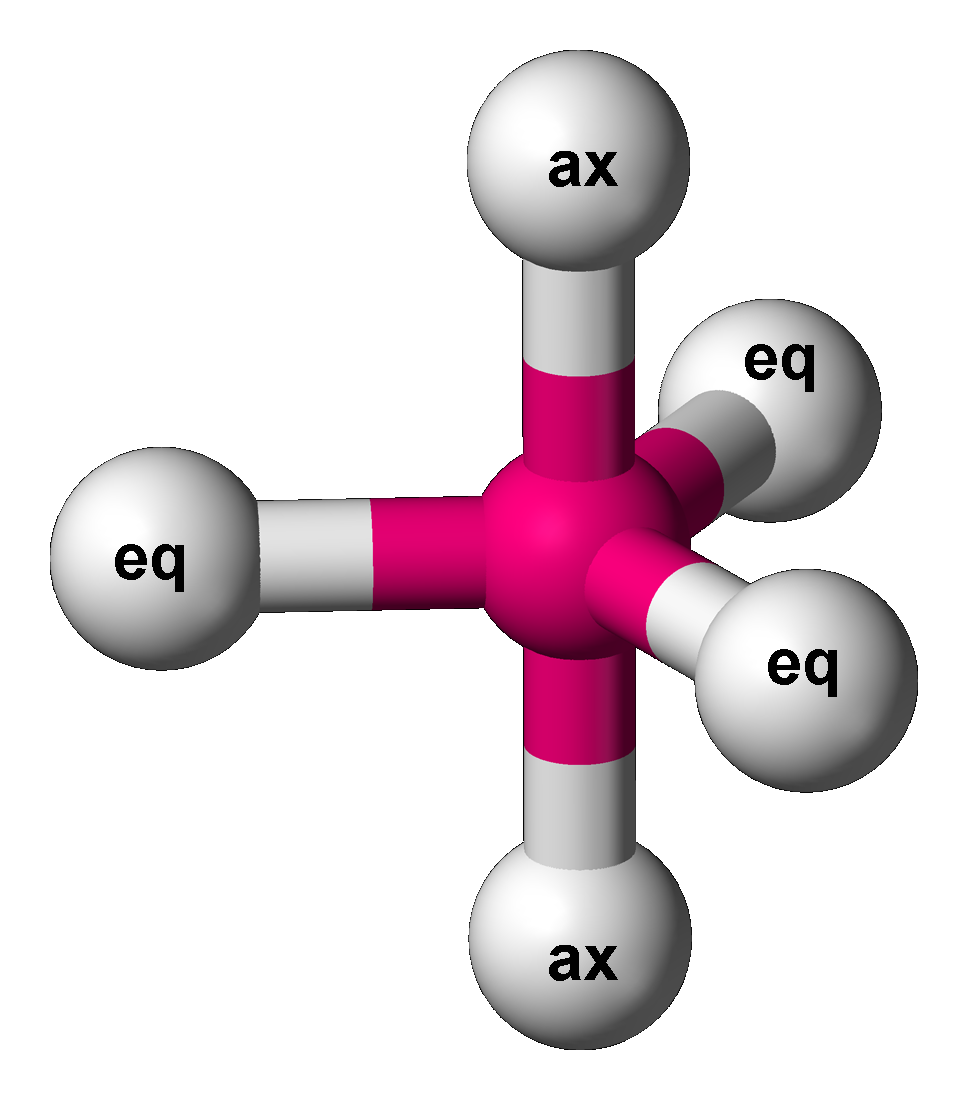
Trigonal bipyramidal molecular shape ax = axial ligand (on unique axis) eq = equatorial ligand (in plane perpendicular to unique axis)

The five atoms bonded to the central atom are not all equivalent, and two different types of position are defined. For phosphorus pentachloride as an example, the phosphorus atom shares a plane with three chlorine atoms at 120° angles to each other in equatorial positions, and two more chlorine atoms above and below the plane (axial or apical positions).

According to the VSEPR theory of molecular geometry, an axial position is more crowded because an axial atom has three neighboring equatorial atoms (on the same central atom) at a 90° bond angle, whereas an equatorial atom has only two neighboring axial atoms at a 90° bond angle. For molecules with five identical ligands, the axial bond lengths tend to be longer because the ligand atom cannot approach the central atom as closely. As examples, in PF_{5} the axial P−F bond length is 158 pm and the equatorial is 152 pm, and in PCl_{5} the axial and equatorial are 214 and 202 pm respectively.

In the mixed halide PF_{3}Cl_{2} the chlorines occupy two of the equatorial positions, indicating that fluorine has a greater apicophilicity or tendency to occupy an axial position. In general ligand apicophilicity increases with electronegativity and also with pi-electron withdrawing ability, as in the sequence Cl < F < CN. Both factors decrease electron density in the bonding region near the central atom so that crowding in the axial position is less important.

== Related geometries with lone pairs ==
The VSEPR theory also predicts that substitution of a ligand at a central atom by a lone pair of valence electrons leaves the general form of the electron arrangement unchanged with the lone pair now occupying one position. For molecules with five pairs of valence electrons including both bonding pairs and lone pairs, the electron pairs are still arranged in a trigonal bipyramid but one or more equatorial positions is not attached to a ligand atom so that the molecular geometry (for the nuclei only) is different.

The seesaw molecular geometry is found in sulfur tetrafluoride (SF_{4}) with a central sulfur atom surrounded by four fluorine atoms occupying two axial and two equatorial positions, as well as one equatorial lone pair, corresponding to an AX_{4}E molecule in the AXE notation. A T-shaped molecular geometry is found in chlorine trifluoride (ClF_{3}), an AX_{3}E_{2} molecule with fluorine atoms in two axial and one equatorial position, as well as two equatorial lone pairs. Finally, the triiodide ion (I^{−}_{3}) is also based upon a trigonal bipyramid, but the actual molecular geometry is linear with terminal iodine atoms in the two axial positions only and the three equatorial positions occupied by lone pairs of electrons (AX_{2}E_{3}); another example of this geometry is provided by xenon difluoride, XeF_{2}.

== Berry pseudorotation ==
Isomers with a trigonal bipyramidal geometry are able to interconvert through a process known as Berry pseudorotation. Pseudorotation is similar in concept to the movement of a conformational diastereomer, though no full revolutions are completed. In the process of pseudorotation, two equatorial ligands (both of which have a shorter bond length than the third) "shift" toward the molecule's axis, while the axial ligands simultaneously "shift" toward the equator, creating a constant cyclical movement. Pseudorotation is particularly notable in simple molecules such as phosphorus pentafluoride (PF_{5}).

== See also ==
- AXE method
- Molecular geometry
