= Nevil Sidgwick =

English theoretical chemist (1873–1952)

Nevil Sidgwick FRS
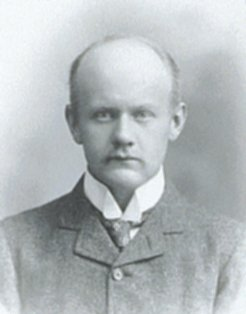
- Born: 8 May 1873; Oxford, England
- Died: 15 March 1952 (aged 78); Oxford, England
- Education: Christ Church, Oxford; University of Tübingen
- Known for: Valency
- Awards: Royal Medal (1937); Longstaff Prize (1945); Fellow of the Royal Society
- Scientific career
- Fields: Chemistry
- Workplaces: University of Oxford
- Doctoral advisor: Hans von Pechmann (University of Tübingen)

Nevil Vincent Sidgwick FRS (8 May 1873 – 15 March 1952) was an English theoretical chemist who made significant contributions to the theory of valency and chemical bonding.

== Biography ==
Sidgwick was born in Park Town, Oxford, the elder of two children of William Carr Sidgwick, lecturer at Oriel College, and Sarah Isabella (née Thompson), descended from a notable family; her uncle was Thomas Perronet Thompson.

He was initially educated at Summer Fields School but, after a year, he entered Rugby School in 1886. From there he was elected to an open scholarship in Natural Science at Christ Church, Oxford. He gained a first in 1895, and went on to gain another first in Greats in 1897, a very rare feat. His principal interest, though, was science, and he spent some time in Wilhelm Ostwald’s laboratory in Germany, where he fell ill and had to go home. He returned to Germany in the autumn of 1899, this time in Hans von Pechmann’s lab at the University of Tübingen. His researches on derivatives of acetone-dicarboxylic acid resulted in his being award a DSc in 1901.

Sidgwick was elected to a Fellowship at Lincoln College, where he went into residence in October 1901 and remained for the rest of his life.

In 1914 Sidgwick was one of the members of the party chosen to represent the British Association for the meeting held in Australia. On 1 July he set sail on the maiden voyage of the Euripides from London to Brisbane, disembarking at Adelaide. A fellow first-class passenger was Sir Ernest Rutherford, who had been knighted that year. Sidgwick became a devotee of the physicist, and would hear no criticism of him in later years. On the return journey, via Penang, in November 1914, a fellow passenger on the Kashima Maru was the astronomer and physicist Professor A S Eddington.

Sidgwick became absorbed by the study of atomic structure and its importance in chemical bonding. He explained the bonding in coordination compounds (complexes), with a convincing account of the significance of the dative bond. Together with his students he demonstrated the existence and wide-ranging importance of the hydrogen bond. He was elected a Fellow of the Royal Society in 1922.

In 1927, he proposed the inert pair effect which describes the stability of heavier p-block atoms in an oxidation state two less than the maximum. In 1940 his Bakerian lecture with Herbert Marcus Powell correlated molecular geometry with the number of valence electrons on a central atom. These ideas were later developed into the VSEPR theory by Gillespie and Nyholm.

The scope and significance of his researches brought international fame for Sidgwick. He travelled to Toronto for a British Association meeting in 1924, and then explored much of western Canada. Another BA meeting in 1929 took him to Cape Town and then Dar es Salaam, Zanzibar, and back home via Aden and Suez. Two years later he was off to spend a semester at Cornell University, via New York and Princeton University. Cornell provided him “with every luxury that an American laboratory can supply. Two offices, four telephones, a private laboratory, and a stenographer, all to myself. . . It is a wonderful place, with a great deal of good work going on, and everybody is most kind, so that I can see that I am going to have a very pleasant time here.” His stay at Ithaca was followed by a 10,000 mile trip to the West and back via Yellowstone National Park, Buffalo, Ottawa and Quebec.

Back in Oxford, he concentrated as much as he could on new books, and revisions to earlier ones, but was diverted by his serving on several committees. He had several more trips to the United States in the 1930s and later, culminating in a voyage on the Britannic from Liverpool to New York on 27 July 1951. He was given a warm reception at the American Chemical Society meeting in New York in early September, having earlier had the chance to visit Oak Ridge National Laboratory.

Nevil Vincent Sidgwick died, unmarried, at the Acland Nursing Home, Oxford, on 15 March 1952, leaving effects worth £67,000.

=== Selected works ===
- The Organic Chemistry of Nitrogen (1910)
- The Electronic Theory of Valency (1927)
- Some Physical Properties of the Covalent Link in Chemistry (1933)
- The Chemical Elements and their Compounds (1950)

=== Appointments ===
- Baker Lecturer at Cornell University, Ithaca, NY, USA (1931)
- President of the Faraday Society (1932-1934)
- Vice President of the Royal Society (1935-1937)
- President of the Chemical Society (1935-1937)

The Sidgwick Laboratory in the Dyson Perrins Laboratory for organic chemistry and Sidgwick Close in front of the Inorganic Chemistry Laboratory at the University of Oxford were named after him.
