= Lewis structure =

Diagrams for the bonding between atoms of a molecule and lone pairs of electrons

Lewis structure of a water molecule

Lewis structures – also called Lewis dot formulas, Lewis dot structures, electron dot structures, or Lewis electron dot structures (LEDs) – are diagrams that show the bonding between atoms of a molecule, as well as the lone pairs of electrons that may exist in the molecule. Introduced by Gilbert N. Lewis in his 1916 article The Atom and the Molecule, a Lewis structure can be drawn for any covalently bonded molecule, as well as coordination compounds. Lewis structures extend the concept of the electron dot diagram by adding lines between atoms to represent shared pairs in a chemical bond.

Lewis structures show each atom and its position in the structure of the molecule using its chemical symbol. Lines are drawn between atoms that are bonded to one another (pairs of dots can be used instead of lines). Excess electrons that form lone pairs are represented as pairs of dots, and are placed next to the atoms.

Although main group elements of the second period and beyond usually react by gaining, losing, or sharing electrons until they have achieved a valence shell electron configuration with a full octet of (8) electrons, hydrogen instead obeys the duplet rule, forming one bond for a complete valence shell of two electrons.

== Construction and electron counting ==
Comparison between electron dot diagrams and Lewis structure

For a neutral molecule, the total number of electrons represented in a Lewis structure is equal to the sum of the numbers of valence electrons on each individual atom, not the maximum possible. Non-valence electrons are not represented in Lewis structures as they do not bond.

Once the total number of valence electrons has been determined, they are placed into the structure according to these steps:

1. Initially, one line (representing a single bond) is drawn between each pair of connected atoms.
2. Each bond consists of a pair of electrons, so if t is the total number of electrons to be placed and n is the number of single bonds just drawn, t − 2n electrons remain to be placed. These are temporarily drawn as dots, one per electron, to a maximum of eight per atom (two in the case of hydrogen), minus two for each bond.
3. Electrons are distributed first to the outer atoms and then to the others, until there are no more to be placed.
4. Finally, each atom (other than hydrogen) that is surrounded by fewer than eight electrons (counting each bond as two) is processed as follows: For every two electrons needed, two dots are deleted from a neighboring atom and an additional line is drawn between the two atoms. This represents the conversion of a lone pair of electrons into a bonding pair, which adds two electrons to the former atom's valence shell while leaving the latter's electron count unchanged.
5. In the preceding steps, if there are not enough electrons to fill the valence shells of all atoms, preference is given to those atoms whose electronegativity is higher.

Lewis structures for polyatomic ions may be drawn by the same method. However, when counting electrons, negative ions should have extra electrons placed in their Lewis structures; positive ions should have fewer electrons than an uncharged molecule. When the Lewis structure of an ion is written, the entire structure is placed in brackets, and the charge is written as a superscript on the upper right, outside the brackets.

=== Miburo method ===
A simpler method has been proposed for constructing Lewis structures, eliminating the need for electron counting: the atoms are drawn showing the valence electrons; bonds are then formed by pairing up valence electrons of the atoms involved in the bond-making process, and anions and cations are formed by adding or removing electrons to/from the appropriate atoms.

A trick is to count up valence electrons, then count up the number of electrons needed to complete the octet rule (or with hydrogen just 2 electrons), then take the difference of these two numbers. The answer is the number of electrons that make up the bonds. The rest of the electrons just go to fill all the other atoms' octets.

=== Lever method ===
Another simple and general procedure to write Lewis structures and resonance forms has been proposed.

This system works in nearly all cases, however there are 3 instances where it will not work. These exceptions are outlined in the table below.

Exceptions
The exception	How it breaks the system	How to fix the Lewis structure
Free radicals (molecules with unpaired valence electrons)	Sum of TVe is an odd number. Bond number is not a whole number.	Round calculated bond number down to the nearest whole number (e.g. 4.5 bonds would round down to 4 bonds).
Valence shell deficiency	Does not break the system, must instead memorize when it occurs.	BeX_{2}, BX_{3}, and AlX_{3}. "X" represents hydrogen or halogens. When Be is bonded with 2 other atoms, or when B and Al are bonded with 3 other atoms, they do not form full valence shells. Assume single bonds and use the actual bond number to calculate lone pairs.
Expanded octet (only occurs for elements in groups 3–8)	Bond calculation provide too few bonds for the number of atoms in the molecule.	Assume single bonds, use the minimal number of bonds necessary to create the molecule.

== Formal charge ==
In terms of Lewis structures, formal charge is used in the description, comparison, and assessment of likely topological and resonance structures by determining the apparent electronic charge of each atom within, based upon its electron dot structure, assuming exclusive covalency or non-polar bonding. It has uses in determining possible electron re-configuration when referring to reaction mechanisms, and often results in the same sign as the partial charge of the atom, with exceptions. In general, the formal charge of an atom can be calculated using the following formula, assuming non-standard definitions for the markup used:
$$C_\text{f} = N_\text{v} - U_\text{e} - \frac{B_\text{n}}{2},$$
where

$C_\text{f}$ is the formal charge,
$N_\text{v}$ represents the number of valence electrons in a free atom of the element,
$U_\text{e}$ represents the number of unshared electrons on the atom,
$B_\text{n}$ represents the total number of electrons in bonds the atom has with another.

The formal charge of an atom is computed as the difference between the number of valence electrons that a neutral atom would have and the number of electrons that belong to it in the Lewis structure. Electrons in covalent bonds are split equally between the atoms involved in the bond. The total of the formal charges on an ion should be equal to the charge on the ion, and the total of the formal charges on a neutral molecule should be equal to zero.

== Resonance ==
For some molecules and ions, it is difficult to determine which lone pairs should be moved to form double or triple bonds, and two or more different resonance structures may be written for the same molecule or ion. In such cases it is usual to write all of them with two-way arrows in between. This is sometimes the case when multiple atoms of the same type surround the central atom, and is especially common for polyatomic ions.

When this situation occurs, the molecule's Lewis structure is said to be a resonance structure, and the molecule exists as a resonance hybrid. Each of the different possibilities is superimposed on the others, and the molecule is considered to have a Lewis structure equivalent to some combination of these states.

The nitrate ion (NO^{−}_{3}), for instance, must form a double bond between nitrogen and one of the oxygens to satisfy the octet rule for nitrogen. However, because the molecule is symmetrical, it does not matter which of the oxygens forms the double bond. In this case, there are three possible resonance structures. Expressing resonance when drawing Lewis structures may be done either by drawing each of the possible resonance forms and placing double-headed arrows between them or by using dashed lines to represent the partial bonds (although the latter is a good representation of the resonance hybrid which is not, formally speaking, a Lewis structure).

When comparing resonance structures for the same molecule, usually those with the fewest formal charges contribute more to the overall resonance hybrid. When formal charges are necessary, resonance structures that have negative charges on the more electronegative elements and positive charges on the less electronegative elements are favored.

Single bonds can also be moved in the same way to create resonance structures for hypervalent molecules such as sulfur hexafluoride, which is the correct description according to quantum chemical calculations instead of the common expanded octet model.

The resonance structure should not be interpreted to indicate that the molecule switches between forms, but that the molecule acts as the average of multiple forms.

== Example ==
The formula of the nitrite ion is NO^{−}_{2}.

1. Nitrogen is the least electronegative atom of the two, so it is the central atom by multiple criteria.
2. Count valence electrons. Nitrogen has 5 valence electrons; each oxygen has 6, for a total of (6 × 2) + 5 = 17. The ion has a charge of −1, which indicates an extra electron, so the total number of electrons is 18.
3. Connect the atoms by single bonds. Each oxygen must be bonded to the nitrogen, which uses four electrons—two in each bond.
4. Place lone pairs. The 14 remaining electrons should initially be placed as 7 lone pairs. Each oxygen may take a maximum of 3 lone pairs, giving each oxygen 8 electrons including the bonding pair. The seventh lone pair must be placed on the nitrogen atom.
5. Satisfy the octet rule. Both oxygen atoms currently have 8 electrons assigned to them. The nitrogen atom has only 6 electrons assigned to it. One of the lone pairs on an oxygen atom must form a double bond, but either atom will work equally well. Therefore, there is a resonance structure.
6. Tie up loose ends. Two Lewis structures must be drawn: Each structure has one of the two oxygen atoms double-bonded to the nitrogen atom. The second oxygen atom in each structure will be single-bonded to the nitrogen atom. Place brackets around each structure, and add the charge (−) to the upper right outside the brackets. Draw a double-headed arrow between the two resonance forms.

== Alternative formations ==
$$\begin{matrix}
\ce{CH3-CH2-CH2-CH3}\\
\ce{CH3CH2CH2CH3}
\end{matrix}$$
Two varieties of condensed structural formula, both showing butane

A skeletal diagram of butane

Chemical structures may be written in more compact forms, particularly when showing organic molecules. In condensed structural formulas, many or even all of the covalent bonds may be left out, with subscripts indicating the number of identical groups attached to a particular atom. Another shorthand structural diagram is the skeletal formula (also known as a bond-line formula or carbon skeleton diagram). In a skeletal formula, carbon atoms are not signified by the symbol C but by the vertices of the lines. Hydrogen atoms bonded to carbon are not shown—they can be inferred by counting the number of bonds to a particular carbon atom—each carbon is assumed to have four bonds in total, so any bonds not shown are, by implication, to hydrogen atoms.

Other diagrams may be more complex than Lewis structures, showing bonds in 3D using various forms such as space-filling diagrams.

== Usage and limitations ==
Despite their simplicity and development in the early twentieth century, when understanding of chemical bonding was still rudimentary, Lewis structures capture many of the key features of the electronic structure of a range of molecular systems, including those of relevance to chemical reactivity. Thus, they continue to enjoy widespread use by chemists and chemistry educators. This is especially true in the field of organic chemistry, where the traditional valence-bond model of bonding still dominates, and mechanisms are often understood in terms of curve-arrow notation superimposed upon skeletal formulae, which are shorthand versions of Lewis structures. Due to the greater variety of bonding schemes encountered in inorganic and organometallic chemistry, many of the molecules encountered require the use of fully delocalized molecular orbitals to adequately describe their bonding, making Lewis structures comparatively less important (although they are still common).

There are simple and archetypal molecular systems for which a Lewis description, at least in unmodified form, is misleading or inaccurate. Notably, the naive drawing of Lewis structures for molecules known experimentally to contain unpaired electrons (e.g., O_{2}, NO, and ClO_{2}) leads to incorrect inferences of bond orders, bond lengths, and/or magnetic properties. A simple Lewis model also does not account for the phenomenon of aromaticity. For instance, Lewis structures do not offer an explanation for why cyclic C_{6}H_{6} (benzene) experiences special stabilization beyond normal delocalization effects, while C_{4}H_{4} (cyclobutadiene) actually experiences a special destabilization. Molecular orbital theory provides the most straightforward explanation for these phenomena.

== See also ==
- Valence shell electron pair repulsion theory
- Molecular geometry
- Structural formula
- Natural bond orbital
