= Chlorine trifluoride =

Chemical compound

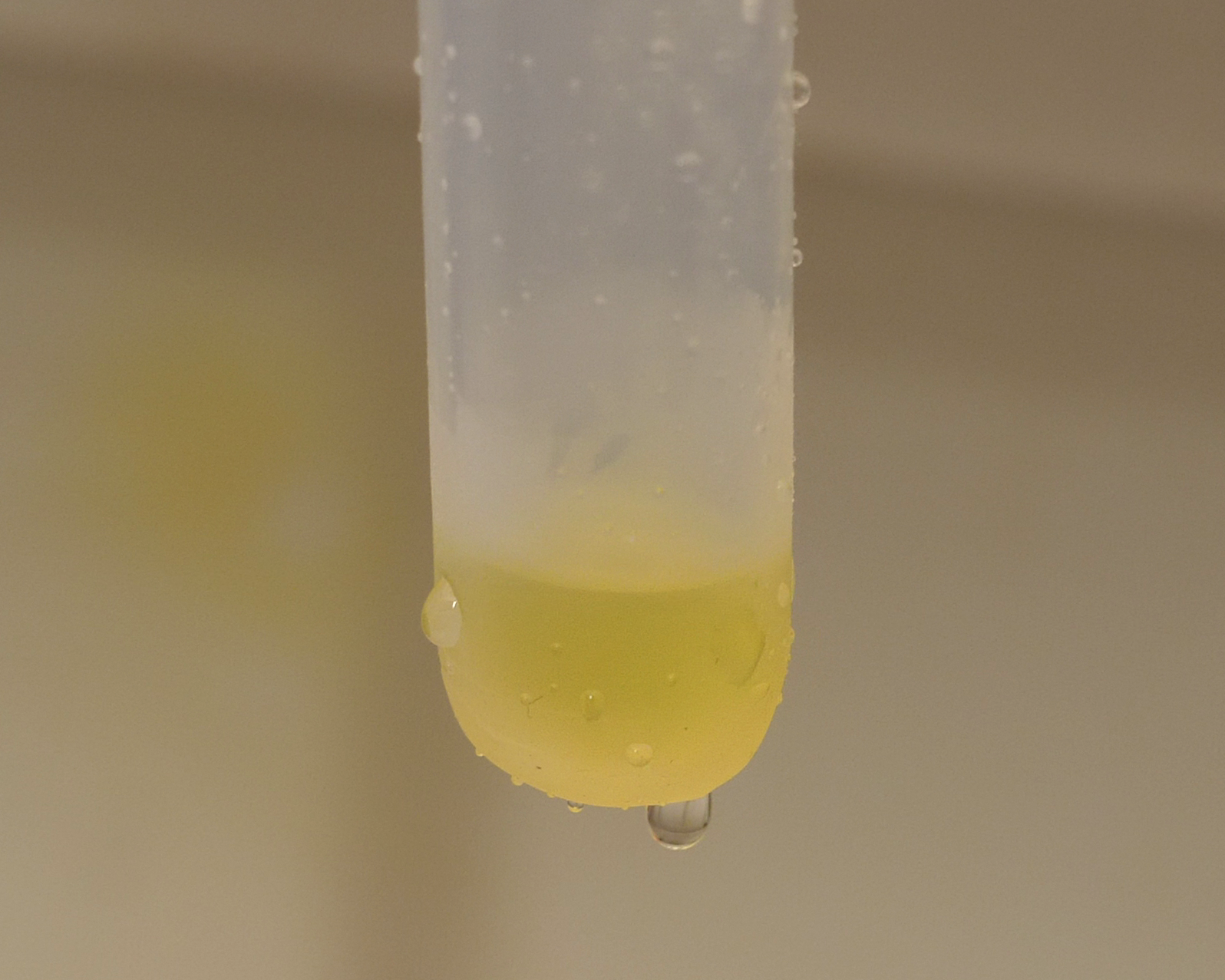
- Liquid chlorine trifluoride discoloured by dissolved chlorine

Skeletal formula of chlorine trifluoride with some measurements
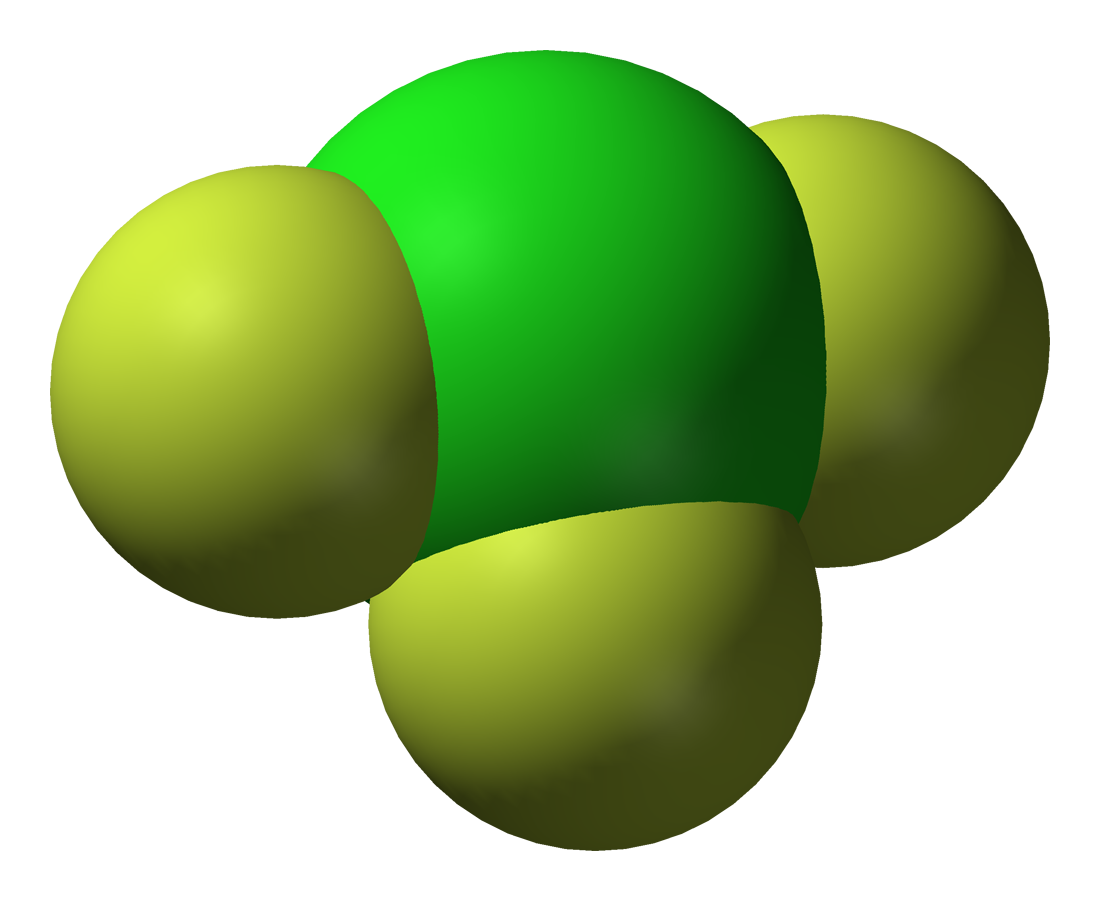
Spacefill model of chlorine trifluoride

Names
- Systematic IUPAC name Trifluoro-λ^{3}-chlorane (substitutive)
- Other names Chlorotrifluoride, CTF

Identifiers
| CAS Number | 7790-91-2 |
| 3D model (JSmol) | Interactive image |
| ChEBI | CHEBI:30123 |
| ChemSpider | 23039 |
| ECHA InfoCard | 100.029.301 |
| EC Number | 232-230-4 |
| Gmelin Reference | 1439 |
| MeSH | chlorine+trifluoride |
| PubChem CID | 24637 |
| RTECS number | FO2800000 |
| UNII | 921841L3N0 |
| UN number | 1749 |
| CompTox Dashboard (EPA) | DTXSID90893948 |
- InChI: InChI=1S/ClF3/c2-1(3)4 Key: JOHWNGGYGAVMGU-UHFFFAOYSA-N; InChI=1/ClF3/c2-1(3)4 Key: JOHWNGGYGAVMGU-UHFFFAOYAB
- SMILES: F[Cl](F)F

Properties
| Chemical formula | ClF_{3} |
| Molar mass | 92.45 g·mol^{−1} |
| Appearance | Colorless gas or greenish-yellow liquid |
| Odor | Sweet, pungent, irritating, suffocating |
| Density | 3.779 g/L |
| Melting point | −76.34 °C (−105.41 °F; 196.81 K) |
| Boiling point | 11.75 °C (53.15 °F; 284.90 K) (decomposes at 180 °C, 356 °F, 453 K) |
| Solubility in water | Reacts with water |
| Solubility | Soluble in carbon tetrachloride but explosive in high concentrations. Reacts with hydrogen-containing compounds e.g. hydrogen, methane, benzene, ether, ammonia. |
| Vapor pressure | 175 kPa |
| Magnetic susceptibility (χ) | −26.5×10^{−6} cm^{3}/mol |
| Viscosity | 91.82 μPa s |

Structure
| Molecular shape | T-shaped molecular geometry |

Thermochemistry
| Heat capacity (C) | 63.9 J K^{−1} mol^{−1} |
| Std molar entropy (S^{⦵}_{298}) | 281.6 J K^{−1} mol^{−1} |
| Std enthalpy of formation (Δ_{f}H^{⦵}_{298}) | −163.2 kJ mol^{−1} |
| Gibbs free energy (Δ_{f}G^{⦵}) | −123.0 kJ mol^{−1} |

Hazards
- Occupational safety and health (OHS/OSH)
| Main hazards | Very toxic, very corrosive, powerful oxidizer, violent hydrolysis |
- GHS labelling
| Pictograms | (GHS03: Oxidizing) (GHS04: Compressed Gas) (GHS05: Corrosive) (GHS06: Toxic) (GHS09: Environmental hazard) |
| Signal word | Danger |
| Hazard statements | H270, H280, H314, H330, H400 |
| Precautionary statements | P220, P244, P260, P264, P271, P273, P280, P284, P301+P330+P331, P302+P361+P354, P304+P340, P305+P354+P338, P316, P320, P321, P363, P370+P376, P391, P403, P403+P233, P405, P410+P403, P501 |
| NFPA 704 (fire diamond) | 4 0 3 W; OX |
| Flash point | Noncombustible |
- Lethal dose or concentration (LD, LC)
| LC_{50} (median concentration) | 95 ppm (rat, 4 hr); 178 ppm (mouse, 1 hr); 230 ppm (monkey, 1 hr); 299 ppm (rat, 1 hr) |
- NIOSH (US health exposure limits)
| PEL (Permissible) | C 0.1 ppm (0.4 mg/m^{3}) |
| REL (Recommended) | C 0.1 ppm (0.4 mg/m^{3}) |
| IDLH (Immediate danger) | 20 ppm |
- Safety data sheet (SDS)

Related compounds
| Related compounds | Chlorine pentafluoride; Chlorine monofluoride; Bromine trifluoride; Iodine trifluoride |
- Except where otherwise noted, data are given for materials in their standard state (at 25 °C [77 °F], 100 kPa). verify (what is ?) Infobox references

Chlorine trifluoride is an interhalogen compound with the formula ClF_{3}. It is a colorless, poisonous, corrosive, and extremely reactive gas that condenses to a pale, greenish-yellow liquid, the form in which it is most often sold (pressurized at room temperature). It is notable for its extreme oxidation properties. The compound is primarily of interest in plasmaless cleaning and etching operations in the semiconductor industry, in nuclear reactor fuel processing, historically as a rocket oxidizer, and various other industrial operations owing to its corrosive nature.

== Preparation, structure, and properties ==
It was first reported in 1930 by German scientists Otto Ruff and Herbert Krug who prepared it by fluorination of chlorine; this also produced chlorine monofluoride (ClF) and the mixture was separated by distillation.

3 F_{2} + Cl_{2} → 2 ClF_{3}

Several hundred tons are produced annually.

The molecular geometry of ClF_{3} is approximately T-shaped, with one short bond (1.598 Å) and two long bonds (1.698 Å). This structure agrees with the prediction of VSEPR theory, which predicts lone pairs of electrons as occupying two equatorial positions of a hypothetic trigonal bipyramid. The elongated Cl-F axial bonds are consistent with hypervalent bonding.

== Reactions ==
ClF_{3} also reacts explosively with water to give hydrogen fluoride and hydrogen chloride, along with oxygen or oxygen difluoride (OF_{2}):

ClF_{3} + 2H_{2}O → 3HF + HCl + O_{2}
ClF_{3} + H_{2}O → HF + HCl + OF_{2}

Upon heating, it decomposes:

ClF_{3} ⇌ ClF + F_{2}

Reactions with many metals and even metal oxides give fluorides:

6NiO + 4 ClF_{3} → 6 NiF_{2} + 3 O_{2} + 2 Cl_{2}
2 AgCl + 2 ClF_{3} → 2 AgF_{2} + 2 ClF + Cl_{2}

ClF_{3} is used to produce uranium hexafluoride:

U + 3 ClF_{3} → UF_{6} + 3 ClF

With phosphorus, it yields phosphorus trichloride (PCl_{3}) and phosphorus pentafluoride (PF_{5}), while sulfur yields sulfur dichloride (SCl_{2}) and sulfur tetrafluoride (SF_{4}).

It reacts with caesium fluoride to give a salt containing the anion F(ClF_{3})^{−}_{3}.

It reacts with inorganic oxides to give salts of chloryl cation ([ClO_{2}]^{+}).

== Uses ==
=== Semiconductor industry ===
In the semiconductor industry, chlorine trifluoride is used to clean CVD chambers. It can be used to remove semiconductor material from the chamber walls without the need to dismantle the chamber. Unlike most of the alternative chemicals used in this role, it does not need to be activated by the use of plasma since the heat of the chamber is sufficient to make it decompose and react with the semiconductor material.

=== Fluorination reagent ===
ClF_{3} is used for the fluorination of a variety of compounds.

=== Military applications ===
Chlorine trifluoride has been investigated as a high-performance storable oxidizer in rocket propellant systems. Handling concerns, however, severely limit its use. The following passage by rocket propellant chemist John D. Clark is widely quoted in descriptions of the substance's extremely hazardous nature:

It is, of course, extremely toxic, but that's the least of the problem. It is hypergolic with every known fuel, and so rapidly hypergolic that no ignition delay has ever been measured. It is also hypergolic with such things as cloth, wood, and test engineers, not to mention asbestos, sand, and water—with which it reacts explosively. It can be kept in some of the ordinary structural metals—steel, copper, aluminum, etc.—because of the formation of a thin film of insoluble metal fluoride that protects the bulk of the metal, just as the invisible coat of oxide on aluminium keeps it from burning up in the atmosphere. If, however, this coat is melted or scrubbed off, and has no chance to reform, the operator is confronted with the problem of coping with a metal-fluorine fire. For dealing with this situation, I have always recommended a good pair of running shoes.

Under the code name N-Stoff ("substance N"), chlorine trifluoride was investigated for military applications by the Kaiser Wilhelm Institute in Nazi Germany not long before the start of World War II. Tests were made against mock-ups of the Maginot Line fortifications, and it was found to be an extremely effective incendiary weapon and poison gas. From 1938, construction commenced on a partly bunkered, partly subterranean 14,000 m^{2} (150,000 sq ft) munitions factory, the Falkenhagen industrial complex, which was intended to produce 90 tonnes of N-Stoff per month, in addition to sarin (a deadly nerve agent). However, by the time it was captured by the advancing Red Army in 1945, the factory had produced only about 30 to 50 tonnes, at a cost of over 100 German Reichsmarks per kilogram. (Note: Using data from Economic History Services and The Inflation Calculator it can be calculated that the sum of 100 Reichsmarks in 1941 is approximately equivalent to US$4,652.50 in 2021. Reichsmark exchange rate values from 1942 to 1944 are fragmentary.) N-Stoff was never used in war.

== Hazards ==
ClF_{3} is a very strong oxidizer. It is extremely reactive with most inorganic and organic materials and will combust many otherwise non-flammable materials without any ignition source. These reactions are often violent and in some cases explosive. Steel, copper, and nickel are not consumed because a passivation layer of metal fluoride will form which prevents further corrosion, but molybdenum, tungsten, and titanium are unsuitable as their fluorides are volatile. ClF_{3} will quickly corrode even noble metals like iridium, platinum, or gold, oxidizing them to chlorides and fluorides.

ClF_{3} causes severe chemical and thermal burns. The products of hydrolysis are mainly hydrofluoric acid and hydrochloric acid, which are usually released as steam or vapor due to the highly exothermic nature of the reaction, and these substances present hazards of their own.

This oxidizing power, surpassing that of oxygen, causes ClF_{3} to react vigorously with many other materials often thought of as incombustible and refractory. It ignites sand, asbestos, glass, and even ashes of substances that have already burned in oxygen. In one particular industrial accident, a spill of 900 kg of ClF_{3} burned through 30 cm of concrete and 90 cm of gravel beneath. In general, ClF_{3} fires "cannot be extinguished efficiently, if at all," with safety protocols generally calling for careful facility design so that if a fire occurs it can be allowed to burn and the area flooded to reduce more widespread damage.

== See also ==
- Chlorine fluoride
- Dioxygen difluoride
- List of stoffs
