= Herbert Marcus Powell =

British chemist

Herbert Marcus Powell FRS (7 August 1906 – 10 March 1991) was a British chemist and professor at the University of Oxford.

Powell presented the idea of a correlation between molecular geometry and number of valence electron pairs in a Bakerian Lecture in 1940 with Nevil Sidgwick on University of Oxford.

He studied chemistry at St John's College, Oxford, graduating with First Class honours in 1928, then continued to work in the Chemistry department in Oxford throughout his career. Powell supervised some of Dorothy Crowfoot's undergraduate training in crystallography. In 1964 he became the first (and only) Professor of Chemical Crystallography, retiring from the university in 1974. He was not a fellow of any college until his 1963 appointment to Hertford College.

He coined the term clathrates for inclusion compounds.
