= Lone pair =

Pair of valence electrons which are not shared with another atom in a covalent bond

Lone pairs (shown as pairs of dots) in the Lewis structure of hydroxide

In chemistry, a lone pair refers to a pair of valence electrons that are not shared with another atom in a covalent bond and is sometimes called an unshared pair or non-bonding pair. Lone pairs are found in the outermost electron shell of atoms. They can be identified by using a Lewis structure. Electron pairs are therefore considered lone pairs if two electrons are paired but are not used in chemical bonding. Thus, the number of electrons in lone pairs plus the number of electrons in bonds equals the number of valence electrons around an atom.

Lone pair is a concept used in valence shell electron pair repulsion theory (VSEPR theory) which explains the shapes of molecules. They are also referred to in the chemistry of Lewis acids and bases. However, not all non-bonding pairs of electrons are considered by chemists to be lone pairs. Examples are the transition metals where the non-bonding pairs do not influence molecular geometry and are said to be stereochemically inactive. In molecular orbital theory (fully delocalized canonical orbitals or localized in some form), the concept of a lone pair is less distinct, as the correspondence between an orbital and components of a Lewis structure is often not straightforward. Nevertheless, occupied non-bonding orbitals (or orbitals of mostly nonbonding character) are frequently identified as lone pairs.

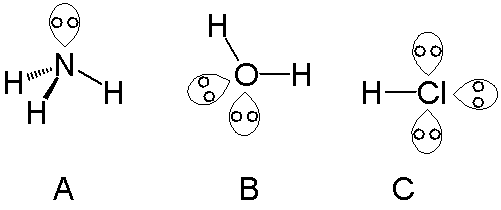
Lone pairs in ammonia (A), water (B), and hydrogen chloride (C)

A single lone pair can be found with atoms in the nitrogen group, such as nitrogen in ammonia. Two lone pairs can be found with atoms in the chalcogen group, such as oxygen in water. The halogens can carry three lone pairs, such as in hydrogen chloride.

In VSEPR theory the electron pairs on the oxygen atom in water form the vertices of a tetrahedron with the lone pairs on two of the four vertices. The H–O–H bond angle is 104.5°, less than the 109° predicted for a tetrahedral angle, and this can be explained by a repulsive interaction between the lone pairs.

Various computational criteria for the presence of lone pairs have been proposed. While electron density ρ(r) itself generally does not provide useful guidance in this regard, the Laplacian of the electron density is revealing, and one criterion for the location of the lone pair is where L(r) = –∇^{2}ρ(r) is a local maximum. The minima of the electrostatic potential V(r) is another proposed criterion. Yet another considers the electron localization function (ELF).

== Angle changes ==
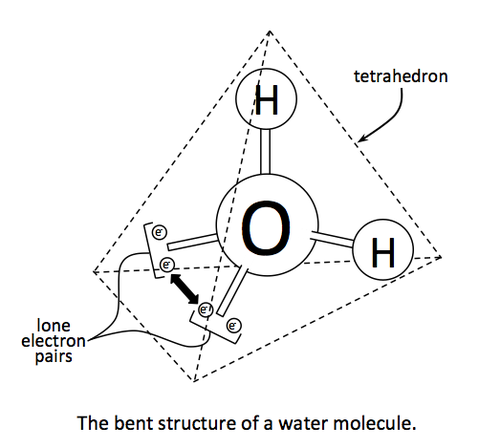
Tetrahedral structure of water

The pairs often exhibit a negative polar character with their high charge density and are located closer to the atomic nucleus on average compared to the bonding pair of electrons. The presence of a lone pair decreases the bond angle between the bonding pair of electrons, due to their high electric charge, which causes great repulsion between the electrons. They are also involved in the formation of a dative bond. For example, the creation of the hydronium (H_{3}O^{+}) ion occurs when acids are dissolved in water and is due to the oxygen atom donating a lone pair to the hydrogen ion.

This can be seen more clearly when looked at it in two more common molecules. For example, in carbon dioxide (CO_{2}), which does not have a lone pair, the oxygen atoms are on opposite sides of the carbon atom (linear molecular geometry), whereas in water (H_{2}O) which has two lone pairs, the angle between the hydrogen atoms is 104.5° (bent molecular geometry). This is caused by the repulsive force of the oxygen atom's two lone pairs pushing the hydrogen atoms further apart, until the forces of all electrons on the hydrogen atom are in equilibrium. This is an illustration of the VSEPR theory.

== Dipole moments ==
Lone pairs can contribute to a molecule's dipole moment. NH_{3} has a dipole moment of 1.42 D. As the electronegativity of nitrogen (3.04) is greater than that of hydrogen (2.2) the result is that the N-H bonds are polar with a net negative charge on the nitrogen atom and a smaller net positive charge on the hydrogen atoms. There is also a dipole associated with the lone pair and this reinforces the contribution made by the polar covalent N-H bonds to ammonia's dipole moment. In contrast to NH_{3}, NF_{3} has a much lower dipole moment of 0.234 D. Fluorine is more electronegative than nitrogen and the polarity of the N-F bonds is opposite to that of the N-H bonds in ammonia, so that the dipole due to the lone pair opposes the N-F bond dipoles, resulting in a low molecular dipole moment.

== Stereogenic lone pairs ==
⇌
Inversion of a generic organic amine molecule at nitrogen

A lone pair can contribute to the existence of chirality in a molecule, when three other groups attached to an atom all differ. The effect is seen in certain amines, phosphines, sulfonium and oxonium ions, sulfoxides, and even carbanions.

The resolution of enantiomers where the stereogenic center is an amine is usually precluded because the energy barrier for nitrogen inversion at the stereo center is low, which allow the two stereoisomers to rapidly interconvert at room temperature. As a result, such chiral amines cannot be resolved, unless the amine's groups are constrained in a cyclic structure (such as in Tröger's base).

== Unusual lone pairs ==
A stereochemically active lone pair is also expected for divalent lead and tin ions due to their formal electronic configuration of ns^{2}. In the solid state this results in the distorted metal coordination observed in the tetragonal litharge structure adopted by both PbO and SnO. The formation of these heavy metal ns^{2} lone pairs which was previously attributed to intra-atomic hybridization of the metal s and p states has recently been shown to have a strong anion dependence. This dependence on the electronic states of the anion can explain why some divalent lead and tin materials such as PbS and SnTe show no stereochemical evidence of the lone pair and adopt the symmetric rocksalt crystal structure.

In molecular systems the lone pair can also result in a distortion in the coordination of ligands around the metal ion. The lone-pair effect of lead can be observed in supramolecular complexes of lead(II) nitrate, and in 2007 a study linked the lone pair to lead poisoning. Lead ions can replace the native metal ions in several key enzymes, such as zinc cations in the ALAD enzyme, which is also known as porphobilinogen synthase, and is important in the synthesis of heme, a key component of the oxygen-carrying molecule hemoglobin. This inhibition of heme synthesis appears to be the molecular basis of lead poisoning (also called "saturnism" or "plumbism").

Computational experiments reveal that although the coordination number does not change upon substitution in calcium-binding proteins, the introduction of lead distorts the way the ligands organize themselves to accommodate such an emerging lone pair; consequently, these proteins are perturbed. This lone-pair effect becomes dramatic for zinc-binding proteins, such as the above-mentioned porphobilinogen synthase, as the natural substrate cannot bind anymore – in those cases the protein is inhibited.

In Group 14 elements (the carbon group), lone pairs can manifest themselves by shortening or lengthening single bond (bond order 1) lengths, as well as in the effective order of triple bonds as well. The familiar alkynes have a carbon-carbon triple bond (bond order 3) and a linear geometry of 180° bond angles (figure A in reference). However, further down in the group (silicon, germanium, and tin), formal triple bonds have an effective bond order 2 with one lone pair (figure B) and trans-bent geometries. In lead, the effective bond order is reduced even further to a single bond, with two lone pairs for each lead atom (figure C). In the organogermanium compound (Scheme 1 in the reference), the effective bond order is also 1, with complexation of the acidic isonitrile (or isocyanide) C-N groups, based on interaction with germanium's empty 4p orbital.

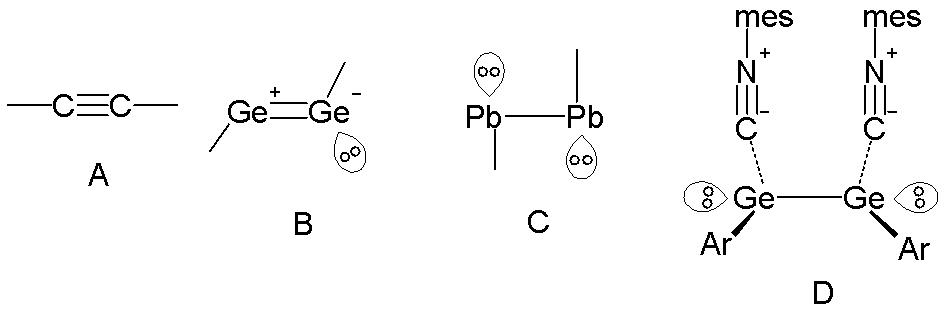
Lone pair trends in group 14 triple bonds

== Different descriptions for multiple lone pairs ==
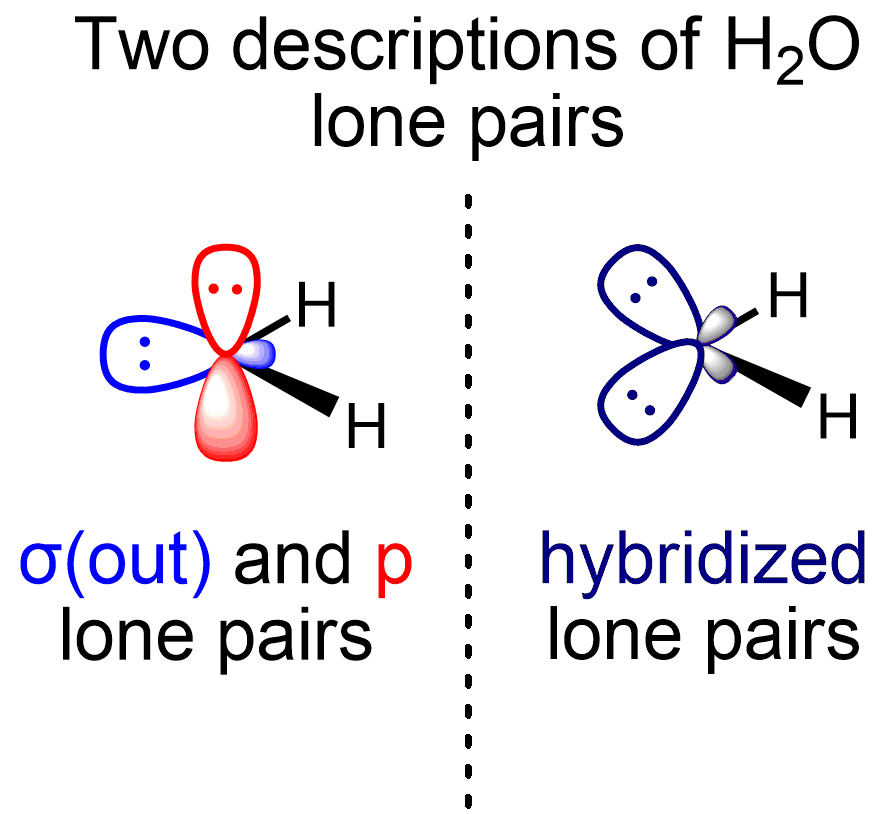
The symmetry-adapted and hybridized lone pairs of H_{2}O

In elementary chemistry courses, the lone pairs of water are sometimes described as "rabbit ears": two equivalent electron pairs of approximately sp^{3} hybridization, while the HOH bond angle is 104.5°, slightly smaller than the ideal tetrahedral angle of arccos(–1/3) ≈ 109.47°. The smaller bond angle is rationalized by VSEPR theory by ascribing a larger space requirement for the two identical lone pairs compared to the two bonding pairs. In more advanced courses, an alternative explanation for this phenomenon considers the greater stability of orbitals with excess s character using the theory of isovalent hybridization, in which bonds and lone pairs can be constructed with sp^{x} hybrids wherein nonintegral values of x are allowed, so long as the total amount of s and p character is conserved (one s and three p orbitals in the case of second-row p-block elements).

To determine the hybridization of oxygen orbitals used to form the bonding pairs and lone pairs of water in this picture, we use the formula 1 + x cos θ = 0, which relates bond angle θ with the hybridization index x. According to this formula, the O–H bonds are considered to be constructed from O bonding orbitals of ~sp^{4.0} hybridization (~80% p character, ~20% s character), which leaves behind O lone pairs orbitals of ~sp^{2.3} hybridization (~70% p character, ~30% s character). These deviations from idealized sp^{3} hybridization (75% p character, 25% s character) for tetrahedral geometry are consistent with Bent's rule: lone pairs localize more electron density closer to the central atom compared to bonding pairs; hence, the use of orbitals with excess s character to form lone pairs (and, consequently, those with excess p character to form bonding pairs) is energetically favorable.

However, theoreticians often prefer an alternative description of water that separates the lone pairs of water according to symmetry with respect to the molecular plane. In this model, there are two energetically and geometrically distinct lone pairs of water possessing different symmetry: one (σ) in-plane and symmetric with respect to the molecular plane and the other (π) perpendicular and anti-symmetric with respect to the molecular plane. The σ-symmetry lone pair (σ(out)) is formed from a hybrid orbital that mixes 2s and 2p character, while the π-symmetry lone pair (p) is of exclusive 2p orbital parentage. The s character rich O σ(out) lone pair orbital (also notated n_{O}^{(σ)}) is an ~sp^{0.7} hybrid (~40% p character, 60% s character), while the p lone pair orbital (also notated n_{O}^{(π)}) consists of 100% p character.

Both models are of value and represent the same total electron density, with the orbitals related by a unitary transformation. In this case, we can construct the two equivalent lone pair hybrid orbitals h and h' by taking linear combinations h = c_{1}σ(out) + c_{2}p and h' = c_{1}σ(out) – c_{2}p for an appropriate choice of coefficients c_{1} and c_{2}. For chemical and physical properties of water that depend on the overall electron distribution of the molecule, the use of h and h' is just as valid as the use of σ(out) and p. In some cases, such a view is intuitively useful. For example, the stereoelectronic requirement for the anomeric effect can be rationalized using equivalent lone pairs, since it is the overall donation of electron density into the antibonding orbital that matters. An alternative treatment using σ/π separated lone pairs is also valid, but it requires striking a balance between maximizing n_{O}^{(π)}-σ* overlap (maximum at 90° dihedral angle) and n_{O}^{(σ)}-σ* overlap (maximum at 0° dihedral angle), a compromise that leads to the conclusion that a gauche conformation (60° dihedral angle) is most favorable, the same conclusion that the equivalent lone pairs model rationalizes in a much more straightforward manner. Similarly, the hydrogen bonds of water form along the directions of the "rabbit ears" lone pairs, as a reflection of the increased availability of electrons in these regions. This view is supported computationally. However, because only the symmetry-adapted canonical orbitals have physically meaningful energies, phenomena that have to do with the energies of individual orbitals, such as photochemical reactivity or photoelectron spectroscopy, are most readily explained using σ and π lone pairs that respect the molecular symmetry.

Because of the popularity of VSEPR theory, the treatment of the water lone pairs as equivalent is prevalent in introductory chemistry courses, and many practicing chemists continue to regard it as a useful model. A similar situation arises when describing the two lone pairs on the carbonyl oxygen atom of a ketone. However, the question of whether it is conceptually useful to derive equivalent orbitals from symmetry-adapted ones, from the standpoint of bonding theory and pedagogy, is still a controversial one, with recent (2014 and 2015) articles opposing and supporting the practice.

== See also ==
- Coordination complex
- HOMO and LUMO (highest occupied molecular orbital and lowest unoccupied molecular orbital)
- Inert-pair effect
- Ligand
- Shared pair
