= T-shaped molecular geometry =

Type of molecular geometry

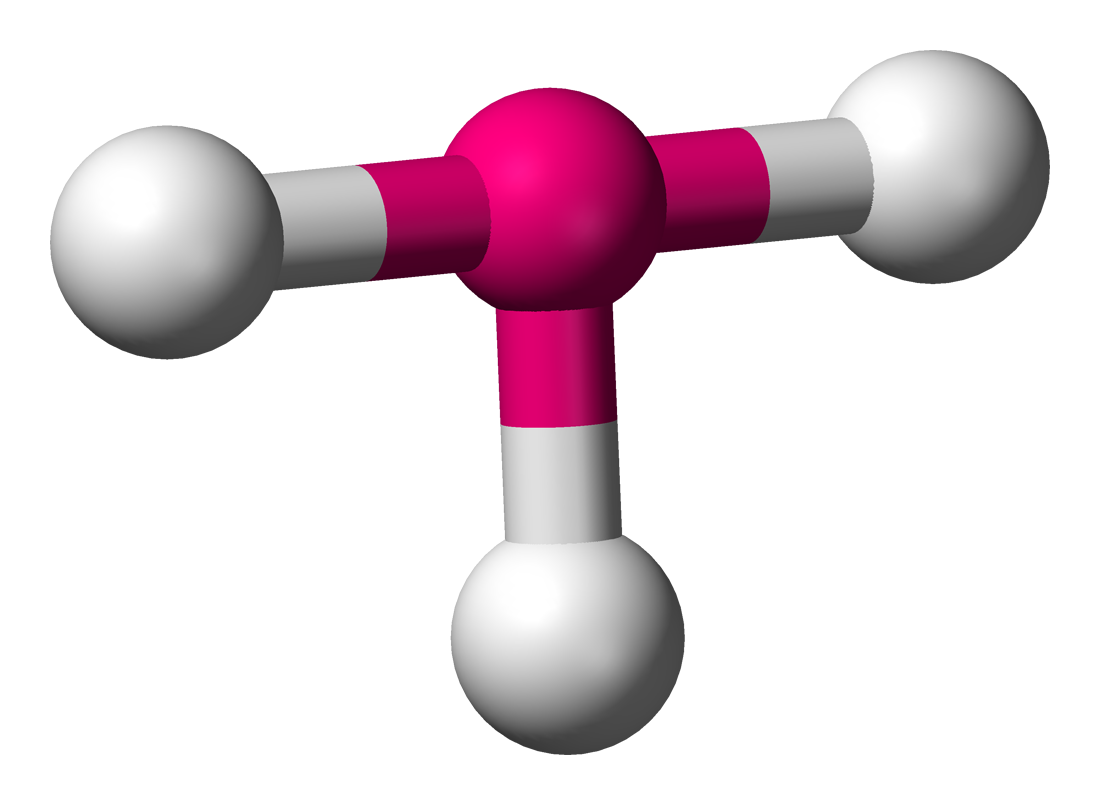
- Examples: ClF_{3}
- Point group: C_{2v}
- Coordination number: 3
- Bond angle(s): 90° and 180°
- μ (Polarity): >0

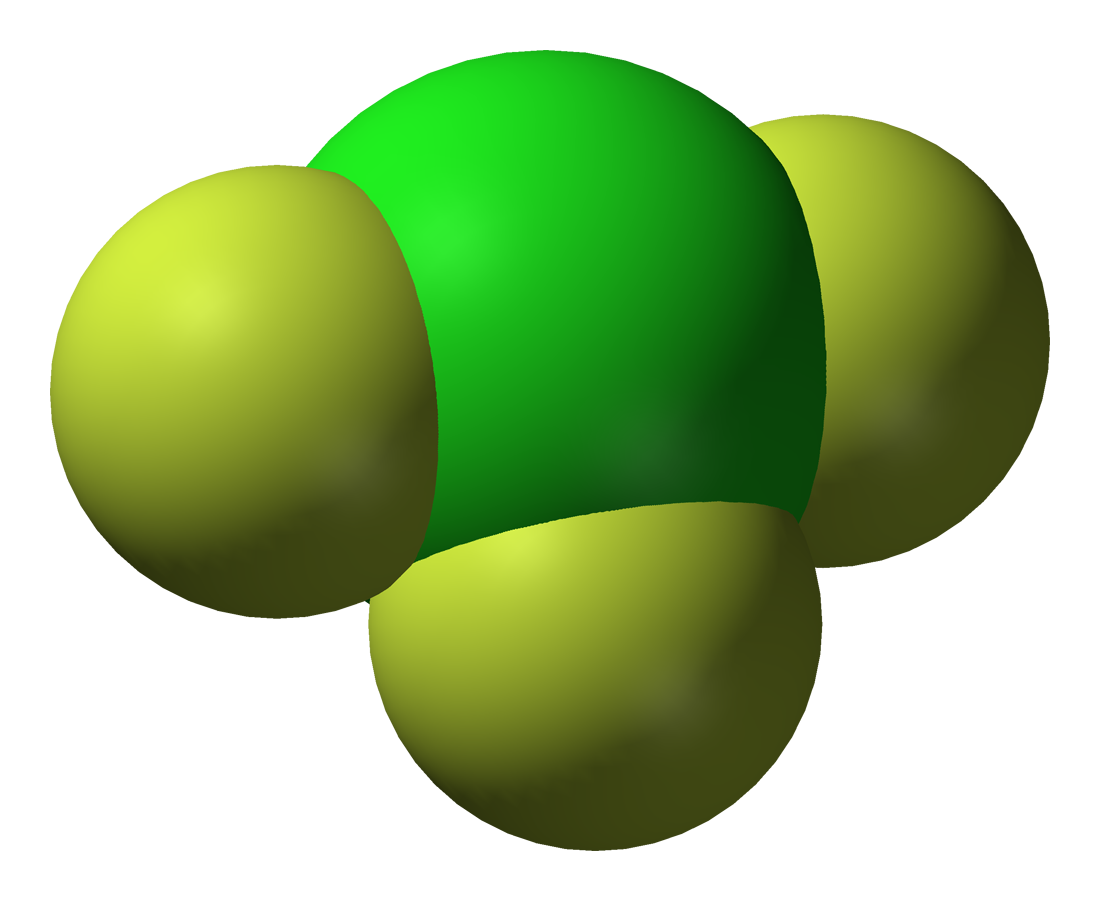
Structure of chlorine trifluoride, an example of a compound with T-shaped coordination geometry.

In chemistry, T-shaped molecular geometry describes the structures of some molecules where a central atom has three ligands. Ordinarily, three-coordinated compounds adopt trigonal planar or pyramidal geometries. Examples of T-shaped molecules are the halogen trifluorides, such as ClF_{3}.

According to VSEPR theory, T-shaped geometry results when three ligands and two lone pairs of electrons are bonded to the central atom, written in AXE notation as AX_{3}E_{2}. The T-shaped geometry is related to the trigonal bipyramidal molecular geometry for AX_{5} molecules with three equatorial and two axial ligands. In an AX_{3}E_{2} molecule, the two lone pairs occupy two equatorial positions, and the three ligand atoms occupy the two axial positions as well as one equatorial position. The three atoms bond at 90° angles on one side of the central atom, producing the T shape.

The trifluoroxenate(II) anion, XeF^{−}_{3}, has been investigated as a possible first example of an AX_{3}E_{3} molecule, which might be expected by VSEPR reasoning to have six electron pairs in an octahedral arrangement with both the three lone pairs and the three ligands in a mer or T-shaped orientations. Although this anion has been detected in the gas phase, attempts at synthesis in solution and experimental structure determination were unsuccessful. A computational chemistry study showed a distorted planar Y-shaped geometry with the smallest F–Xe–F bond angle equal to 69°, rather than 90° as in a T-shaped geometry.

== See also ==
- AXE method
