= Linear molecular geometry =

3D shape of molecules in which all bond angles are 180°

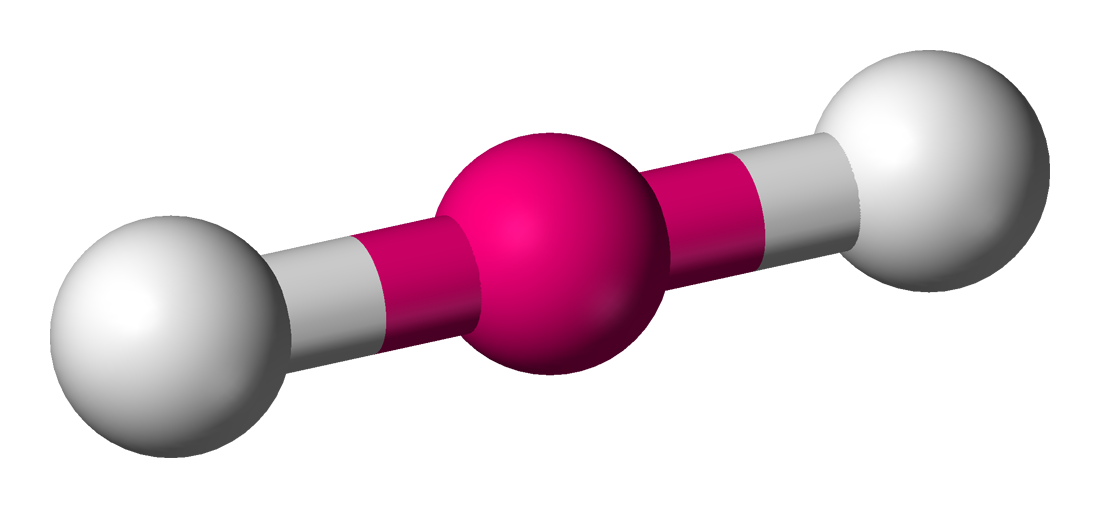
- Examples: Carbon dioxide CO_{2} Xenon difluoride XeF_{2}
- Point group: D_{∞h}
- Coordination number: 2
- Bond angle(s): 180°
- μ (Polarity): 0

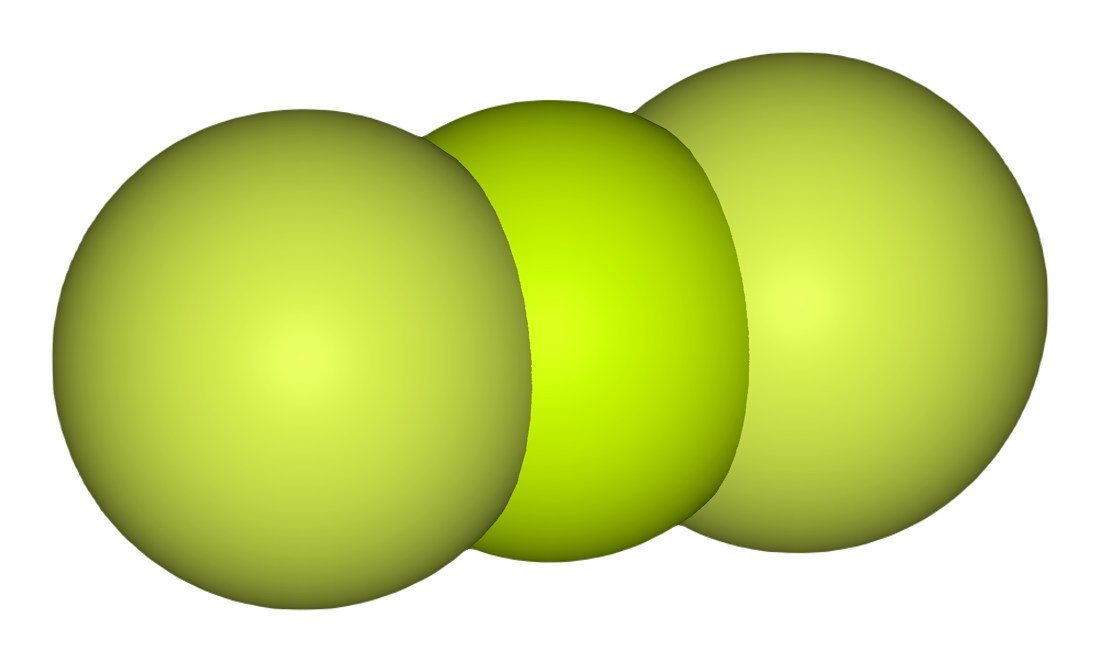
Structure of beryllium fluoride (BeF_{2}), a compound with a linear geometry at the beryllium atom.

The linear molecular geometry describes the geometry around a central atom bonded to two other atoms (or ligands) placed at a bond angle of 180°. Linear organic molecules, such as acetylene (HC≡CH), are often described by invoking sp orbital hybridization for their carbon centers.

Two sp orbitals

According to the VSEPR model (Valence Shell Electron Pair Repulsion model), linear geometry occurs at central atoms with two bonded atoms and zero or three lone pairs (AX_{2} or AX_{2}E_{3}) in the AXE notation. Neutral AX_{2} molecules with linear geometry include beryllium fluoride (F−Be−F) with two single bonds, carbon dioxide (O=C=O) with two double bonds, hydrogen cyanide (H−C≡N) with one single and one triple bond. The most important linear molecule with more than three atoms is acetylene (H−C≡C−H), in which each of its carbon atoms is considered to be a central atom with a single bond to one hydrogen and a triple bond to the other carbon atom. Linear anions include azide (N^{−}=N^{+}=N^{−}) and thiocyanate (S=C=N^{−}), and a linear cation is the nitronium ion (O=N^{+}=O).

Linear geometry also occurs in AX_{2}E_{3} molecules, such as xenon difluoride (XeF_{2}) and the triiodide ion (I^{−}_{3}) with one iodide bonded to the two others. As described by the VSEPR model, the five valence electron pairs on the central atom form a trigonal bipyramid in which the three lone pairs occupy the less crowded equatorial positions and the two bonded atoms occupy the two axial positions at the opposite ends of an axis, forming a linear molecule.

Linear molecules have two degrees of rotational freedom.

== See also ==
- AXE method
- Molecular geometry
