= Bent molecular geometry =

Molecular geometry

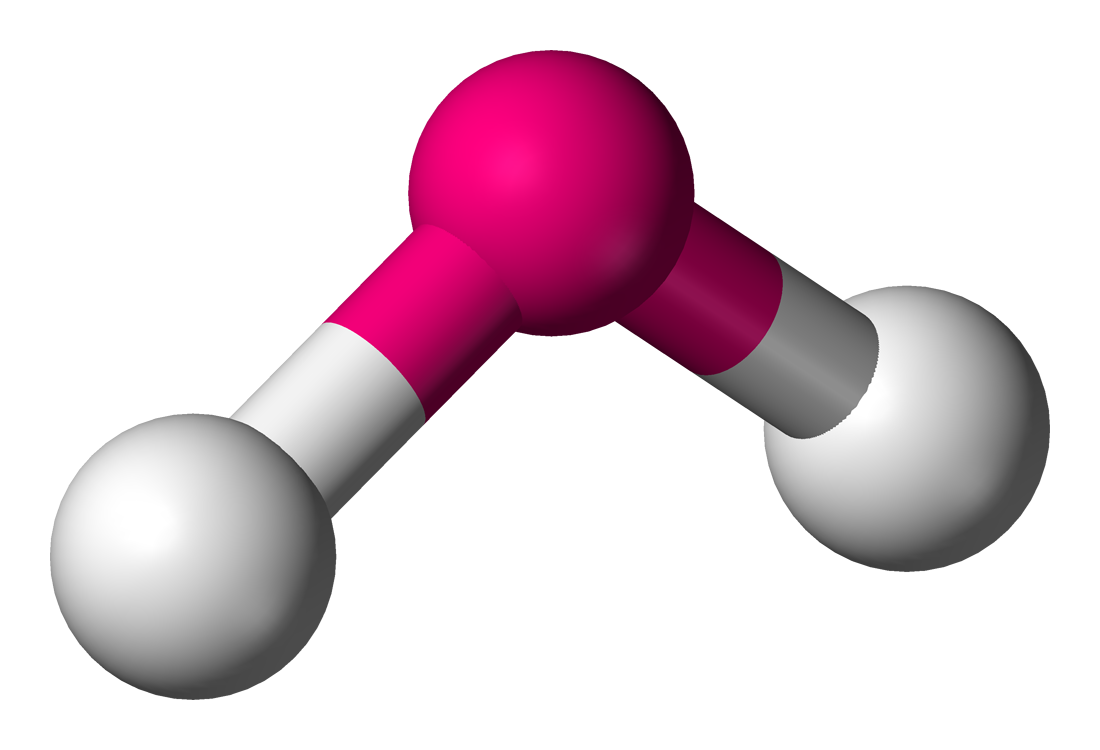
- Examples: H_{2}O, SO_{2}
- Point group: C_{2v}
- Coordination number: 2
- Bond angle(s): 90° to 120°
- μ (Polarity): >0

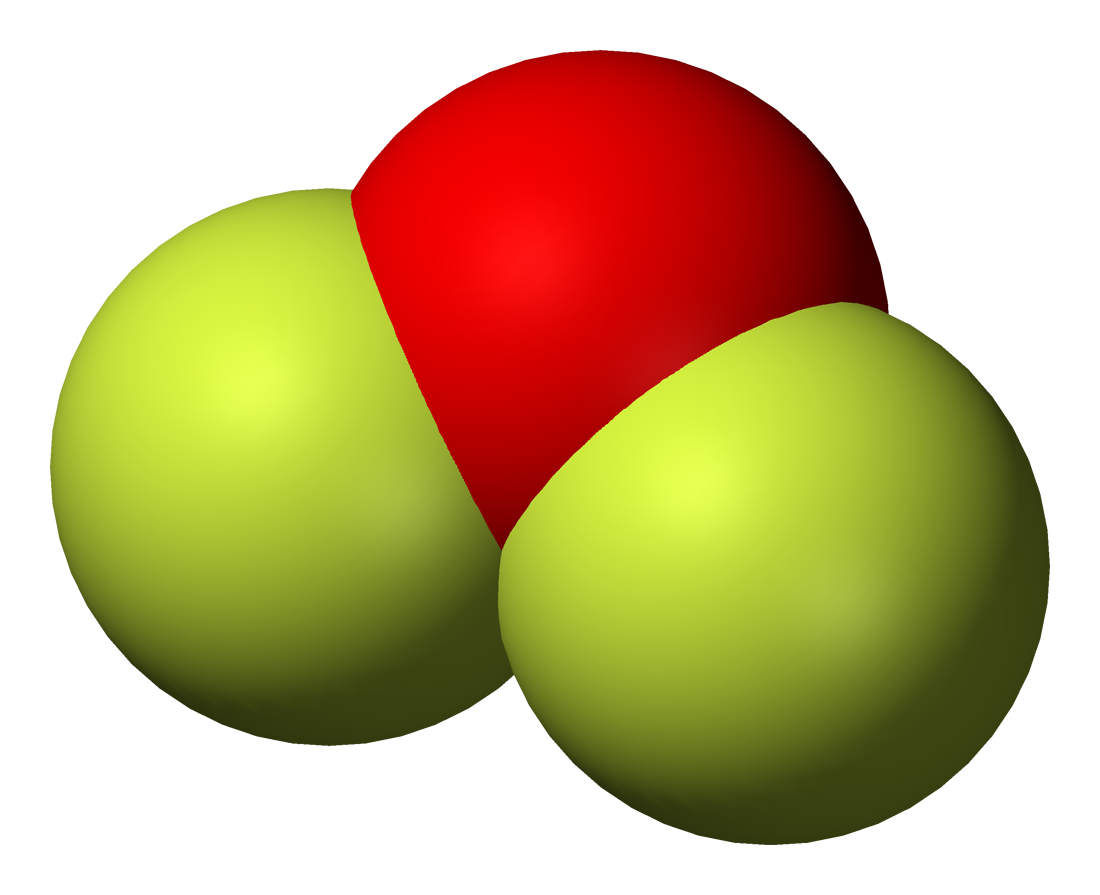
Oxygen difluoride, an example of a molecule with the bent coordination geometry.

In chemistry, molecules with a non-collinear arrangement of two adjacent bonds have bent molecular geometry, also known as angular or V-shaped. Certain atoms, such as oxygen, will almost always set their two (or more) covalent bonds in non-collinear directions due to their electron configuration. Water (H_{2}O) is an example of a bent molecule, as well as its analogues. The bond angle between the two hydrogen atoms is approximately 104.45°. Nonlinear geometry is commonly observed for other triatomic molecules and ions containing only main group elements, prominent examples being nitrogen dioxide (NO_{2}), sulfur dichloride (SCl_{2}), and methylene (CH_{2}).

This geometry is almost always consistent with VSEPR theory, which usually explains non-collinearity of atoms with a presence of lone pairs. There are several variants of bending, where the most common is AX_{2}E_{2} where two covalent bonds and two lone pairs of the central atom (A) form a complete 8-electron shell. They have central angles from 104° to 109.5°, where the latter is consistent with a simplistic theory which predicts the tetrahedral symmetry of four sp^{3} hybridised orbitals. The most common actual angles are 105°, 107°, and 109°: they vary because of the different properties of the peripheral atoms (X).

Other cases also experience orbital hybridisation, but in different degrees. AX_{2}E_{1} molecules, such as SnCl_{2}, have only one lone pair and the central angle about 120° (the centre and two vertices of an equilateral triangle). They have three sp^{2} orbitals. There exist also sd-hybridised AX_{2} compounds of transition metals without lone pairs: they have the central angle about 90° and are also classified as bent.

== See also ==
- AXE method
