= Trigonal pyramidal molecular geometry =

Configuration of atoms within a molecule

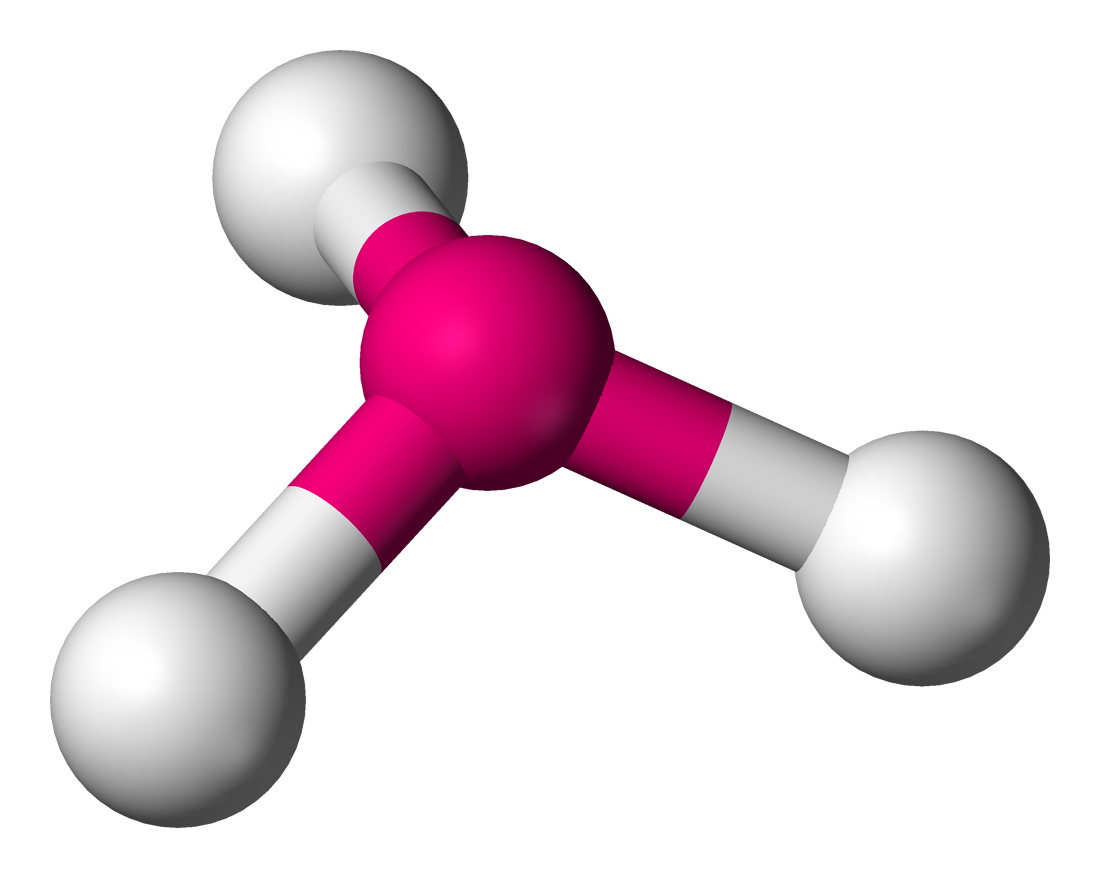
- Examples: NH_{3}
- Point group: C_{3v}
- Coordination number: 3
- Bond angle(s): 90° to 109.5°
- μ (Polarity): >0

In chemistry, a trigonal pyramid is a molecular geometry with one atom at the apex and three atoms at the corners of a trigonal base. When all three atoms at the corners are identical, the molecular symmetry is C_{3v}. In the AXE method of VSEPR theory this geometry is classified as AX_{3}E_{1}.

== Selected inorganic cases ==
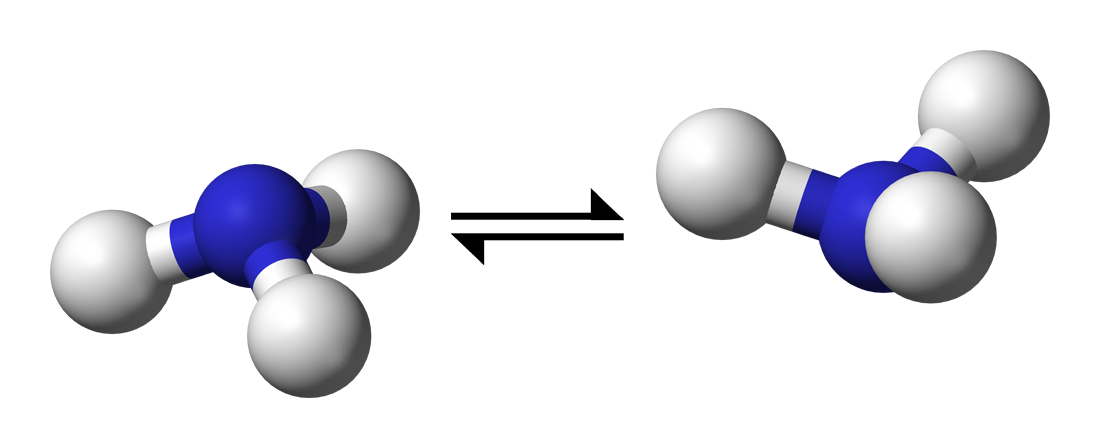
Inversion of ammonia

With three hydrogen ligands and a nonbonded pair of valence electrons, ammonia is a prototypical trigonal pyramid. The molecule undergoes rapid intramolecular inversion. More so than ammonia, phosphine (PH_{3}) is highly pyramidal, with H-P-H angles near 93°. Inorganic compounds related to ammonia and phosphine are numerous, common examples are chloramines and phosphorus trichloride.

xenon trioxide (XeO_{3}), the chlorate ion, ClO^{−}_{3}, and the sulfite ion, SO_{3}^{^{−}_{2}}, are examples of pyramidal inorganic species with multiple bonds.

== Selected organic cases ==
In organic chemistry, atoms at the center of a trigonal pyramid are sometimes described as being sp^{3} hybridized. For example, amines (like ammonia) feature pyramidal nitrogen centers. Nitrogen in such cases is described as being sp^{3} hybridized.

Amides (RC(O)NR'_{2}) almost always feature trigonal planar nitrogen. Distortions from that geometry, which have been parameterized, relate to the hydrolytic stability of the amide (RC(O)-NR'_{2}). The significance of this pyramidalization is shown by the mode of action of the penicillins.

Phosphines, with the formula PR_{3}, are pyramidal but less so than phosphine (PH_{3}) itself. Unlike ammonia and amines, phosphines do not readily invert, i.e. pyramidal inversion is subject to a high barrier. One consequence of their rigidity is that chiral phosphines are optically stable.

Examples of pyramidal organic compounds with multiple bonds are sulfoxides.

== Radicals ==
Although they are often invoked, radicals with the formula ·AX_{3} can adopt pyramidal structures. The methyl radical (·CH_{3}) is flexible but trigonal planar, but trifluoromethyl radical is pyramidal.

== See also ==
- VSEPR theory#AXE method
- Molecular geometry
