= Chlorine monofluoride =

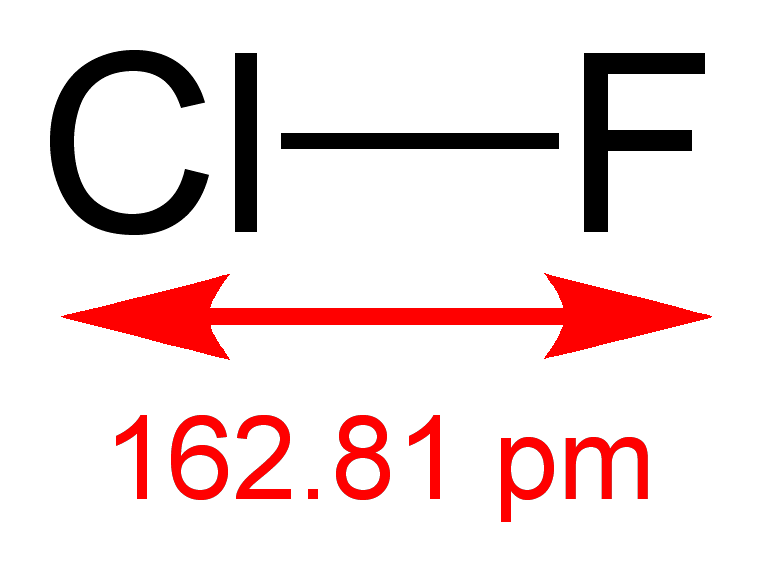

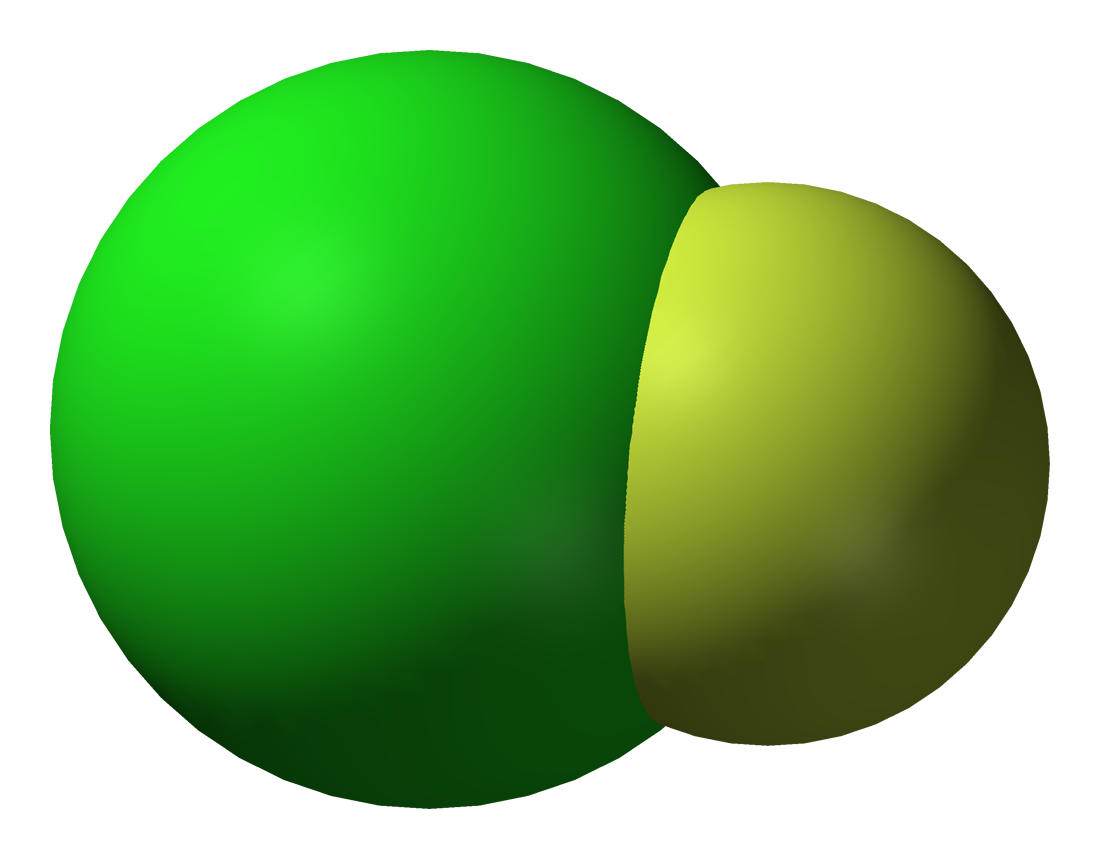

Names
- IUPAC name Chlorine monofluoride
- Other names Chlorine fluoride

Identifiers
CAS Number	7790-89-8
3D model (JSmol)	Interactive image
ChemSpider	109879
ECHA InfoCard	100.029.300
PubChem CID	123266
UNII	UE4699O6C6
CompTox Dashboard (EPA)	DTXSID50894057
- InChI: InChI=1S/FCl/c1-2 Key: OMRRUNXAWXNVFW-UHFFFAOYSA-N; InChI=1/FCl/c1-2 Key: OMRRUNXAWXNVFW-UHFFFAOYAD
- SMILES: FCl

Properties
Chemical formula	ClF
Molar mass	54.45 g·mol^{−1}
Appearance	Colorless gas (slightly yellow when liquid)
Density	1.62 g/mL (liquid, −100 °C)
Melting point	−155.6 °C (−248.1 °F; 117.5 K)
Boiling point	−100.1 °C (−148.2 °F; 173.1 K)
Solubility in water	reacts violently

Structure
Dipole moment	0.881 D (2.94 × 10^{−30} C m)

Thermochemistry
Heat capacity (C)	33.01 J/(mol·K)
Std molar entropy (S^{⦵}_{298})	217.91 J/(mol·K)
Std enthalpy of formation (Δ_{f}H^{⦵}_{298})	−56.5 kJ/mol

Hazards
- Occupational safety and health (OHS/OSH)
Main hazards	Toxic, strong oxidizer; releases HF on contact with water
- GHS labelling
Pictograms	(GHS03: Oxidizing) (GHS05: Corrosive) (GHS06: Toxic)
Signal word	Danger
Hazard statements	H270, H314, H330
NFPA 704 (fire diamond)	4 0 3 W; OX

Related compounds
Related compounds	Chlorine trifluoride; Chlorine pentafluoride; Bromine monofluoride; Iodine monofluoride; Bromine monochloride; Iodine monochloride; Iodine monobromide; Astatine monofluoride; Astatine monochloride; Astatine monobromide; Astatine monoiodide
- Except where otherwise noted, data are given for materials in their standard state (at 25 °C [77 °F], 100 kPa). verify (what is ?) Infobox references

Chlorine monofluoride is a volatile interhalogen compound with the chemical formula ClF. It is a colourless gas at room temperature and is stable even at high temperatures. When cooled to −100 °C, ClF condenses as a pale yellow liquid. Many of its properties are intermediate between its parent halogens, Cl_{2} and F_{2}.

== Geometry ==
The molecular structure in the gas phase was determined by microwave spectroscopy; the bond length is r_{e} = 1.628341(4) Å.

The bond length in the crystalline ClF is 1.628(1) Å; the lengthening relative to the free molecule is due to an interaction of the type F-Br···ClMe with a distance of 2.640(1) Å. In its molecular packing it shows very short intermolecular Cl···Cl contacts of 3.070(1) Å between neighboring molecules.

== Reactivity ==
Chlorine monofluoride is a versatile fluorinating agent, converting metals and non-metals to their fluorides and releasing Cl_{2} in the process. For example, it converts tungsten to tungsten hexafluoride and selenium to selenium tetrafluoride:

W + 6 ClF → WF_{6} + 3 Cl_{2}
Se + 4 ClF → SeF_{4} + 2 Cl_{2}

FCl can also chlorofluorinate compounds, either by addition across a multiple bond or via oxidation. For example, it adds fluorine and chlorine to the carbon of carbon monoxide, yielding carbonyl chloride fluoride COClF, an intermediate between phosgene and carbonyl fluoride.

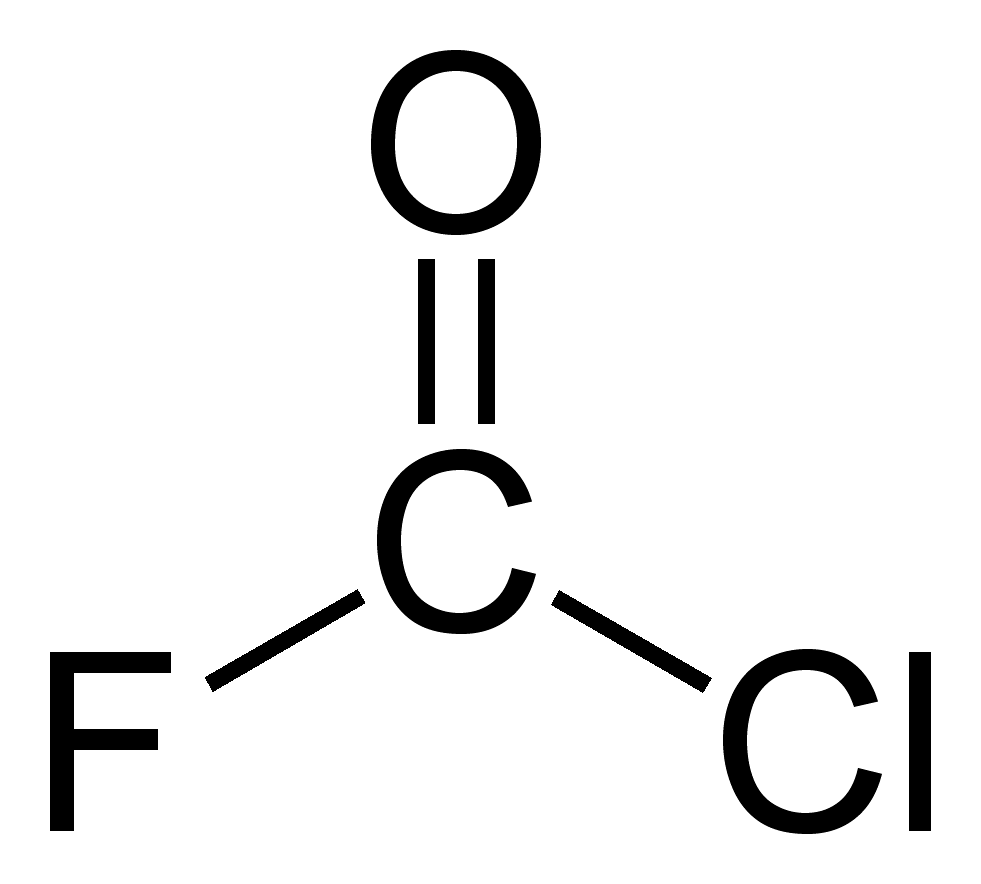
CO + ClF →

== Safety ==
Chlorine monofluoride is extremely reactive. It instantly destroys glass and ignites organic material on contact, reacts violently with water, is highly corrosive to mucous membranes and the skin, eyes, and respiratory tract, and may cause permanent blindness.

== See also ==
- Chlorine fluorides
- Oxygen monofluoride
