= Bromine pentafluoride =

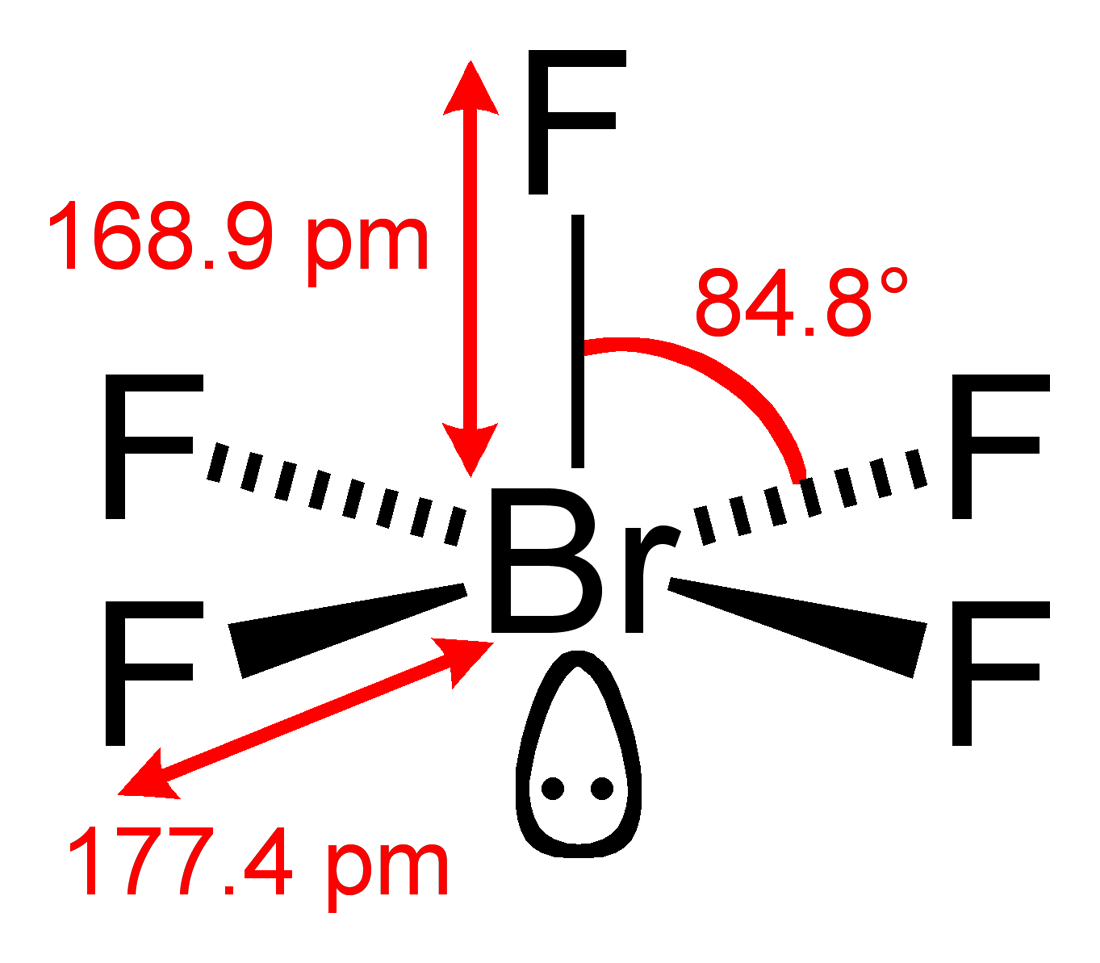
- Structure and dimensions of the bromine pentafluoride molecule in the gas phase

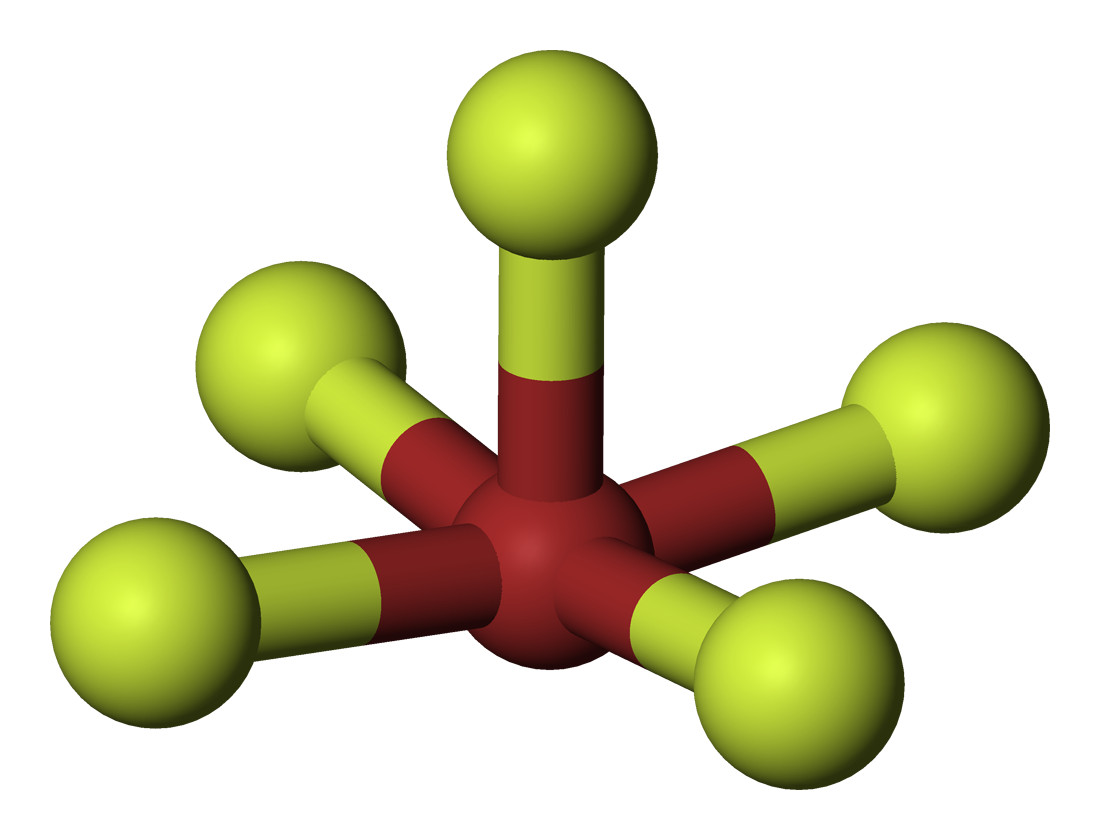
Ball-and-stick model of bromine pentafluoride
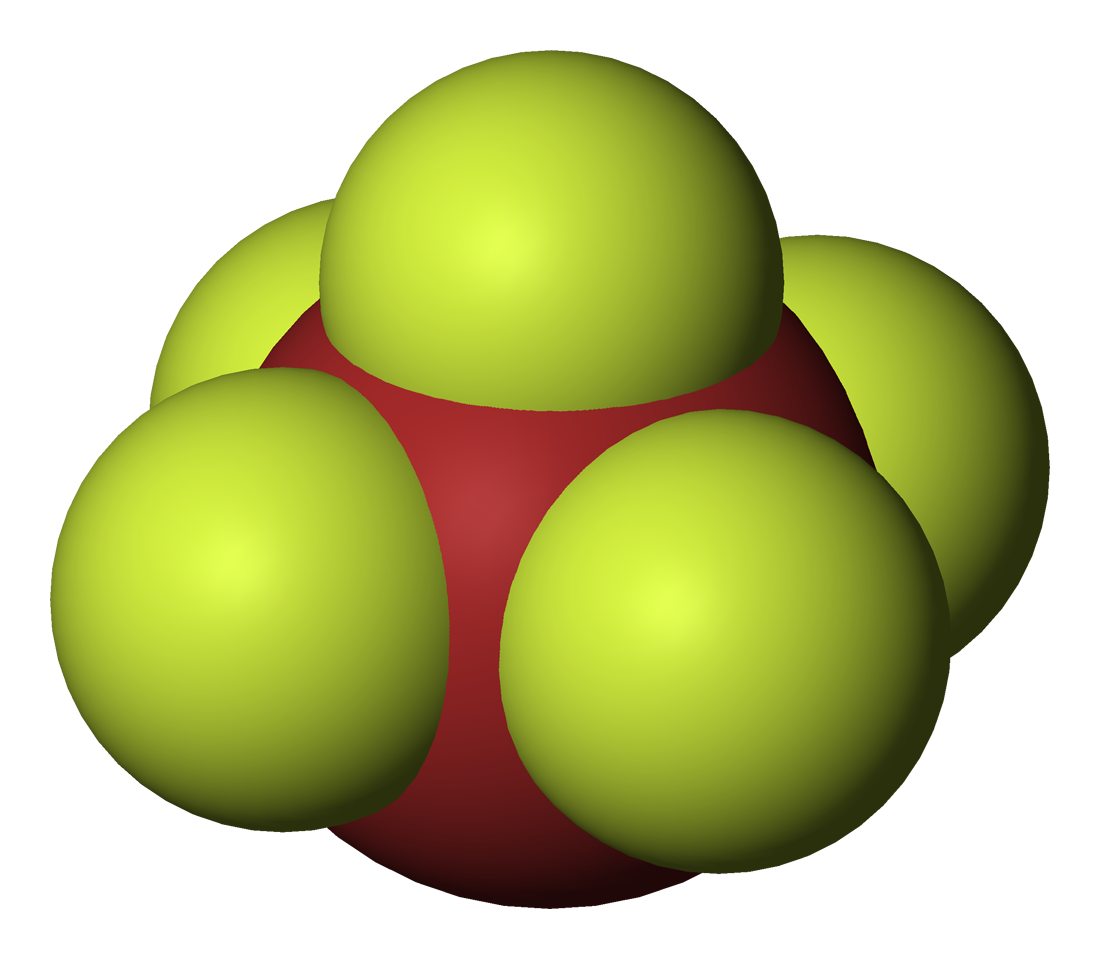
Space-filling model of bromine pentafluoride

Names
- IUPAC name Bromine pentafluoride

Identifiers
CAS Number	7789-30-2
3D model (JSmol)	Interactive image
ChemSpider	23008
ECHA InfoCard	100.029.234
EC Number	232-157-8
PubChem CID	24606
RTECS number	EF9350000
UNII	UPI6B7Y9UQ
UN number	1745
CompTox Dashboard (EPA)	DTXSID30894171
- InChI: InChI=1S/BrF5/c2-1(3,4,5)6 Key: XHVUVQAANZKEKF-UHFFFAOYSA-N; InChI=1/BrF5/c2-1(3,4,5)6 Key: XHVUVQAANZKEKF-UHFFFAOYAC
- SMILES: FBr(F)(F)(F)F

Properties
Chemical formula	BrF_{5}
Molar mass	174.894 g.mol^{−1}
Appearance	Pale yellow liquid
Density	2.466 g/cm^{3}
Melting point	−61.30 °C (−78.34 °F; 211.85 K)
Boiling point	40.25 °C (104.45 °F; 313.40 K)
Solubility in water	Reacts with water

Structure
Point group	C_{4V}
Molecular shape	Square pyramidal

Hazards
- Occupational safety and health (OHS/OSH)
Main hazards	Powerful oxidizer, corrosive, highly toxic, reacts violently with water to release HF
- GHS labelling
Pictograms	(GHS03: Oxidizing) (GHS05: Corrosive) (GHS06: Toxic) (GHS08: Health hazard)
Signal word	Danger
Hazard statements	H271, H300+H310+H330, H314, H372
Precautionary statements	P210, P220, P221, P260, P264, P270, P271, P280, P283, P284, P301+P310, P301+P330+P331, P303+P361+P353, P304+P340, P305+P351+P338, P306+P360, P307+P311, P309+P311, P310, P314, P320, P321, P331, P363, P370+P378, P371+P380+P375, P403+P233, P405, P501
NFPA 704 (fire diamond)	4 0 3 W; OX
Flash point	Non-flammable
- NIOSH (US health exposure limits)
PEL (Permissible)	none
REL (Recommended)	TWA 0.1 ppm (0.7 mg/m^{3})
IDLH (Immediate danger)	N.D.
Safety data sheet (SDS)	External MSDS

Related compounds
Other anions	Bromine monochloride
Other cations	Chlorine pentafluoride Iodine pentafluoride
Related compounds	Bromine monofluoride Bromine trifluoride

Supplementary data page
- Bromine pentafluoride (data page)
- Except where otherwise noted, data are given for materials in their standard state (at 25 °C [77 °F], 100 kPa). verify (what is ?) Infobox references

Bromine pentafluoride, BrF_{5}, is an interhalogen compound and a fluoride of bromine. It is a strong fluorinating agent.

BrF_{5} finds use in oxygen isotope analysis. Laser ablation of solid silicates in the presence of BrF_{5} releases O_{2} for subsequent analysis. It has also been tested as an oxidizer in liquid rocket propellants and is used as a fluorinating agent in the processing of uranium.

== Preparation ==
BrF_{5} was first prepared in 1931 by the direct reaction of bromine and fluorine. This reaction is suitable for the preparation of large quantities, and is carried out at temperatures over 150 °C (302 °F) with an excess of fluorine:

Br_{2} + 5 F_{2} → 2 BrF_{5}

For the preparation of smaller amounts, potassium bromide is used:

KBr + 3 F_{2} → KF + BrF_{5}

This route yields BrF_{5} almost completely free of trifluorides and other impurities.

== Reactions ==
BrF_{5} reacts with water to form bromic acid and hydrofluoric acid:

BrF_{5} + 3 H_{2}O → HBrO_{3} + 5 HF

It is an extremely effective fluorinating agent, being able to convert most metals to their highest fluorides even at room temperature. With uranium and uranium compounds, it can be used to produce uranium hexafluoride:

5 U + 6 BrF_{5} → 5 UF_{6} + 3 Br_{2}

== Hazards ==
BrF_{5} reacts violently with water, and is severely corrosive and toxic. Its vapors are also extremely irritating to all parts of the human body, especially the skin, eyes and other mucous membranes. Like many other interhalogen compounds, it will release "smoke" containing acidic vapors if exposed to moist air, which comes from its reaction with the water in the air. Exposure to 100 ppm or more for more than one minute is lethal to most experimental animals. Chronic exposure may cause kidney damage and liver failure.

Additionally, BrF_{5} is a strong oxidizing agent and may spontaneously ignite or explode upon contact with flammable substances such as organic materials and metal dust.
