= Iodine monofluoride =

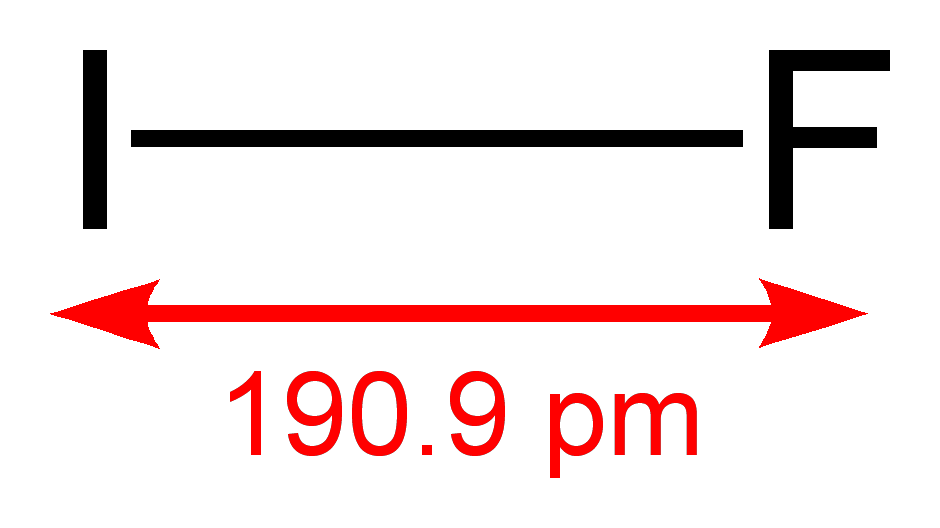

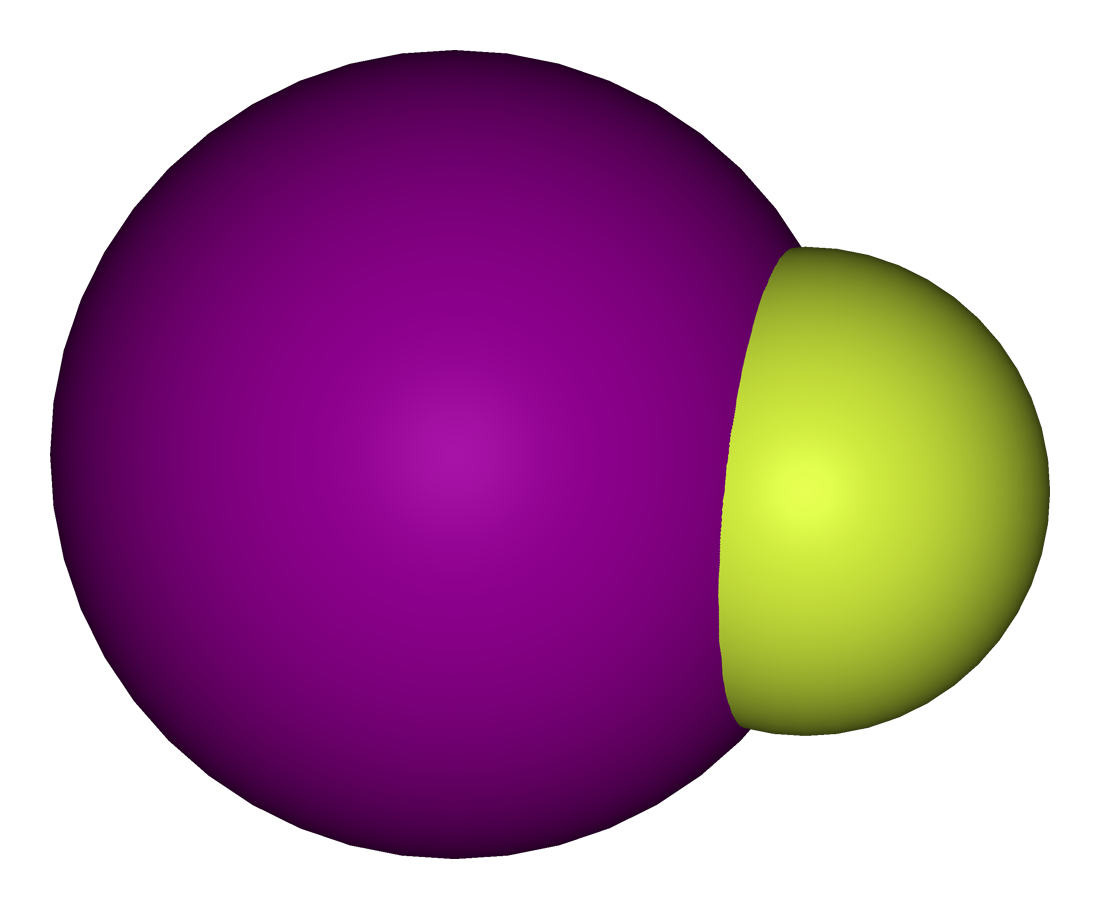

Names
- IUPAC name Iodine monofluoride
- Other names Iodine fluoride

Identifiers
CAS Number	13873-84-2
3D model (JSmol)	Interactive image
ChemSpider	123150
PubChem CID	139637
CompTox Dashboard (EPA)	DTXSID50160764
- InChI: InChI=1S/FI/c1-2 Key: PDJAZCSYYQODQF-UHFFFAOYSA-N; InChI=1/FI/c1-2 Key: PDJAZCSYYQODQF-UHFFFAOYAT
- SMILES: FI

Properties
Chemical formula	IF
Molar mass	145.903 g/mol
Appearance	unstable brown solid
Melting point	−45 °C (−49 °F; 228 K)

Related compounds
Other anions	Iodine monochloride Iodine monobromide Astatine monoiodide
Other cations	Chlorine monofluoride Bromine monofluoride
Related compounds	Iodine trifluoride Iodine pentafluoride Iodine heptafluoride
- Except where otherwise noted, data are given for materials in their standard state (at 25 °C [77 °F], 100 kPa). verify (what is ?) Infobox references

Iodine monofluoride is an interhalogen compound of iodine and fluorine with formula IF. It is a chocolate-brown solid that decomposes at 0 °C, disproportionating to elemental iodine and iodine pentafluoride:

5 IF → 2 I_{2} + IF_{5}

However, its molecular properties can still be precisely determined by spectroscopy: the iodine-fluorine distance is 190.9 pm and the I−F bond dissociation energy is around 277 kJ mol^{−1}. At 298 K, its standard enthalpy change of formation is Δ_{f}H° = −95.4 kJ mol^{−1}, and its Gibbs free energy is Δ_{f}G° = −117.6 kJ mol^{−1}.

It can be generated, albeit only fleetingly, by the reaction of the elements at −45 °C in CCl_{3}F:

I_{2} + F_{2} → 2 IF

It can also be generated by the reaction of iodine with iodine trifluoride at −78 °C in CCl_{3}F:

I_{2} + IF_{3} → 3 IF

The reaction of iodine with silver(I) fluoride at 0 °C also yields iodine monofluoride:

I_{2} + AgF → IF + AgI

== Reactions ==
Iodine monofluoride is used to produce pure nitrogen triiodide:

BN + 3 IF → NI_{3} + BF_{3}

== See also ==
- Iodine trifluoride
- Iodine pentafluoride
- Iodine heptafluoride
