= Wijs =

Wijs is a Dutch surname that may refer to the following notable people:

- J.J.A. Wijs (1864–1942), Dutch chemist, known for Wijs solution and Wijs/ Hanuš method
- Jordy de Wijs (born 1995), Dutch football player
