= Astatine iodide =

Names
- IUPAC name Astatine monoiodide
- Other names Astatine iodide

Identifiers
CAS Number	15194-73-7
3D model (JSmol)	Interactive image
ChemSpider	34496389
PubChem CID	72993917
CompTox Dashboard (EPA)	DTXSID901030152
- InChI: InChI=1S/AtH2.HI/h1H2;1H/q+1;/p-1 Key: TWAXUBWUPRBIEH-UHFFFAOYSA-M; InChI=1/AtH2.HI/h1H2;1H/q+1;/p-1 Key: TWAXUBWUPRBIEH-REWHXWOFAE
- SMILES: I[At]

Properties
Chemical formula	AtI
Molar mass	336.904 g/mol
Boiling point	213 °C; 415 °F; 486 K

Related compounds
Other anions	Astatine monobromide Astatine monochloride
Related interhalogen compounds	Iodine monochloride Iodine monofluoride Bromine monochloride
- Except where otherwise noted, data are given for materials in their standard state (at 25 °C [77 °F], 100 kPa). Infobox references

Astatine iodide is an interhalogen compound with the chemical formula AtI. It is the second heaviest known interhalogen compound, after iodine tribromide.

== Production ==
Astatine iodide is produced by the direct combination of astatine and iodine in a 1:1 molar ratio:

At_{2} + I_{2} → 2 AtI

== Bibliography ==
- Zuckerman, J J; Hagen, A P (1989). Inorganic Reactions and Methods, the Formation of Bonds to Halogens. John Wiley & Sons. ISBN 978-0-471-18656-4.
