= Chlorine fluoride =

Chemical compound

Chlorine fluoride is an interhalogen compound containing only chlorine and fluorine.

	ClF	ClF_{3}	ClF_{5}
Systematic name	Chlorine monofluoride	Chlorine trifluoride	Chlorine pentafluoride
Molar mass	54.45 g/mol	92.45 g/mol	130.45 g/mol
CAS number	7790-89-8	7790-91-2	13637-63-3
Melting point	−155.6 °C	−76.3 °C	−103 °C
Boiling point	−100 °C	11.8 °C	−13.1 °C
Standard enthalpy of formation Δ_{f}H°_{gas}	−50.29 kJ/mol	−158.87 kJ/mol	−238.49 kJ/mol
Standard molar entropy S°_{gas}	217.91 J·K^{−1}·mol^{−1}	281.59 J·K^{−1}·mol^{−1}	310.73 J·K^{−1}·mol^{−1}
Heat capacity C_{p}	33.01 J·K^{−1}·mol^{−1}	60.40 J·K^{−1}·mol^{−1}	89.16 J·K^{−1}·mol^{−1}
