= Astatine bromide =

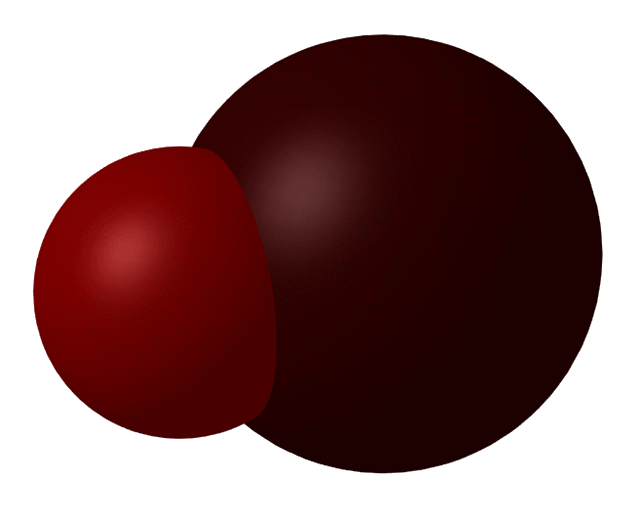

Names
- IUPAC name Astatine monobromide
- Other names Astatine bromide

Identifiers
CAS Number	15194-69-1
3D model (JSmol)	Interactive image
PubChem CID	165363845
CompTox Dashboard (EPA)	DTXSID801030511
- InChI: InChI=1S/AtBr/c1-2; InChI=1/AtBr/c1-2
- SMILES: At[Br]

Properties
Chemical formula	AtBr
Molar mass	289.904 g/mol

Related compounds
Other anions	Astatine monoiodide Astatine monochloride
Related compounds	Bromine monochloride Bromine monofluoride
- Except where otherwise noted, data are given for materials in their standard state (at 25 °C [77 °F], 100 kPa). Infobox references

Astatine bromide is an interhalogen compound with the chemical formula AtBr.

== Production ==
Astatine bromide is produced by the reaction of astatine with an aqueous solution of iodine monobromide:

At_{2} + 2 IBr → 2 AtBr + I_{2}

Astatine bromide also can produce by reacting elemental astatine and bromine:

At_{2} + Br_{2} → 2 AtBr
