= Bromine trifluoride =

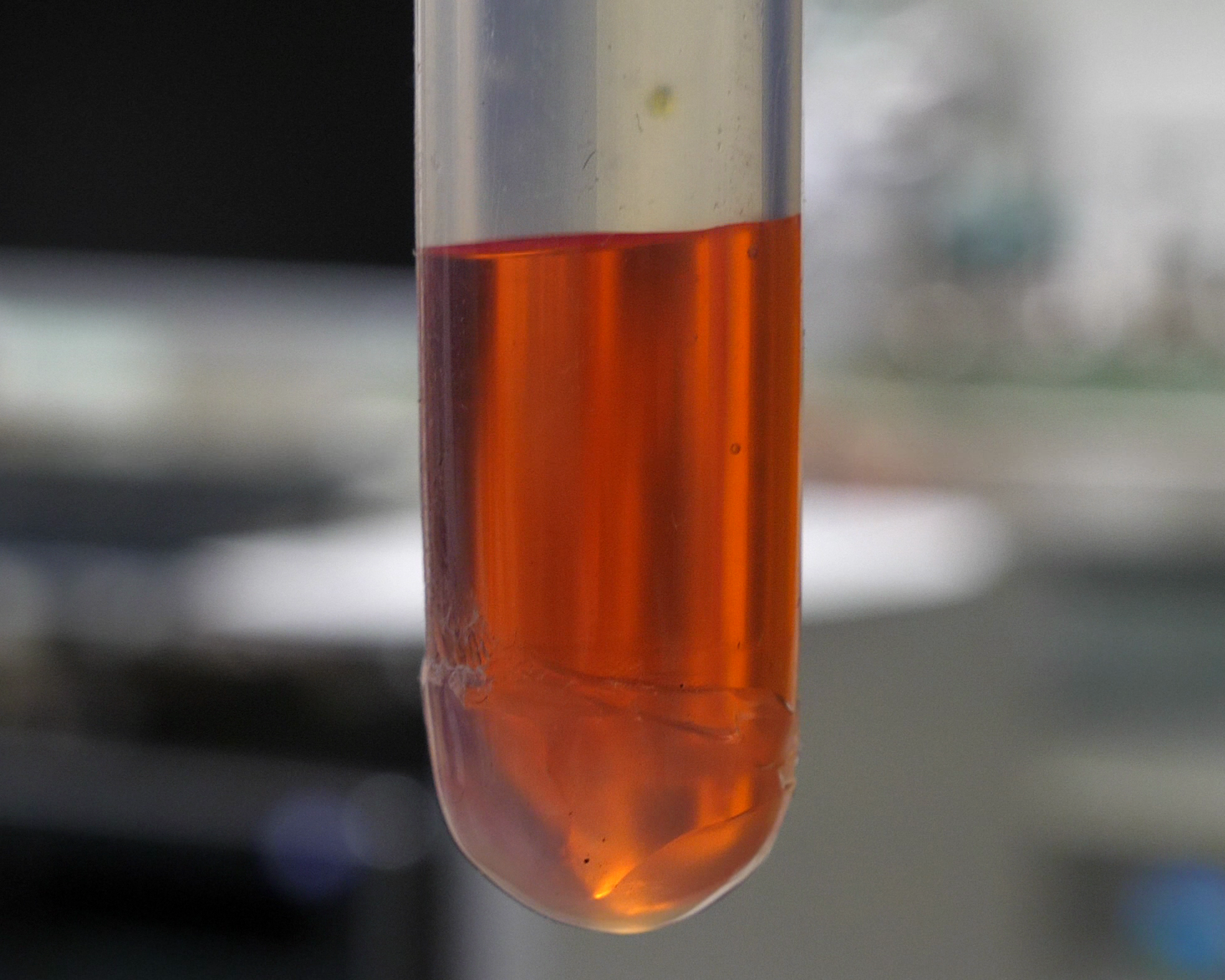

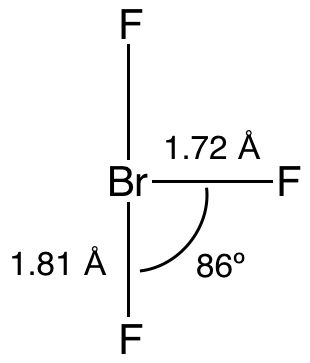
- Structural formula, showing bond lengths and angles

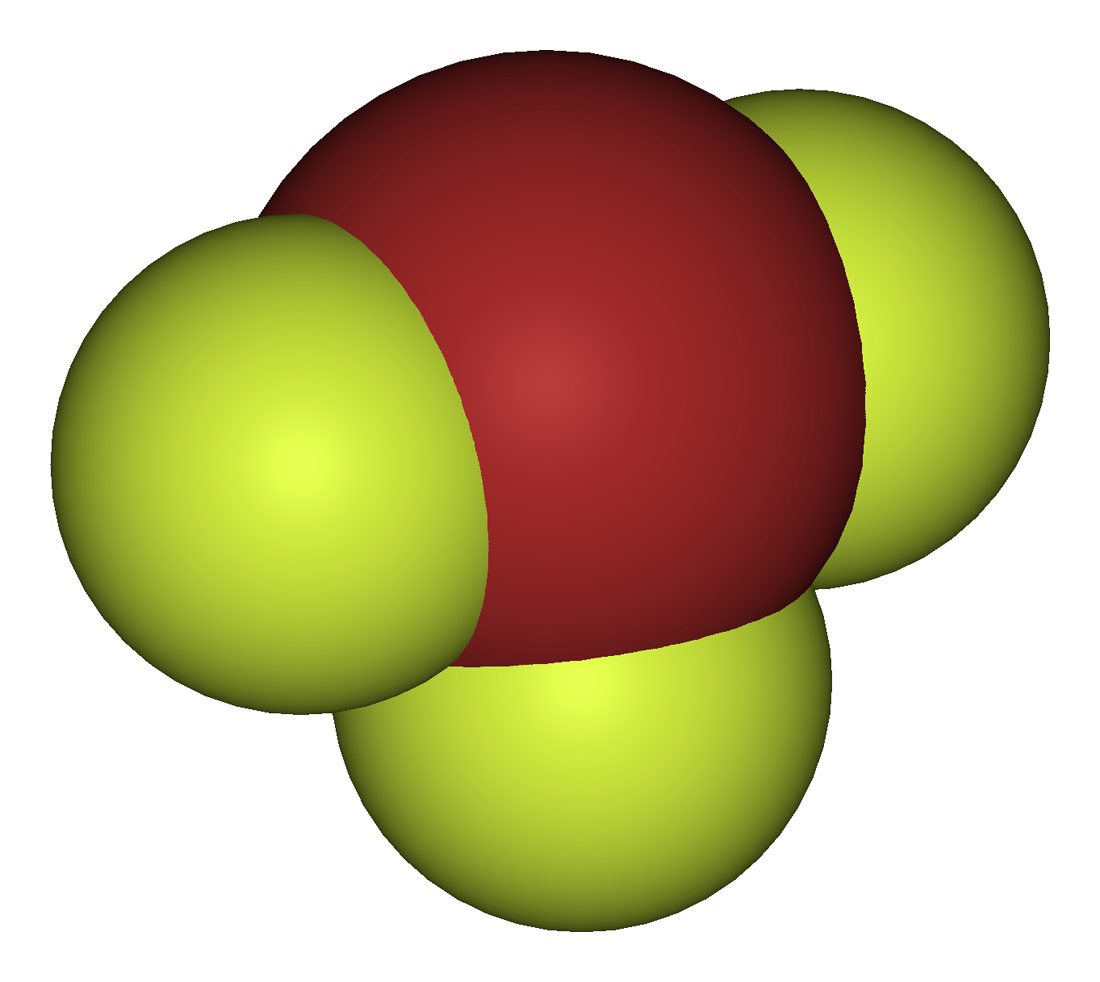

Identifiers
CAS Number	7787-71-5
3D model (JSmol)	Interactive image
ChemSpider	22996
ECHA InfoCard	100.029.211
EC Number	232-132-1
PubChem CID	24594
UNII	BD697HEL7X
UN number	1746
CompTox Dashboard (EPA)	DTXSID70894170
- InChI: InChI=1S/BrF3/c2-1(3)4 Key: FQFKTKUFHWNTBN-UHFFFAOYSA-N
- SMILES: FBr(F)F

Properties
Chemical formula	BrF_{3}
Molar mass	136.90 g/mol
Appearance	straw-coloured liquid hygroscopic
Odor	Choking, pungent
Density	2.803 g/cm^{3}
Melting point	8.77 °C (47.79 °F; 281.92 K)
Boiling point	125.72 °C (258.30 °F; 398.87 K)
Solubility in water	Reacts with water

Structure
Molecular shape	T-shaped (C_{2v})
Dipole moment	1.19 D

Hazards
- Occupational safety and health (OHS/OSH)
Main hazards	Reacts violently with water to release HF, highly toxic, corrosive, powerful oxidizer
- GHS labelling
Pictograms	(GHS03: Oxidizing) (GHS05: Corrosive) (GHS06: Toxic) (GHS08: Health hazard)
Signal word	Danger
Hazard statements	H271, H300+H310+H330, H314, H373
Precautionary statements	P102, P103, P210, P220, P221, P260, P264, P271, P280, P283, P284, P301+P310, P301+P330+P331, P303+P361+P353, P304+P312, P305+P351+P338+P310, P306+P360, P308+P313, P340, P363, P370+P380
NFPA 704 (fire diamond)	4 0 4 W; OX
Safety data sheet (SDS)	http://www.chammascutters.com/en/downloads/Bromine-Trifluoride-MSDS.pdf

Related compounds
Other anions	Bromine monochloride
Other cations	Chlorine trifluoride Iodine trifluoride
Related compounds	Bromine monofluoride Bromine pentafluoride

Supplementary data page
- Bromine trifluoride (data page)
- Except where otherwise noted, data are given for materials in their standard state (at 25 °C [77 °F], 100 kPa). verify (what is ?) Infobox references

Bromine trifluoride is an interhalogen compound with the formula BrF_{3}. At room temperature, it is a straw-coloured liquid with a pungent odor which decomposes violently on contact with water and organic compounds. It is a powerful fluorinating agent and an ionizing inorganic solvent. It is used to produce uranium hexafluoride (UF_{6}) in the processing and reprocessing of nuclear fuel.

== Synthesis ==
Bromine trifluoride was first described by Paul Lebeau in 1906, who obtained the material by the reaction of bromine with fluorine at 20 °C:

Br_{2} + 3 F_{2} → 2 BrF_{3}

The disproportionation of bromine monofluoride also gives bromine trifluoride:

3 BrF → BrF_{3} + Br_{2}

== Structure ==
Like ClF_{3} and IF_{3}, the BrF_{3} molecule is T-shaped and planar. In the VSEPR formalism, the bromine center is assigned two electron lone pairs. The distance from the bromine atom to each axial fluorine atom is 1.81 Å and to the equatorial fluorine atom is 1.72 Å. The angle between an axial fluorine atom and the equatorial fluorine atom is slightly smaller than 90° — the 86.2° angle observed is due to the repulsion generated by the electron pairs being greater than that of the Br-F bonds.

== Chemical properties ==
In a highly exothermic reaction, BrF_{3} reacts with water to form hydrobromic acid and hydrofluoric acid:

BrF_{3} + 2 H_{2}O → 3 HF + HBr + O_{2}

BrF_{3} is a fluorinating agent, but less reactive than ClF_{3}. Already at −196 °C, it reacts with acetonitrile to give 1,1,1-trifluoroethane.

BrF_{3} + CH_{3}CN → CH_{3}CF_{3} + 1/2 Br_{2} + 1/2 N_{2}

The liquid is conducting, owing to autoionisation:

2 BrF_{3} ⇌ BrF^{+}_{2} + BrF^{−}_{4}

Fluoride salts dissolve readily in BrF_{3} forming tetrafluorobromate:

KF + BrF_{3} → KBrF_{4}

It reacts as a fluoride donor:

BrF_{3} + SbF_{5} → [BrF^{+}_{2}][SbF^{−}_{6}]
