= ATCL =

ATCL may refer to:

- Air Tanzania Company Limited, the state-owned airline of Tanzania
- Associate of Trinity College London
- Astatine monochloride, AtCl
