= Iodine pentafluoride =

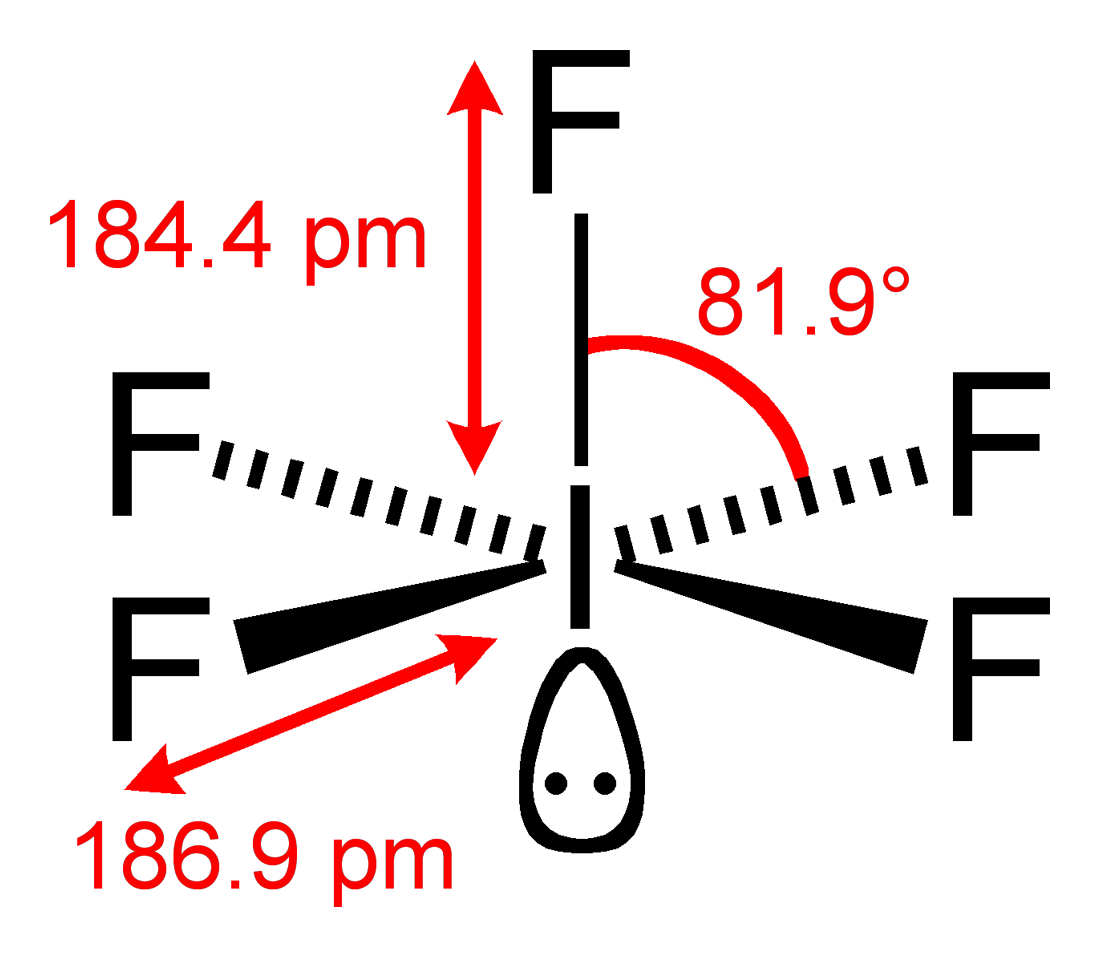
Stereo structural formula of iodine pentafluoride
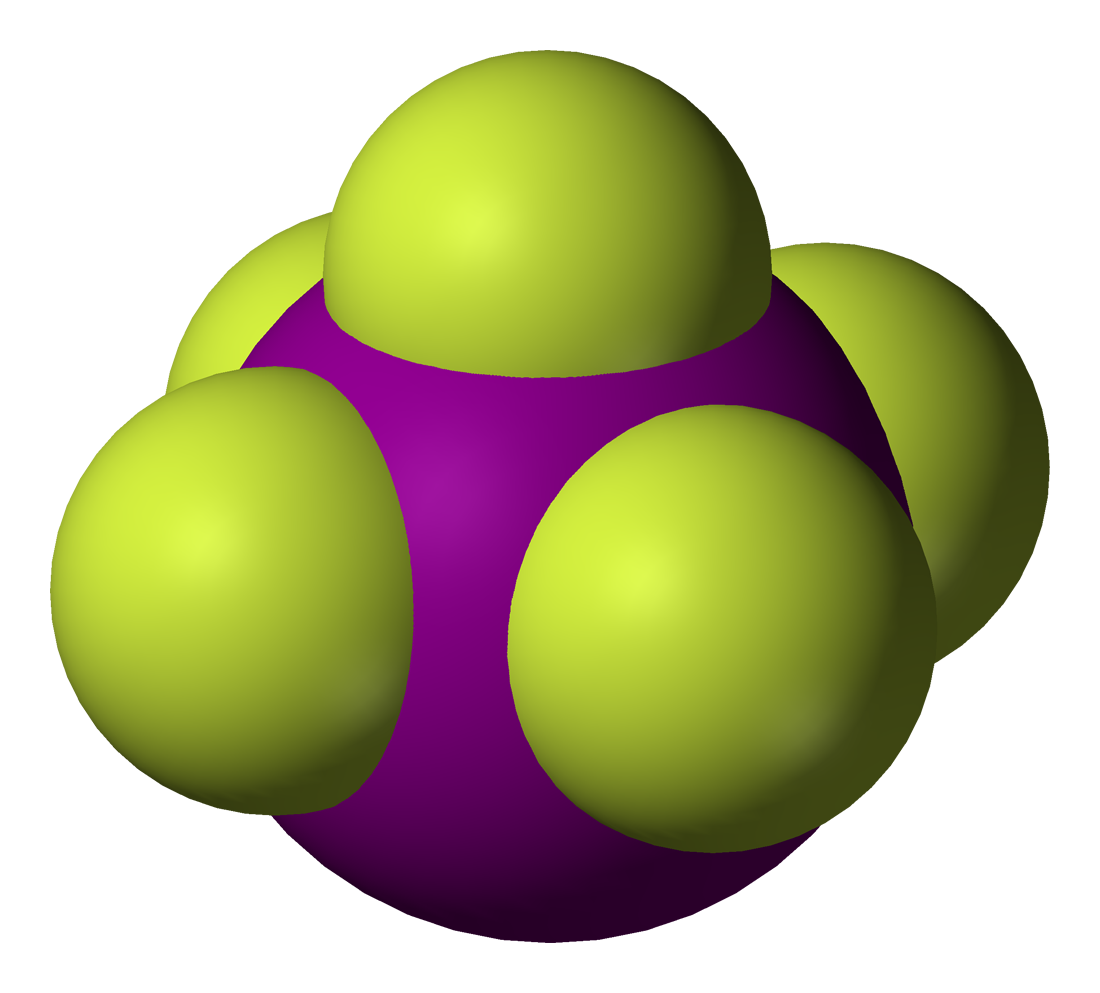
Space-filling model of iodine pentafluoride

Names
- Preferred IUPAC name Iodine(V) fluoride
- Systematic IUPAC name Pentafluoro-λ^{5}-iodane
- Other names Iodic fluoride

Identifiers
CAS Number	7783-66-6
3D model (JSmol)	Interactive image
ChemSpider	455940
ECHA InfoCard	100.029.108
EC Number	232-019-7
PubChem CID	522683
UNII	LFD5C04ER3
CompTox Dashboard (EPA)	DTXSID2052524
- InChI: InChI=1S/F5I/c1-6(2,3,4)5 Key: PJIYEPACCBMRLZ-UHFFFAOYSA-N; InChI=1S/F5I/c1-6(2,3,4)5 Key: PJIYEPACCBMRLZ-UHFFFAOYSA-N; InChI=1/F5I/c1-6(2,3,4)5 Key: PJIYEPACCBMRLZ-UHFFFAOYAU
- SMILES: FI(F)(F)(F)F

Properties
Chemical formula	IF_{5}
Molar mass	221.89 g/mol
Appearance	colorless liquid
Density	3.250 g/cm^{3}
Melting point	9.43 °C (48.97 °F; 282.58 K)
Boiling point	97.85 °C (208.13 °F; 371.00 K)
Solubility in water	Reacts
Magnetic susceptibility (χ)	−58.1·10^{−6} cm^{3}/mol
Viscosity	2.111 mPa·s

Structure
Crystal structure	Monoclinic
Point group	C_{4V}
Coordination geometry	Square pyramidal
Molecular shape	square pyramidal

Hazards
- Occupational safety and health (OHS/OSH)
Main hazards	Toxic, oxidiser, corrosive, reacts with water to release HF
- GHS labelling
Pictograms	(GHS03: Oxidizing) (GHS05: Corrosive) (GHS06: Toxic) (GHS09: Environmental hazard)
Signal word	Danger
Hazard statements	H271, H301+H311+H331, H314, H371, H410
Precautionary statements	P202, P232, P304, P310
NFPA 704 (fire diamond)	3 0 2 W; OX
Safety data sheet (SDS)	External MSDS

Related compounds
Other anions	Iodine pentoxide
Other cations	Bromine pentafluoride
Related compounds	Iodine monofluoride Iodine trifluoride Iodine heptafluoride
- Except where otherwise noted, data are given for materials in their standard state (at 25 °C [77 °F], 100 kPa). verify (what is ?) Infobox references

Iodine pentafluoride is an interhalogen compound with chemical formula IF_{5}. It is one of the fluorides of iodine. It is a colorless liquid, although impure samples appear yellow. It is used as a fluorination reagent and even a solvent in specialized syntheses.

== Preparation ==
It was first synthesized by Henri Moissan in 1891 by burning solid iodine in fluorine gas. This exothermic reaction is still used to produce iodine pentafluoride, although the reaction conditions have been improved.

I_{2} + 5 F_{2} → 2 IF_{5}

== Reactions ==
IF_{5} reacts vigorously with water forming hydrofluoric acid and iodic acid:

IF_{5} + 3 H_{2}O → HIO_{3} + 5 HF

Upon treatment with fluorine, it converts to iodine heptafluoride:

IF_{5} + F_{2} → IF_{7}

It has been used as a solvent for handling metal fluorides. For example, the reduction of osmium hexafluoride to osmium pentafluoride with iodine is conducted in a solution in iodine pentafluoride:

10 OsF_{6} + I_{2} → 10 OsF_{5} + 2 IF_{5}

Primary amines react with iodine pentafluoride forming nitriles after hydrolysis.
