= J.J.A. Wijs =

Dutch chemist

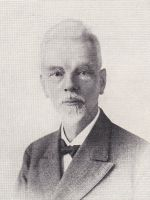
- Born: 12 November 1864; Amsterdam, The Netherlands
- Died: 13 December 1942 (aged 78); The Hague, The Netherlands
- Known for: Wijs reagent
- Scientific career
- Fields: Chemistry

Jacob Jan Alexander Wijs (12 November 1864 – 13 December 1942) was a Dutch chemist. He spent much of his career at the oil factory in Delft, where he studied the iodine value. In 1898 he described the addition of iodine monochloride to the double bond in alkenes to give chloro-iodo alkanes. This reaction was later named the Wijs-Hanuš method, and the reagent that Wijs used in his demonstration, namely iodine monochloride in glacial acetic acid, the Wijs reagent.

In 1895 Wijs married Maria Salm, they had three children, born in 1896, 1900 and 1911.
