= Interhalogen =

Molecule containing only halogen elements of two or more kinds

In chemistry, an interhalogen compound is a molecule which contains two or more different halogen atoms (fluorine, chlorine, bromine, iodine, or astatine) and no atoms of elements from any other group.

Most interhalogen compounds known are binary (composed of only two distinct elements). Their formulae are generally XY_{n}, where n = 1, 3, 5 or 7, and X is the less electronegative of the two halogens. The value of n in interhalogens is always odd, because of the odd valence of halogens. They are all prone to hydrolysis, and ionize to give rise to polyhalogen ions. Those formed with astatine have a very short half-life due to astatine being intensely radioactive.

No interhalogen compounds containing three or more different halogens are definitely known, although a few books claim that IFCl_{2} and IF_{2}Cl have been obtained, and theoretical studies seem to indicate that some compounds in the series BrClF_{n} are barely stable.

Some interhalogens, such as BrF_{3}, IF_{5}, and ICl, are good halogenating agents. BrF_{5} is too reactive to generate fluorine. Beyond that, iodine monochloride has several applications, including helping to measure the saturation of fats and oils, and as a catalyst for some reactions. A number of interhalogens, including IF_{7}, are used to form polyhalides.

Similar compounds exist with various pseudohalogens, such as the halogen azides (FN_{3}, ClN_{3}, BrN_{3}, and IN_{3}) and cyanogen halides (FCN, ClCN, BrCN, and ICN).

== Types of interhalogens ==
F	F_{2}				
Cl	ClF, ClF_{3}, ClF_{5}	Cl_{2}			
Br	BrF, BrF_{3}, BrF_{5}	BrCl	Br_{2}		
I	IF, IF_{3}, IF_{5}, IF_{7}	ICl, (ICl_{3})_{2}	IBr, IBr_{3}	I_{2}	
At	unknown	AtCl	AtBr	AtI	At_{2}(?)
	F	Cl	Br	I	At

The table summarises the known types of interhalogen compounds. For non-diatomic molecules, atoms listed on the left-hand side are the central atom. Larger atoms (bromine, iodine) can accommodate more smaller atoms (fluorine, chlorine) around themselves, allowing access to a wider range of coordination numbers (3, 5, 7). The greater the size difference between the two halogens, the higher the coordination number can be, which is why higher-order interhalogens are often fluorides (fluorine is the smallest halogen). The absence of certain combinations like ClF_{7} and BrCl_{3} reflects these steric and electronic limitations; meanwhile, the absence of astatine compounds is due to its high radioactivity.

=== Diatomic interhalogens ===
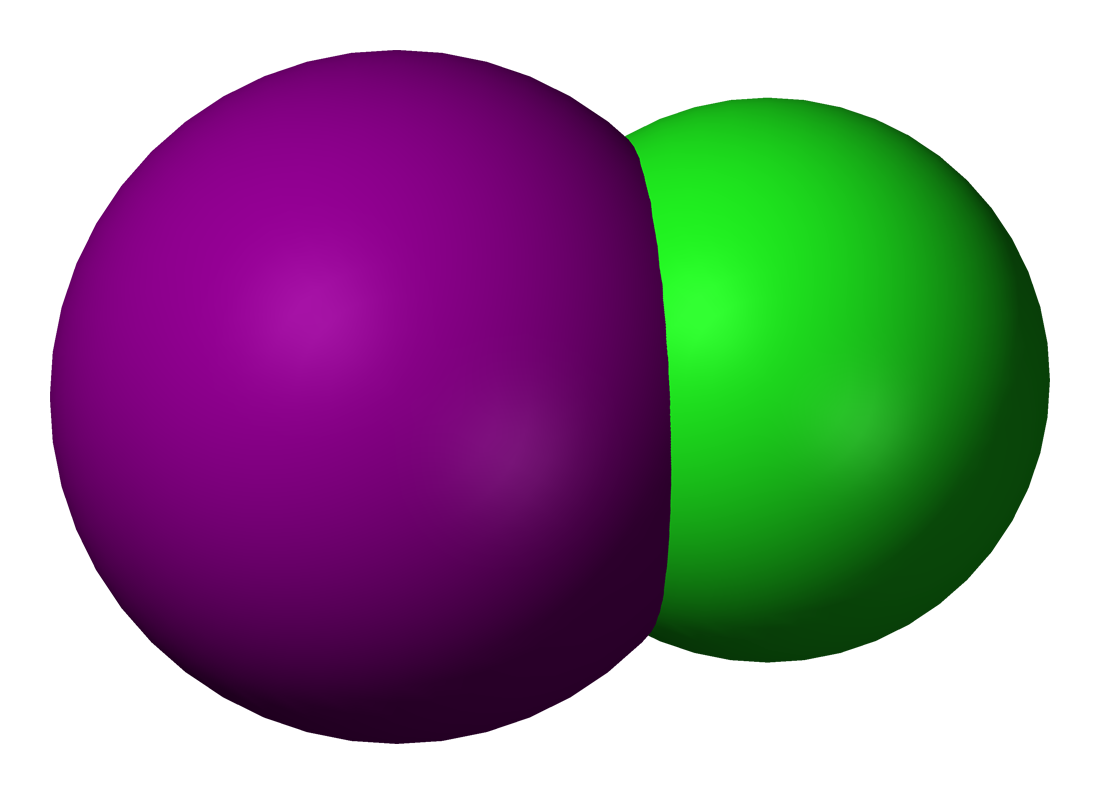
Iodine monochloride

The interhalogens of form XY have physical properties intermediate between those of the two parent halogens. The covalent bond between the two atoms has some ionic character, the less electronegative halogen, X, being oxidised and having a partial positive charge. All combinations of fluorine, chlorine, bromine, and iodine that have the above-mentioned general formula are known, but not all are stable. Some combinations of astatine with other halogens are not even known, and those that are known are highly unstable.

- Chlorine monofluoride (ClF) is the lightest interhalogen compound. ClF is a colorless gas with a normal boiling point of −100 °C.
- Bromine monofluoride (BrF) has not been obtained as a pure compound — it dissociates into the trifluoride and free bromine. It is created according to the following equation:

Br_{2}(l) + F_{2}(g) → 2 BrF(g)

Bromine monofluoride dissociates like this:

3 BrF → Br_{2} + BrF_{3}

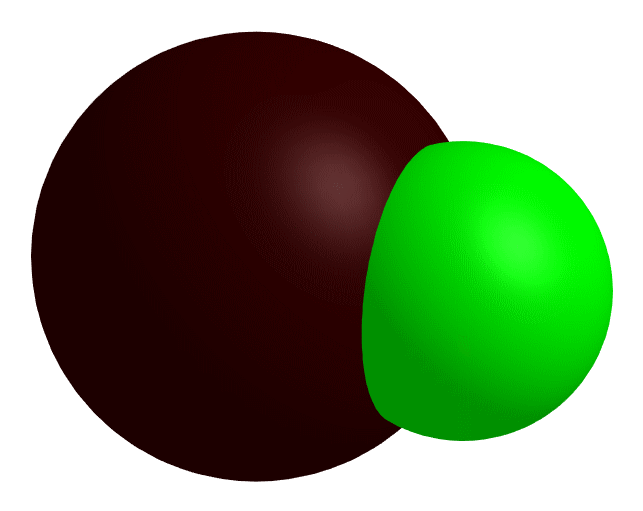
Astatine chloride

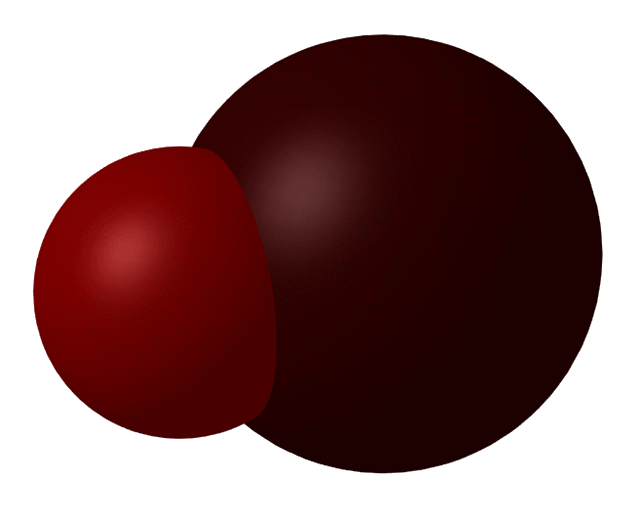
Astatine bromide

Astatine iodide

- Iodine monofluoride (IF) is unstable and decomposes at 0 °C, disproportionating into elemental iodine and iodine pentafluoride.
- Bromine monochloride (BrCl) is a yellow-brown gas with a boiling point of 5 °C.
- Iodine monochloride (ICl) exists as red transparent crystals that melt at 27.2 °C to form a choking brownish liquid (similar in appearance and weight to bromine). It reacts with HCl to form the strong acid HICl_{2}. The crystal structure of iodine monochloride consists of puckered zig-zag chains, with strong interactions between the chains.
- Astatine monochloride (AtCl) is made either by the direct combination of gas-phase astatine with chlorine or by the sequential addition of astatine and dichromate ion to an acidic chloride solution.
- Iodine monobromide (IBr) is made by the direct combination of the elements to form a dark red crystalline solid. It melts at 42 °C and boils at 116 °C to form a partially dissociated vapour.
- Astatine monobromide (AtBr) is made by the direct combination of astatine with either bromine vapour or an aqueous solution of iodine monobromide.
- Astatine monoiodide (AtI) is made by direct combination of astatine and iodine.

No astatine fluorides have been discovered yet. Their absence has been speculatively attributed to the extreme reactivity of such compounds, including the reaction of an initially formed fluoride with the walls of the glass container to form a non-volatile product. (Note: An initial attempt to fluoridate astatine using chlorine trifluoride resulted in formation of a product which became stuck to the glass. Chlorine monofluoride, chlorine, and tetrafluorosilane were formed. The authors called the effect "puzzling", admitting they had expected formation of a volatile fluoride. Ten years later, the compound was predicted to be non-volatile, out of line with the other halogens but similar to radon difluoride; by this time, the latter had been shown to be ionic.) Thus, although the synthesis of an astatine fluoride is thought to be possible, it may require a liquid halogen fluoride solvent, as has already been used for the characterization of radon fluorides.

In addition, there exist analogous molecules involving pseudohalogens, such as the cyanogen halides.

=== Tetratomic interhalogens ===
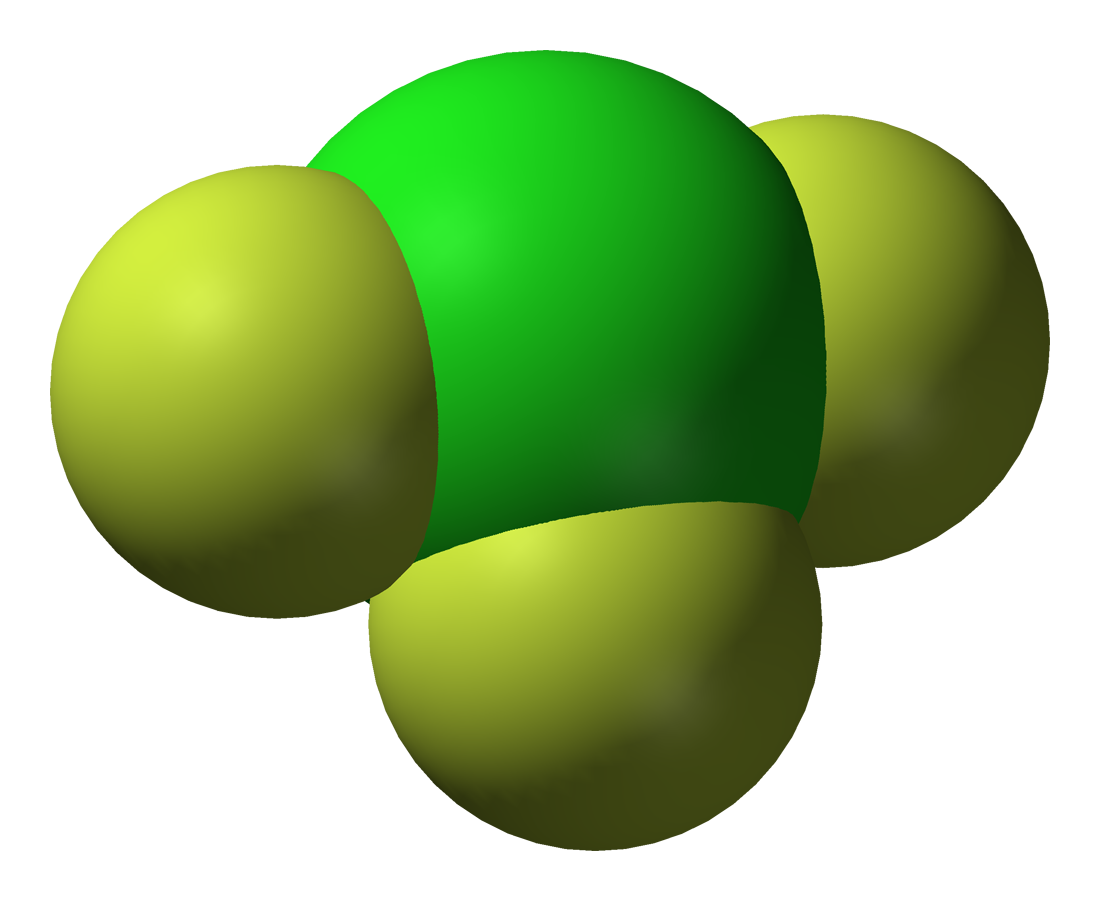
Chlorine trifluoride

- Chlorine trifluoride (ClF_{3}) is a colourless gas that condenses to a green liquid, and freezes to a white solid. It is made by reacting chlorine with an excess of fluorine at 250 °C in a nickel tube. It reacts more violently than fluorine, often explosively. The molecule is planar and T-shaped. It is used in the manufacture of uranium hexafluoride.
- Bromine trifluoride (BrF_{3}) is a yellow-green liquid that conducts electricity — it self-ionises to form [BrF_{2}]^{+} and [BrF_{4}]^{−}. It reacts with many metals and metal oxides to form similar ionised entities; with other metals, it forms the metal fluoride plus free bromine and oxygen; and with water, it forms hydrofluoric acid and hydrobromic acid. It is used in organic chemistry as a fluorinating agent. It has the same molecular shape as chlorine trifluoride.
- Iodine trifluoride (IF_{3}) is a yellow solid that decomposes above −28 °C. It can be synthesised from the elements, but care must be taken to avoid the formation of IF_{5}. F_{2} attacks I_{2} to yield IF_{3} at −45 °C in CCl_{3}F. Alternatively, at low temperatures, the fluorination reaction

I_{2} + 3 XeF_{2} → 2 IF_{3} + 3 Xe

can be used. Not much is known about iodine trifluoride as it is so unstable.

- Iodine trichloride (ICl_{3}) forms lemon yellow crystals that melt under pressure to a brown liquid. It can be made from the elements at low temperature, or from iodine pentoxide and hydrogen chloride. It reacts with many metal chlorides to form tetrachloroiodides (ICl^{−}_{4}), and hydrolyses in water. The molecule is a planar dimer (ICl_{3})_{2}, with each iodine atom surrounded by four chlorine atoms.
- Iodine tribromide (IBr_{3}) is a dark brown liquid.

=== Hexatomic interhalogens ===
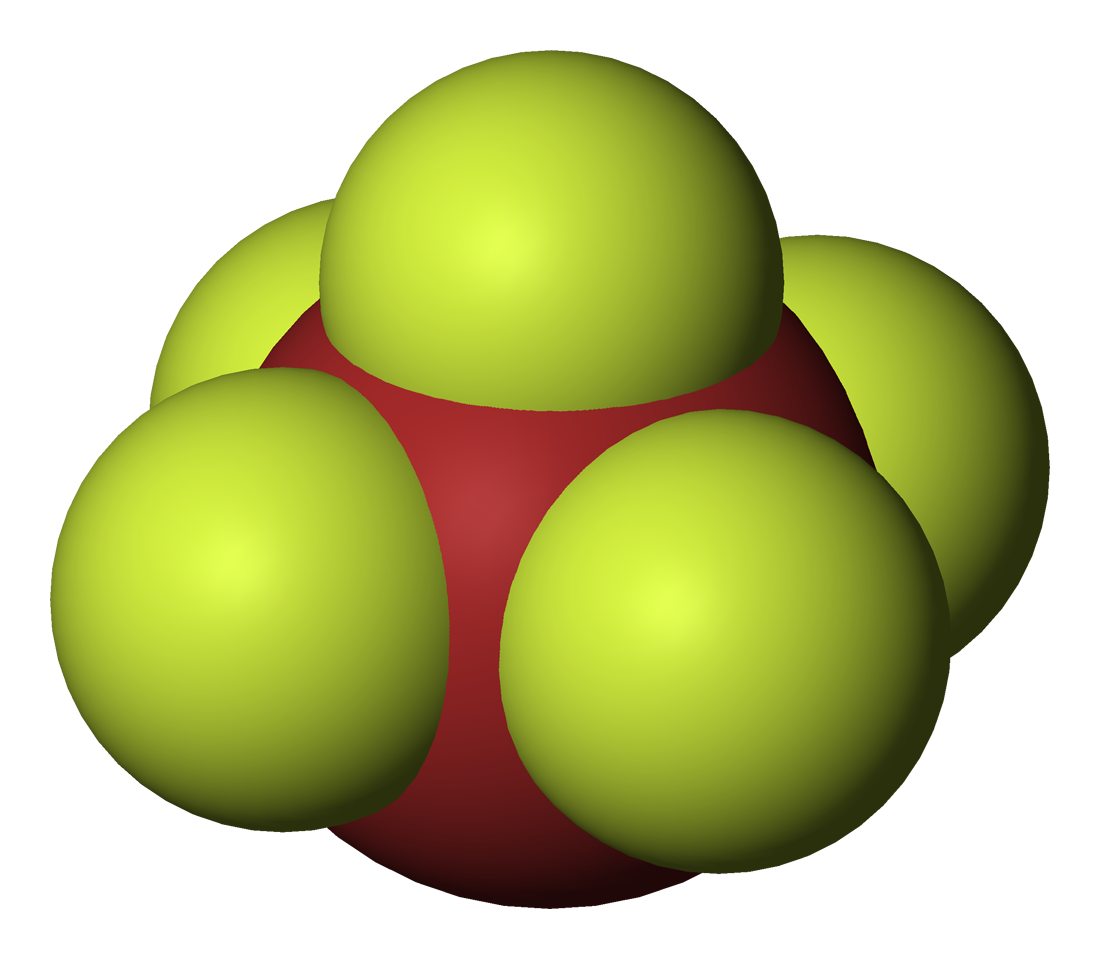
Bromine pentafluoride

All stable hexatomic and octatomic interhalogens involve a heavier halogen combined with five or seven fluorine atoms. Unlike the other halogens, fluorine atoms have high electronegativity and small size which is able to stabilize them.

- Chlorine pentafluoride (ClF_{5}) is a colourless gas, made by reacting chlorine trifluoride with fluorine at high temperatures and high pressures. It reacts violently with water and most metals and nonmetals.
- Bromine pentafluoride (BrF_{5}) is a colourless fuming liquid, made by reacting bromine trifluoride with fluorine at 200 °C. It is physically stable, but decomposes violently on contact with water, organic substances, and most metals and nonmetals.
- Iodine pentafluoride (IF_{5}) is a colourless liquid, made by reacting iodine pentoxide with fluorine, or iodine with silver(II) fluoride. It is highly reactive, even slowly with glass. It reacts with water to form hydrofluoric acid and with fluorine gas to form iodine heptafluoride. The molecule has the form of a tetragonal pyramid.

=== Octatomic interhalogens ===
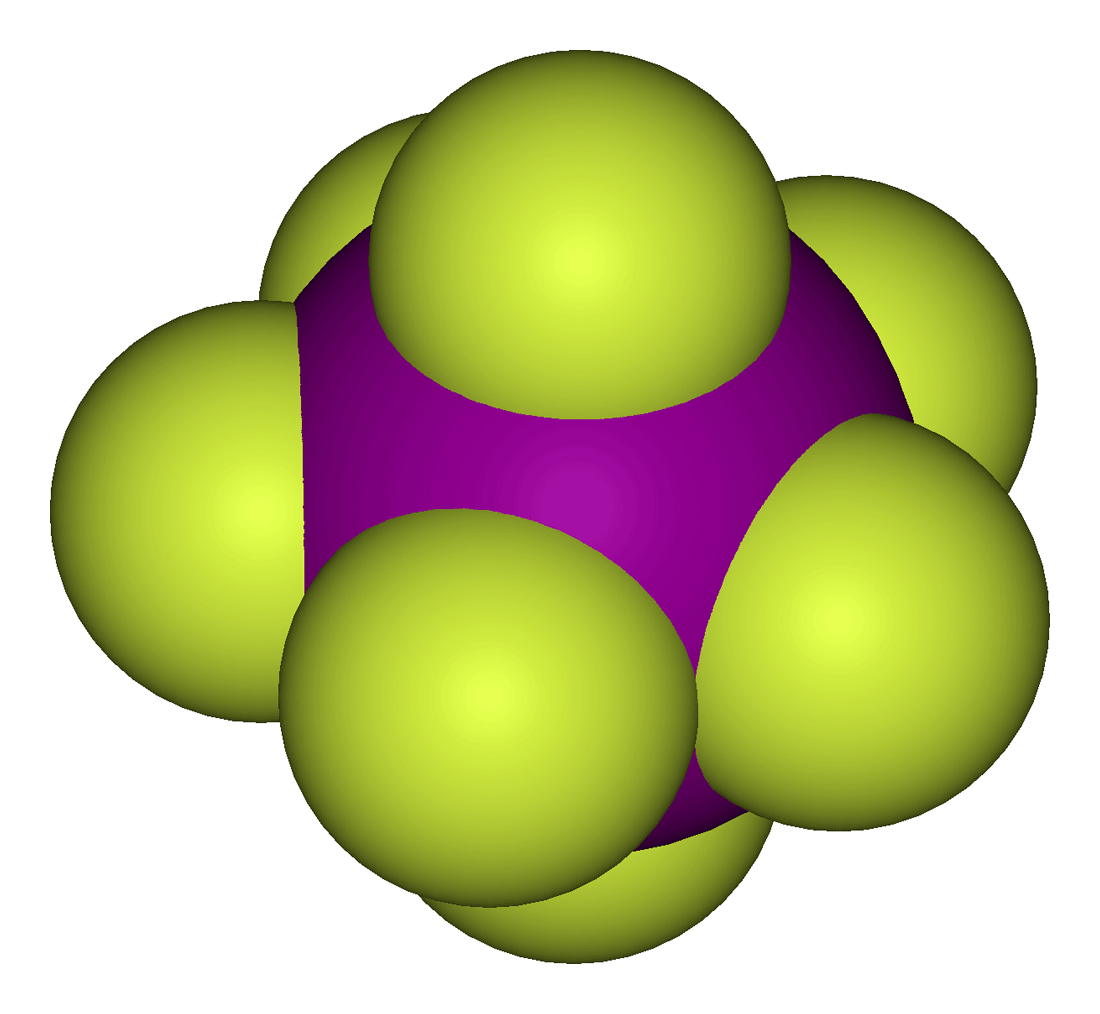
Iodine heptafluoride

- Iodine heptafluoride (IF_{7}) is a colourless gas and a strong fluorinating agent. It is made by reacting iodine pentafluoride with fluorine gas. The molecule is a pentagonal bipyramid. This compound is the only known interhalogen compound where the larger atom is carrying seven of the smaller atoms.
- All attempts to synthesize bromine or chlorine heptafluoride have met with failure; instead, bromine pentafluoride or chlorine pentafluoride is produced, along with fluorine gas.

== Properties ==
Typically, interhalogen bonds are more reactive than diatomic halogen bonds, because interhalogen bonds are weaker than diatomic halogen bonds, except for F_{2}. If interhalogens are exposed to water, they convert to halide and oxyhalide ions. With BrF_{5}, this reaction can be explosive. If interhalogens are exposed to silicon dioxide, or metal oxides, then silicon or metal respectively bond with one of the types of halogen, leaving free diatomic halogens and diatomic oxygen. Most interhalogens are halogen fluorides, and all but three (IBr, AtBr, and AtI) of the remainder are halogen chlorides. Chlorine and bromine can each bond to five fluorine atoms, and iodine can bond to seven. AX and AX_{3} interhalogens can form between two halogens whose electronegativities are relatively close to one another. When interhalogens are exposed to metals, they react to form metal halides of the constituent halogens. The oxidation power of an interhalogen increases with the number of halogens attached to the central atom of the interhalogen, as well as with the decreasing size of the central atom of the compound. Interhalogens containing fluorine are more likely to be volatile than interhalogens containing heavier halogens.

Interhalogens with one or three halogens bonded to a central atom are formed by two elements whose electronegativities are not far apart. Interhalogens with five or seven halogens bonded to a central atom are formed by two elements whose sizes are very different. The number of smaller halogens that can bond to a large central halogen is guided by the ratio of the atomic radius of the larger halogen over the atomic radius of the smaller halogen. A number of interhalogens, such as IF_{7}, react with all metals except for those in the platinum group. IF_{7}, unlike interhalogens in the XY_{5} series, does not react with the fluorides of the alkali metals.

ClF_{3} is the most reactive of the XY_{3} interhalogens. ICl_{3} is the least reactive. BrF_{3} has the highest thermal stability of the interhalogens with four atoms. ICl_{3} has the lowest. Chlorine trifluoride has a boiling point of −12 °C. Bromine trifluoride has a boiling point of 127 °C and is a liquid at room temperature. Iodine trichloride melts at 101 °C.

Most interhalogens are covalent gases. Some interhalogens, especially those containing bromine, are liquids, and most iodine-containing interhalogens are solids. Most of the interhalogens composed of lighter halogens are fairly colorless, but the interhalogens containing heavier halogens are deeper in color due to their higher molecular weight. In this respect, the interhalogens are similar to the halogens. The greater the difference between the electronegativities of the two halogens in an interhalogen, the higher the boiling point of the interhalogen. All interhalogens are diamagnetic. The bond length of interhalogens in the XY series increases with the size of the constituent halogens. For instance, ClF has a bond length of 1.628 Å, and IBr has a bond length of 2.47 Å.

== Production ==
It is possible to produce larger interhalogens, such as ClF_{3}, by exposing smaller interhalogens, such as ClF, to pure diatomic halogens, such as F_{2}. This method of production is especially useful for generating halogen fluorides. At temperatures of 250 to 300 °C, this type of production method can also convert larger interhalogens into smaller ones. It is also possible to produce interhalogens by combining two pure halogens at various conditions. This method can generate any interhalogen save for IF_{7}.

Smaller interhalogens, such as ClF, can form by direct reaction with pure halogens. For instance, F_{2} reacts with Cl_{2} at 250 °C to form two molecules of ClF. Br_{2} reacts with diatomic fluorine in the same way, but at 60 °C. I_{2} reacts with diatomic fluorine at only 35 °C. ClF and BrF can both be produced by the reaction of a larger interhalogen, such as ClF_{3} or BrF_{3} and a diatomic molecule of the element lower in the periodic table. Among the hexatomic interhalogens, IF_{5} has a higher boiling point (97 °C) than BrF_{5} (40.5 °C), although both compounds are liquids at room temperature. The interhalogen IF_{7} can be formed by reacting palladium iodide with fluorine.

== See also ==
- Interchalcogen
- Hydrogen halide

== Bibliography ==
- Greenwood, Norman N.; Earnshaw, Alan (1997). Chemistry of the Elements (2nd ed.). Butterworth-Heinemann. doi:10.1016/C2009-0-30414-6. ISBN 978-0-08-037941-8.
- Kugler, H. K.; Keller, C. (1985). 'At, Astatine', system no. 8a. Gmelin Handbook of Inorganic and Organometallic Chemistry. Vol. 8 (8th ed.). Springer-Verlag. ISBN 3-540-93516-9.
- Zuckerman, J. J.; Hagen, A. P. (1989). Inorganic Reactions and Methods, the Formation of Bonds to Halogens. John Wiley & Sons. ISBN 978-0-471-18656-4.
