= Iodine tribromide =

- Structural formula

Names
- IUPAC name tribromo-λ^{3}-iodane

Identifiers
| CAS Number | 7789-58-4 |
| 3D model (JSmol) | Interactive image |
| ChemSpider | 4359452 |
| ECHA InfoCard | 100.029.251 |
| EC Number | 232-176-1 |
| PubChem CID | 5187573 |
| CompTox Dashboard (EPA) | DTXSID60228506 |
- InChI: InChI=1S/Br3I/c1-4(2)3 Key: FXOJASSPEGUXFT-UHFFFAOYSA-N
- SMILES: BrI(Br)Br

Properties
| Chemical formula | IBr_{3} |
| Molar mass | 366,61 g/mol |
| Appearance | dark brown liquid |

Hazards
- GHS labelling
| Pictograms | (GHS05: Corrosive) |
| Signal word | Danger |
| Hazard statements | H314 |
| Precautionary statements | P260, P264, P280, P301+P330+P331, P303+P361+P353, P304+P340, P305+P351+P338, P310, P321, P363, P405, P501 |
- Except where otherwise noted, data are given for materials in their standard state (at 25 °C [77 °F], 100 kPa). Infobox references

Iodine tribromide is an interhalogen with chemical formula IBr_{3}.

== Properties ==
Iodine tribromide is a dark brown liquid that is miscible with ethanol and ethers.

== Uses ==
Iodine tribromide can be used as a brominated flame retardant when producing semiconductors. It also can be used in dry etching.
