= Iodine trifluoride =

- Structural formula

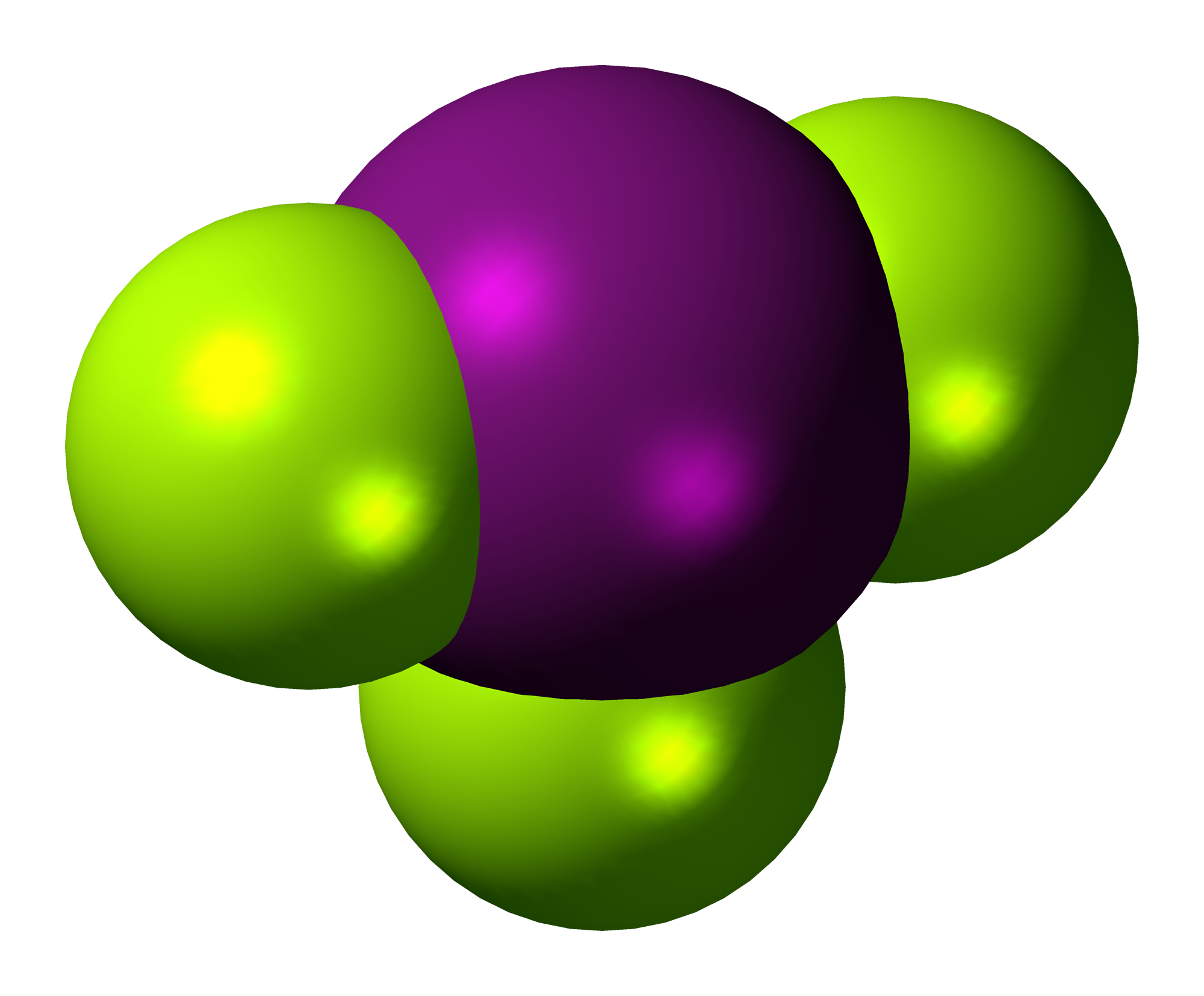

Names
- IUPAC name Iodine trifluoride
- Other names iodine(III) fluoride

Identifiers
CAS Number	22520-96-3
3D model (JSmol)	Interactive image
ChemSpider	10329096
PubChem CID	13932268
CompTox Dashboard (EPA)	DTXSID70552824
- InChI: InChI=1S/F3I/c1-4(2)3 Key: VJUJMLSNVYZCDT-UHFFFAOYSA-N; InChI=1/F3I/c1-4(2)3 Key: VJUJMLSNVYZCDT-UHFFFAOYAM
- SMILES: FI(F)F

Properties
Chemical formula	IF_{3}
Molar mass	183.9 g/mol
Appearance	yellow solid
Melting point	decomposes above −28 °C

Related compounds
Other anions	iodine trichloride
Other cations	bromine trifluoride
Related compounds	chlorine trifluoride iodine pentafluoride
- Except where otherwise noted, data are given for materials in their standard state (at 25 °C [77 °F], 100 kPa). verify (what is ?) Infobox references

Iodine trifluoride is an interhalogen compound with the chemical formula IF_{3}. It is a yellow solid which decomposes above −28 °C. It can be synthesised from the elements, but care must be taken to avoid the formation of IF_{5}.

== Reactions ==
F_{2} reacts with I_{2} to yield IF_{3} at −45 °C in CCl_{3}F. Alternatively, at low temperatures, the fluorination reaction I_{2} + 3XeF_{2} → 2IF_{3} + 3Xe can be used. Not much is known about iodine trifluoride as it is so unstable.

== Structure ==
The iodine atom of iodine trifluoride has five electron pairs, of which two are lone-pairs, and the molecule is T-shaped as predicted by VSEPR Theory.
