= Iodine monobromide =

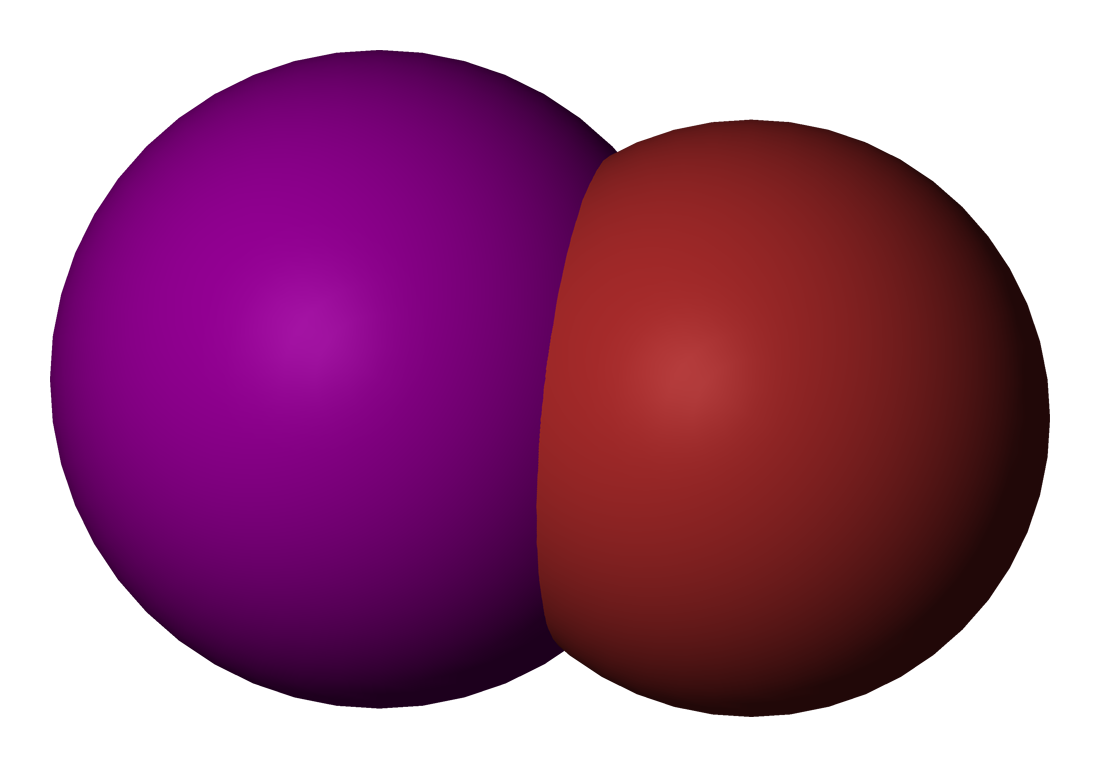

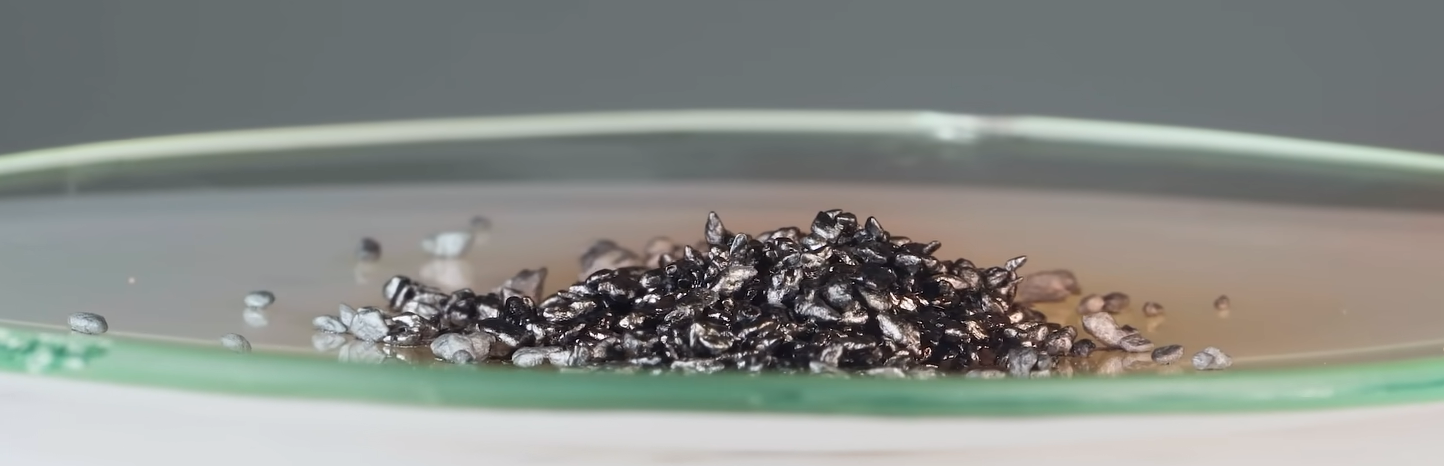

Names
- IUPAC name Iodine monobromide
- Other names Iodine bromide

Identifiers
CAS Number	7789-33-5
3D model (JSmol)	Interactive image
ChemSpider	74216
ECHA InfoCard	100.029.236
PubChem CID	82238
UNII	G0K622RD9N
CompTox Dashboard (EPA)	DTXSID2064862
- InChI: InChI=1S/BrI/c1-2 Key: CBEQRNSPHCCXSH-UHFFFAOYSA-N; InChI=1/BrI/c1-2 Key: CBEQRNSPHCCXSH-UHFFFAOYAO
- SMILES: BrI

Properties
Chemical formula	IBr
Molar mass	206.904 g/mol
Appearance	dark red solid
Melting point	42 °C (108 °F; 315 K)
Boiling point	116 °C (241 °F; 389 K)

Related compounds
Other anions	iodine monochloride, iodine monofluoride
Related interhalogen compounds	Iodine monochloride Iodine monofluoride Bromine monochloride
- Except where otherwise noted, data are given for materials in their standard state (at 25 °C [77 °F], 100 kPa). verify (what is ?) Infobox references

Iodine monobromide is an interhalogen compound with the formula IBr. It is a dark red solid that melts near room temperature. Like iodine monochloride, IBr is used in some types of iodometry. It serves as a source of I^{+}. Its Lewis acid properties are compared with those of ICl and I_{2} in the ECW model. It can form CT adducts with Lewis donors.

Iodine monobromide is formed when iodine and bromine are combined in a chemical reaction:

I_{2} + Br_{2} → 2 IBr
