= Chlorine pentafluoride =

Chemical compound

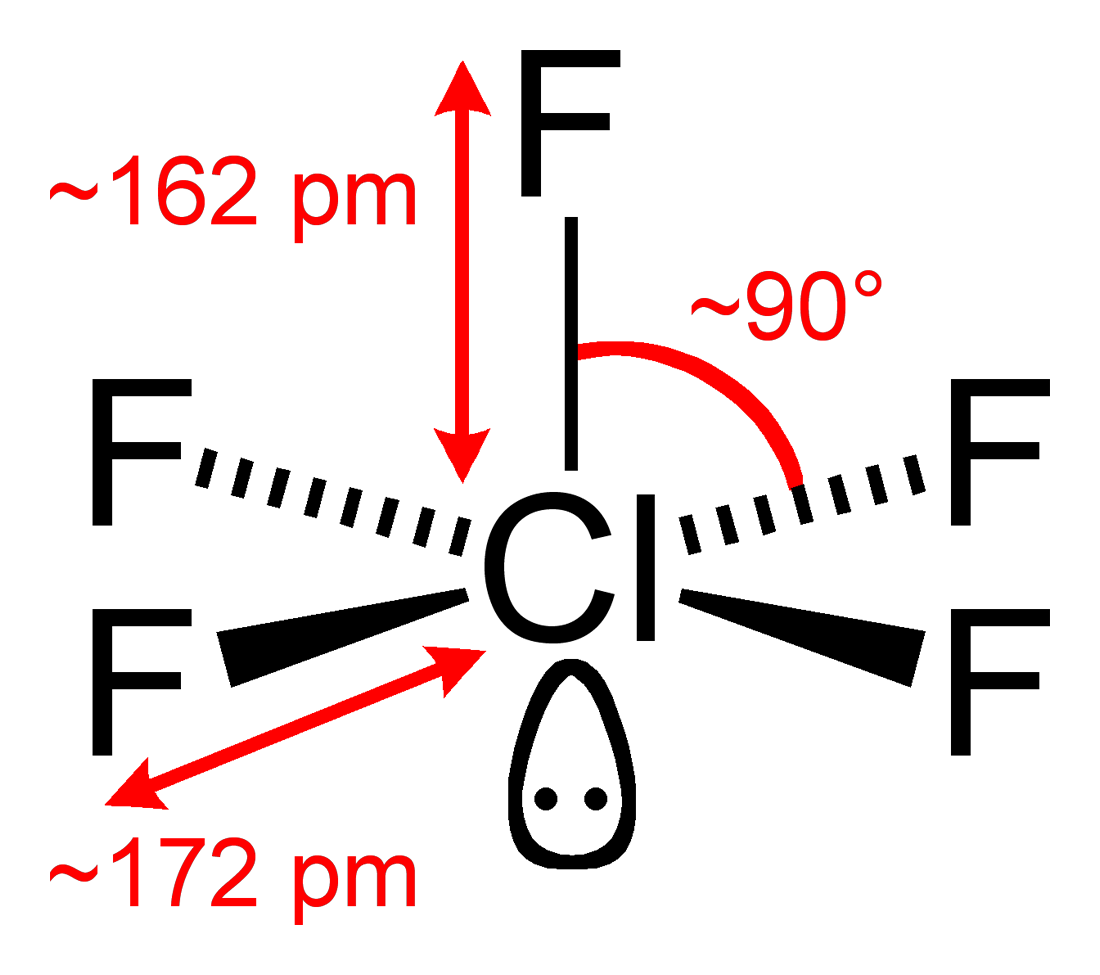

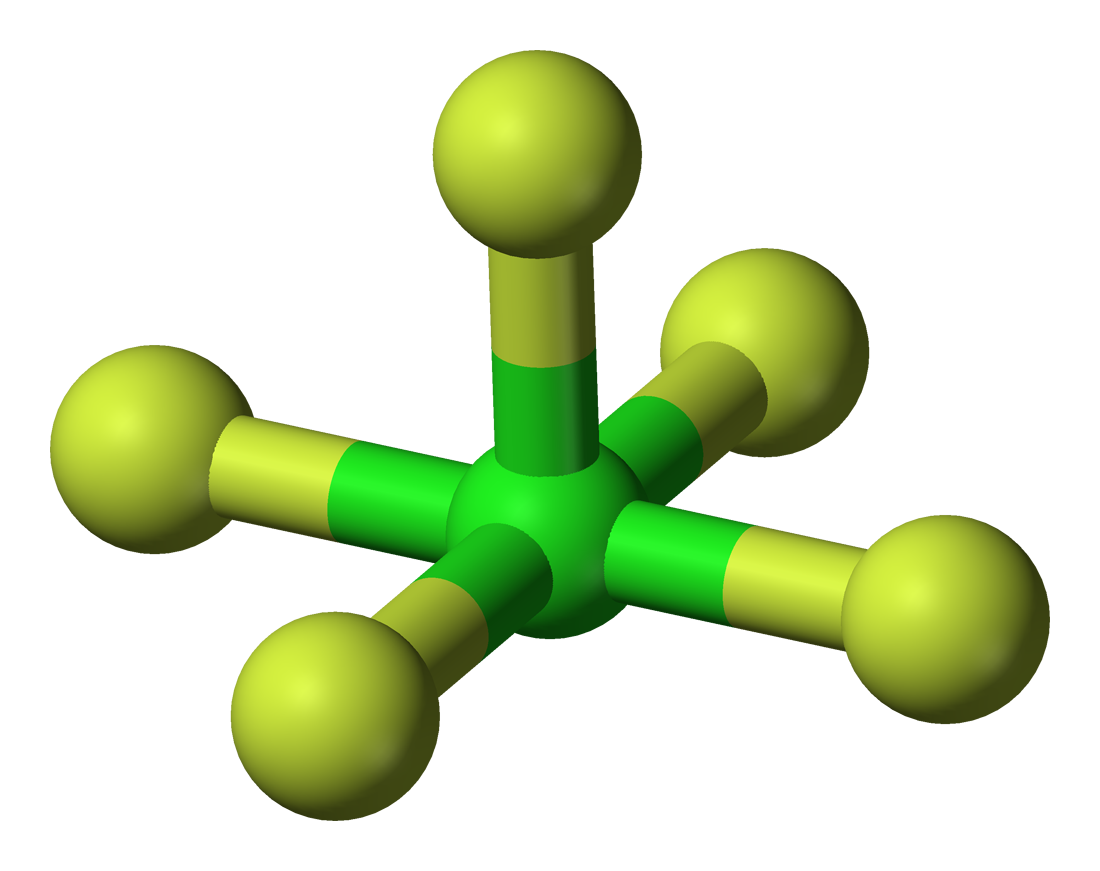

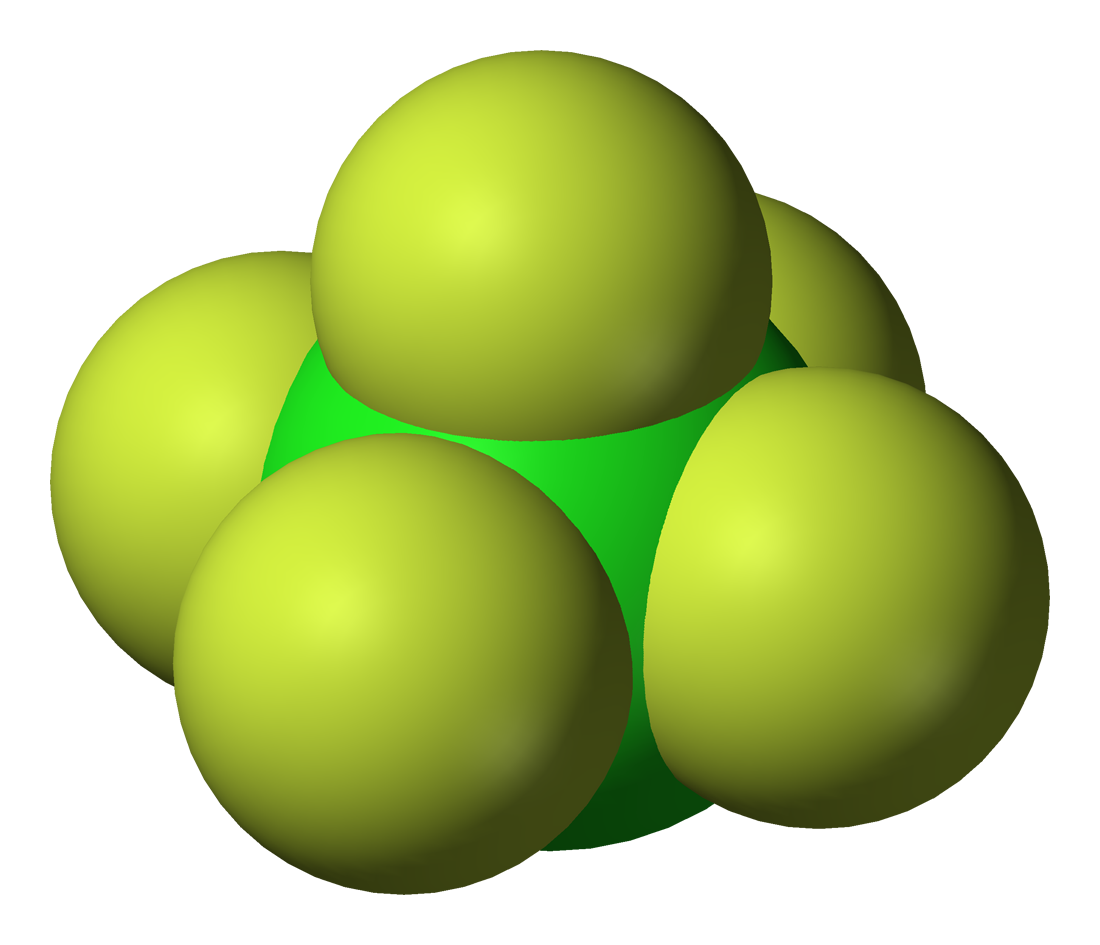

Identifiers
CAS Number	13637-63-3
3D model (JSmol)	Interactive image
ChemSpider	55559
ECHA InfoCard	100.033.734
PubChem CID	61654
RTECS number	FO2975000
UNII	O4RJ1HW01H
CompTox Dashboard (EPA)	DTXSID90894056
- InChI: InChI=1S/ClF5/c2-1(3,4,5)6 Key: KNSWNNXPAWSACI-UHFFFAOYSA-N
- SMILES: FCl(F)(F)(F)F

Properties
Chemical formula	ClF_{5}
Molar mass	130.445 g/mol
Appearance	colorless gas
Odor	sweet
Density	4.5 kg/m^{3} (g/L)
Melting point	−103 °C (−153 °F; 170 K)
Boiling point	−13.1 °C (8.4 °F; 260.0 K)
Solubility in water	Hydrolyzes

Structure
Molecular shape	Square pyramidal

Thermochemistry
Std molar entropy (S^{⦵}_{298})	310.73 J/(mol·K)
Std enthalpy of formation (Δ_{f}H^{⦵}_{298})	−238.49 kJ/mol

Hazards
- Occupational safety and health (OHS/OSH)
Main hazards	Fatal if inhaled. Causes permanent blindness and severe skin and respiratory tract burns.
- GHS labelling
Pictograms	(GHS03: Oxidizing) (GHS04: Compressed Gas) (GHS05: Corrosive) (GHS06: Toxic)
Signal word	Danger
Hazard statements	H270, H280, H314, H330
Precautionary statements	P220, P244, P260, P264, P271, P280, P284, P301+P330+P331, P302+P361+P354, P304+P340, P305+P354+P338, P316, P320, P321, P363, P370+P376, P403, P403+P233, P405, P410+P403, P501
- Except where otherwise noted, data are given for materials in their standard state (at 25 °C [77 °F], 100 kPa). verify (what is ?) Infobox references

Chlorine pentafluoride is an interhalogen compound with formula ClF_{5}. This colourless gas is a strong oxidant that was once a candidate oxidizer for rockets. The molecule adopts a square pyramidal structure with C_{4v} symmetry, as confirmed by its high-resolution ^{19}F NMR spectrum. It was first synthesized in 1963.

== Preparation ==
Some of the earliest research on the preparation was classified. It was first prepared by fluorination of chlorine trifluoride at high temperatures and high pressures:

ClF_{3} + F_{2} → ClF_{5}
ClF + 2 F_{2} → ClF_{5}
Cl_{2} + 5 F_{2} → 2 ClF_{5}
Cs[ClF_{4}] + F_{2} → CsF + ClF_{5}

NiF_{2} catalyzes this reaction.

Certain metal fluorides, M^{+}[ClF_{4}]^{−}, e.g. K^{+}[ClF_{4}]^{−} (potassium tetrafluorochlorate(III)), Rb^{+}[ClF_{4}]^{−} (rubidium tetrafluorochlorate(III)), Cs^{+}[ClF_{4}]^{−} (caesium tetrafluorochlorate(III)), react with F_{2} to produce ClF_{5} and the corresponding alkali metal fluoride.

== Reactions ==
In a highly exothermic reaction, ClF_{5} reacts with water to produce chloryl fluoride and hydrogen fluoride:

ClF_{5} + 2 H_{2}O → ClO_{2}F + 4 HF

It is also a strong fluorinating agent. At room temperature it reacts readily with all elements (including otherwise "inert" elements like platinum and gold) except noble gases, nitrogen, oxygen and fluorine.

== Uses ==
=== Rocket propellant ===
Chlorine pentafluoride was once considered for use as an oxidizer for rockets. As a propellant, it has a higher maximum specific impulse than ClF_{3}, but with the same difficulties in handling. Due to the hazardous nature of chlorine pentafluoride and the large amounts of hydrogen fluoride in the exhaust, it has yet to be used in a large scale rocket propulsion system.

== Safety ==
Chlorine pentafluoride is highly toxic. It is a strong irritant to skin, eyes and mucous membranes. It is very corrosive. Causes severe and painful skin, eye and respiratory tract burns. May cause lung damage, toxic pneumonitis and permanent blindness. It is fatal if inhaled or absorbed through skin. Containers with chlorine pentafluoride may explode when heated. Ruptured cylinders may rocket violently. Chlorine pentafluoride causes other symptoms like nausea, vomiting and dyspnea.

Chlorine pentafluoride reacts violently with water or moisture in the air and even water ice at −100 °C (−148 °F) (to produce corrosive hydrofluoric acid and toxic chlorine gas), nitric acid (even at −100 °C), metals and organic materials. It is a strong oxidizer. It does not burn, but supports burning. On catching fire or heated to decomposition, it emits corrosive and very toxic gases. Vapors from liquefied gas are initially heavier than air and spread along the floor. These are strong oxidizers and will react vigorously or explosively with many materials including fuels. May ignite flammable materials (wood, paper, oil, clothing, etc.).

== See also ==
- Chlorine trifluoride
- Hypervalent molecule
