= Square pyramidal molecular geometry =

Shape of certain five-ligand chemical complexes

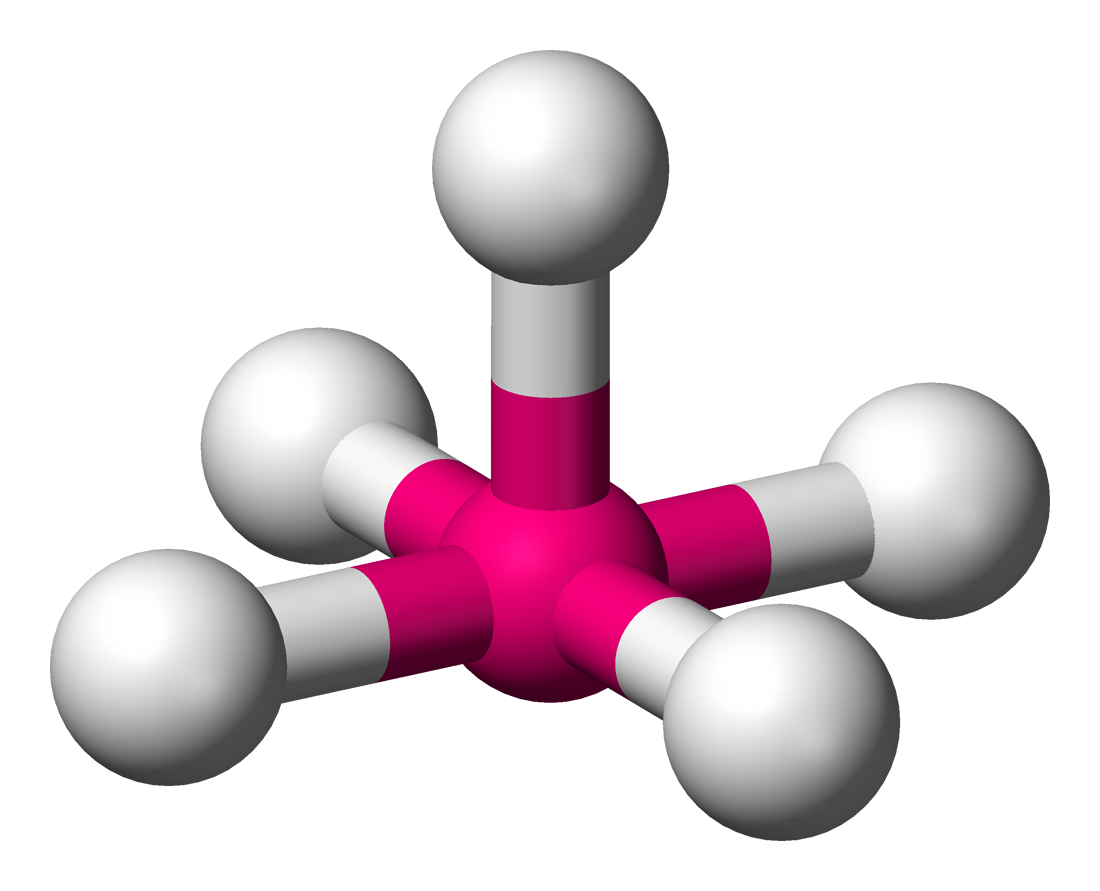
- Examples: ClF_{5}, MnCl^{2−}_{5}, XeOF_{4}
- Point group: C_{4v}
- Coordination number: 5

Square pyramid geometry describes the shape of certain chemical compounds with the formula ML_{5} where L is a ligand. If the ligand atoms were connected, the resulting shape would be that of a pyramid with a square base. The point group symmetry involved is of type C_{4v}. The geometry is common for certain main group compounds that have a stereochemically-active lone pair, as described by VSEPR theory. Certain compounds crystallize in both the trigonal bipyramidal and the square pyramidal structures, notably [Ni(CN)_{5}]^{3−}.

== As a transition state in Berry pseudorotation ==
As a trigonal bipyramidal molecule undergoes Berry pseudorotation, it proceeds via an intermediary stage with the square pyramidal geometry. Thus even though the geometry is rarely seen as the ground state, it is accessed by a low energy distortion from a trigonal bipyramid.

Pseudorotation also occurs in square pyramidal molecules. Molecules with this geometry, as opposed to trigonal bipyramidal, exhibit heavier vibration. The mechanism used is similar to the Berry mechanism.

== Examples ==
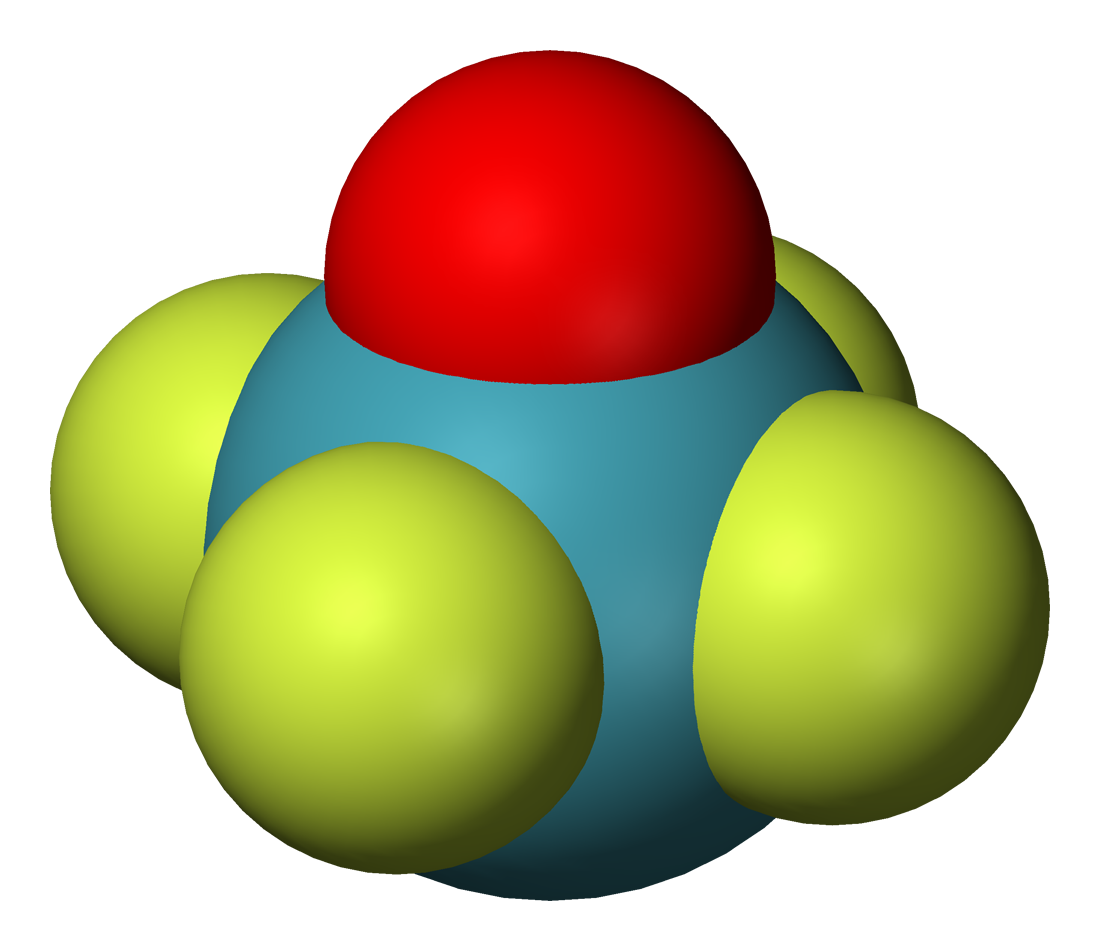
Structure of xenon oxytetrafluoride, an example of a molecule with the square pyramidal coordination geometry.

Some molecular compounds that adopt square pyramidal geometry are XeOF_{4}, and various halogen pentafluorides (XF_{5}, where X = Cl, Br, I). Complexes of vanadium(IV), such as vanadyl acetylacetonate, [VO(acac)_{2}], are square pyramidal (acac = acetylacetonate, the deprotonated anion of acetylacetone (2,4-pentanedione)).

== See also ==
- AXE method
- Square pyramid
- Hypervalent molecule
- Molecular geometry
