= Bromine monofluoride =

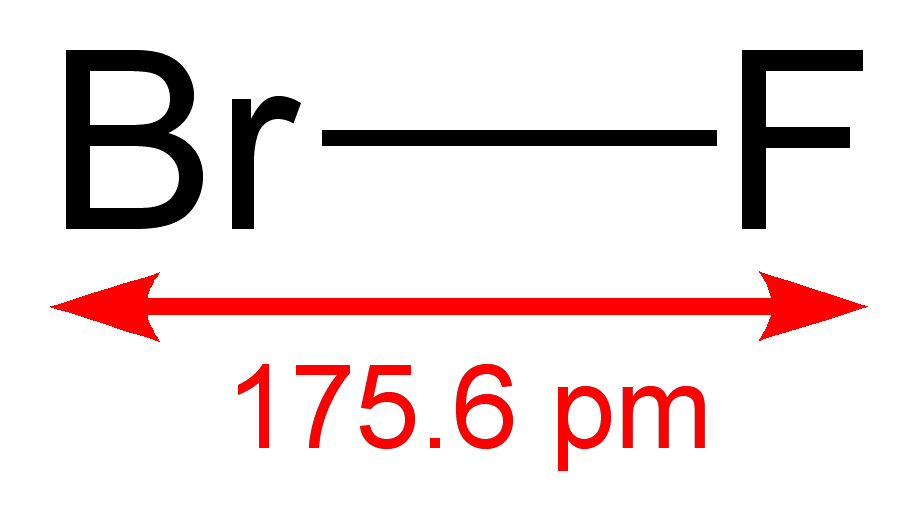

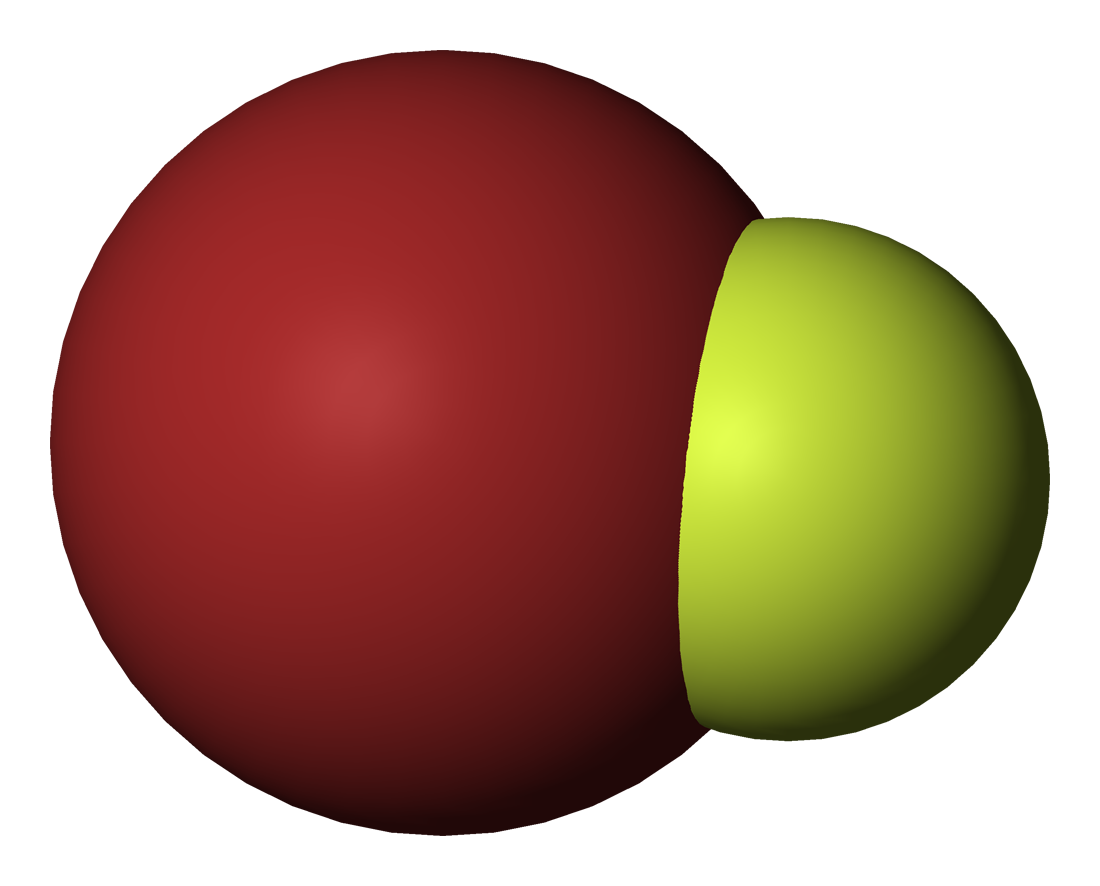

Names
- IUPAC name Bromine monofluoride

Identifiers
CAS Number	13863-59-7
3D model (JSmol)	Interactive image
ChemSpider	20474212
PubChem CID	139632
UN number	1745
CompTox Dashboard (EPA)	DTXSID60160735
- InChI: InChI=1S/BrF/c1-2 Key: MZJUGRUTVANEDW-UHFFFAOYSA-N
- SMILES: FBr

Properties
Chemical formula	BrF
Molar mass	98.903 g/mol
Density	4.403 g/L
Melting point	−33 °C (−27 °F; 240 K)
Boiling point	20 °C (68 °F; 293 K) (decomposes)
- Except where otherwise noted, data are given for materials in their standard state (at 25 °C [77 °F], 100 kPa). Infobox references

Bromine monofluoride is a quite unstable interhalogen compound with the chemical formula BrF. It can be produced through the reaction of bromine trifluoride (or bromine pentafluoride) and bromine. Due to its lability, the compound can be detected but not isolated:

BrF_{3} + Br_{2} → 3 BrF
BrF_{5} + 2 Br_{2} → 5 BrF
Br_{2(l)} + F_{2(g)} → 2 BrF_{(g)}

It is usually generated in the presence of caesium fluoride.

Bromine monofluoride decomposes at normal temperature through dismutation to bromine trifluoride, bromine pentafluoride, and free bromine.

The molecular structure in the gas phase was determined by microwave spectroscopy; the bond length is r_{e} = 1.758981(50) Å.

The bond length in a cocrystal with methylchloride is 1.822(2) Å; the lengthening relative to the free molecule is due to an interaction of the type F-Br···ClMe with a distance of 2.640(1) Å.

== See also ==
- Bromine trifluoride, BrF_{3}
- Bromine pentafluoride, BrF_{5}
