= Iodine monochloride =

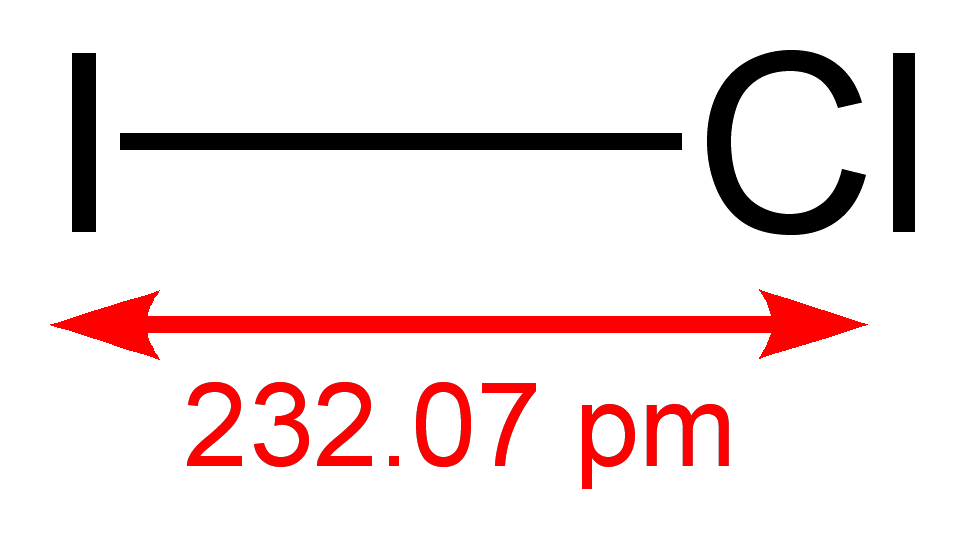
I-Cl bond length = 232.07 pm
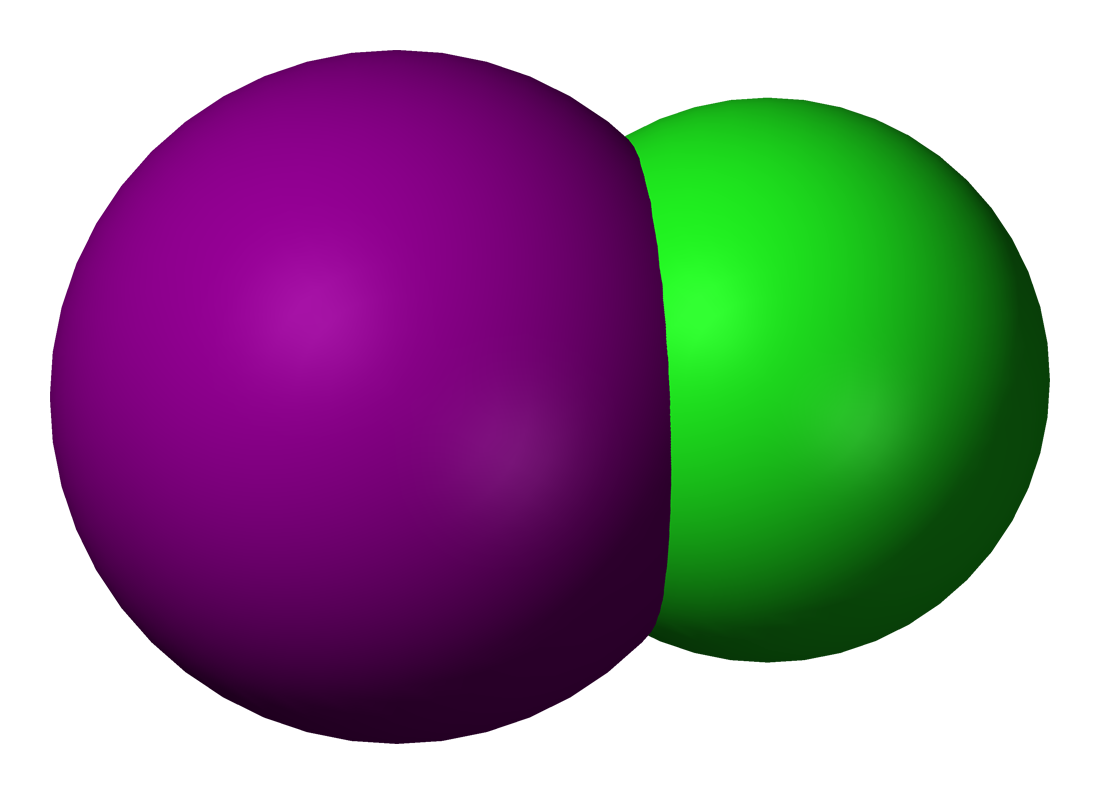
Space-filling model
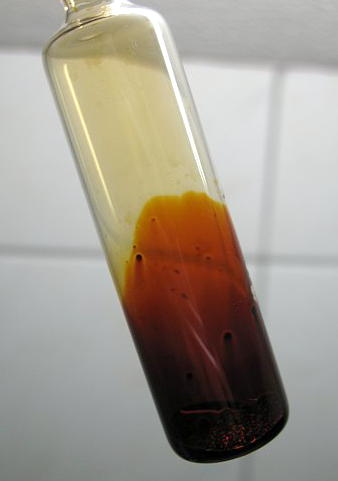
- A sample of Iodine monochloride reagent

Names
- Preferred IUPAC name Iodine monochloride Iodine(I) chloride
- Systematic IUPAC name Chloroiodane
- Other names Iodine chloride

Identifiers
CAS Number	7790-99-0
3D model (JSmol)	Interactive image
ChemSpider	23042
ECHA InfoCard	100.029.306
EC Number	232-236-7
MeSH	Iodine-monochloride
PubChem CID	24640
UNII	0SMG5NLU45
UN number	1792
CompTox Dashboard (EPA)	DTXSID1064879
- InChI: InChI=1S/ClI/c1-2 Key: QZRGKCOWNLSUDK-UHFFFAOYSA-N; InChI=1S/ClI/c1-2 Key: QZRGKCOWNLSUDK-UHFFFAOYSA-N; InChI=1/ClI/c1-2 Key: QZRGKCOWNLSUDK-UHFFFAOYAO
- SMILES: ClI

Properties
Chemical formula	ICl
Molar mass	162.35 g/mol
Appearance	reddish-brown
Density	3.10 g/cm^{3}
Melting point	27.2 °C (81.0 °F; 300.3 K) (α-form); 13.9 °C (β-form)
Boiling point	97.4 °C (207.3 °F; 370.5 K)
Solubility in water	Hydrolyzes
Solubility	soluble in CS_{2} acetic acid pyridine alcohol, ether, HCl
Magnetic susceptibility (χ)	−54.6×10^{−6} cm^{3}/mol

Hazards
- Occupational safety and health (OHS/OSH)
Main hazards	Corrosive, reacts with water to release HCl
Safety data sheet (SDS)	https://chemicalsafety.com/sds1/sdsviewer.php?id=30683304

Related compounds
Related interhalogen compounds	Chlorine monofluoride Bromine monochloride Iodine monobromide
- Except where otherwise noted, data are given for materials in their standard state (at 25 °C [77 °F], 100 kPa). verify (what is ?) Infobox references

Iodine monochloride is an interhalogen compound with the formula ICl. It is a red-brown chemical compound that melts near room temperature. These characteristics are so similar to those of bromine that Justus von Liebig mistook ICl for bromine. Because of the difference in the electronegativity of iodine and chlorine, this molecule is highly polar and behaves as a source of I^{+}. Discovered in 1814 by Gay-Lussac, iodine monochloride is the first interhalogen compound discovered.

== Preparation ==
Iodine monochloride is produced simply by combining the halogens in a 1:1 molar ratio, according to the equation

I_{2} + Cl_{2} → 2 ICl

When chlorine gas is passed through iodine crystals, one observes the brown vapor of iodine monochloride. Dark brown iodine monochloride liquid is collected. Excess chlorine converts iodine monochloride into iodine trichloride in a reversible reaction:

ICl + Cl_{2} ⇌ ICl_{3}

== Polymorphs ==
ICl has two polymorphs; α-ICl, which exists as black needles (red by transmitted light) with a melting point of 27.2 °C, and β-ICl, which exists as black platelets (red-brown by transmitted light) with a melting point 13.9 °C.

In the crystal structures of both polymorphs the molecules are arranged in zigzag chains. β-ICl is monoclinic with the space group P2_{1}/c.

== Reactions and uses ==
Iodine monochloride is soluble in acids such as HF and HCl but reacts with pure water to form HCl, HI, iodine, and iodic acid:

2 ICl + 2 H_{2}O → 2 HCl + 2 HI + O_{2}
4 ICl + 2 H_{2}O → 4 HCl + 2 I_{2} + O_{2}
5 ICl + 3 H_{2}O → 5 HCl + HIO_{3} + 2 I_{2}

ICl is a useful reagent in organic synthesis. It is used as a source of electrophilic iodine in the synthesis of certain aromatic iodides. It also cleaves C–Si bonds.

ICl will also add to the double bond in alkenes to give chloro-iodo alkanes.

RCH=CHR′ + ICl → RCH(I)–CH(Cl)R′

When such reactions are conducted in the presence of sodium azide, the iodo-azide RCH(I)–CH(N_{3})R′ is obtained.

The Wijs solution, iodine monochloride dissolved in acetic acid, is used to determine the iodine value of a substance.

It can also be used to prepare iodates, by reaction with a chlorate. Chlorine is released as a byproduct.

Iodine monochloride is a Lewis acid that forms 1:1 adducts with Lewis bases such as dimethylacetamide and benzene.
