= Bromine monochloride =

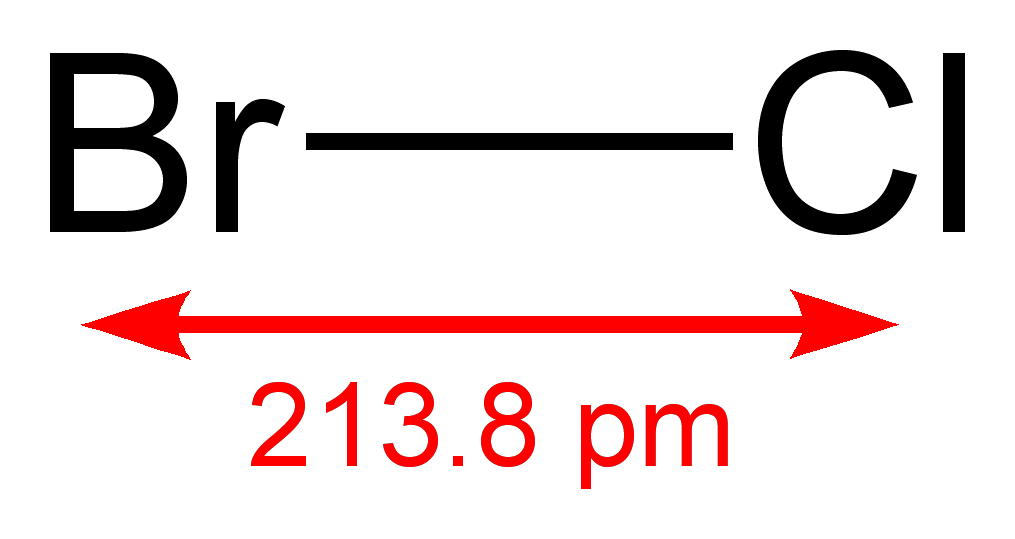
- structural diagram

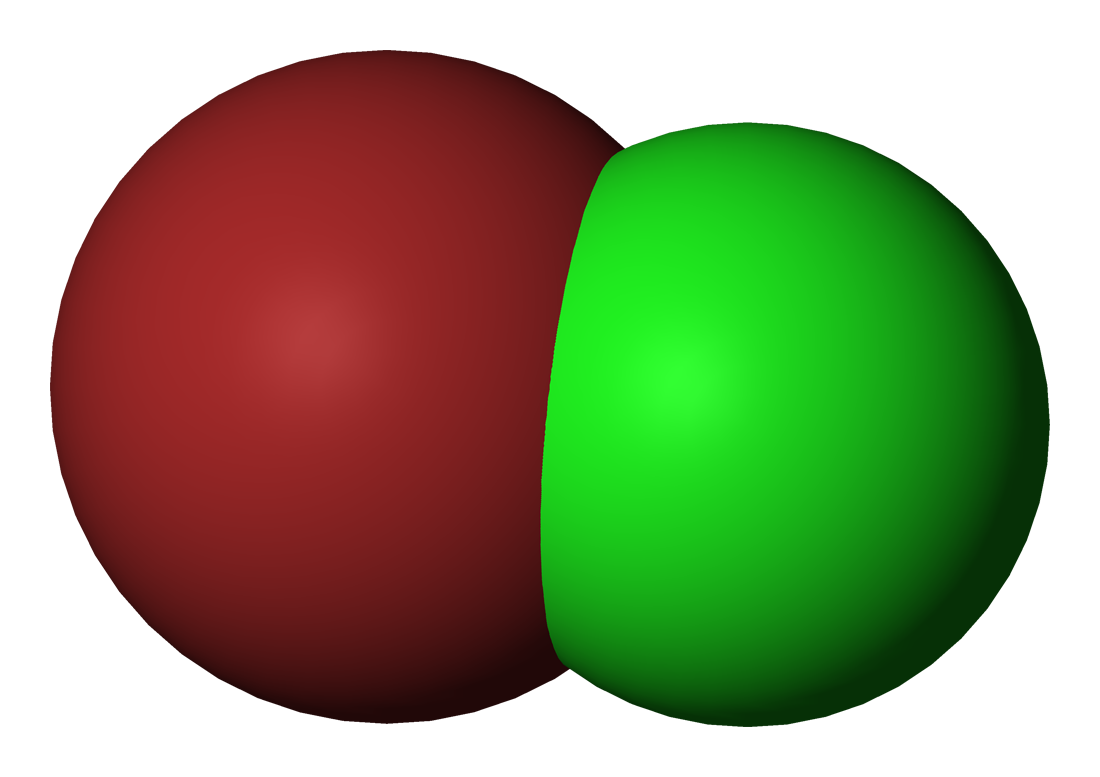
- space-filling molecular model

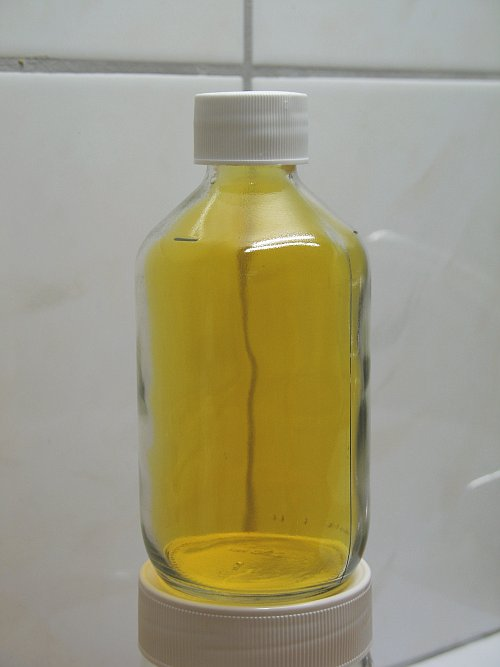

Names
- Other names bromine(I) chloride bromochloride bromine chloride

Identifiers
| CAS Number | 13863-41-7 |
| 3D model (JSmol) | Interactive image |
| ChemSpider | 55600 |
| ECHA InfoCard | 100.034.169 |
| EC Number | 237-601-4 |
| PubChem CID | 61697 |
| RTECS number | EF9200000 |
| UNII | 7G62XY5724 |
| UN number | 2901 |
| CompTox Dashboard (EPA) | DTXSID4035259 |
- InChI: InChI=1S/BrCl/c1-2 Key: CODNYICXDISAEA-UHFFFAOYSA-N; InChI=1/BrCl/c1-2 Key: CODNYICXDISAEA-UHFFFAOYAZ
- SMILES: BrCl

Properties
| Chemical formula | BrCl |
| Molar mass | 115.357 g/mol |
| Appearance | golden yellow gas |
| Density | 2.172 g/cm^{3} |
| Melting point | −54 °C (−65 °F; 219 K) |
| Boiling point | 5 °C (41 °F; 278 K) |
| Solubility in water | 8.5 g/L |

Hazards
| NFPA 704 (fire diamond) | 3 0 2 OX |
- Except where otherwise noted, data are given for materials in their standard state (at 25 °C [77 °F], 100 kPa). verify (what is ?) Infobox references

Bromine monochloride, also called bromine(I) chloride, bromochloride, and bromine chloride, is an interhalogen inorganic compound with chemical formula BrCl. It is a very reactive golden yellow gas with boiling point 5 °C and melting point −66 °C. Its CAS number is 13863-41-7, and its EINECS number is 237-601-4. It is a strong oxidizing agent. Its molecular structure in the gas phase was determined by microwave spectroscopy; the Br-Cl bond has a length of r_{e} = 2.1360376(18) Å. Its crystal structure was determined by single crystal X-ray diffraction; the bond length in the solid state is 2.179(2) Å and the shortest intermolecular interaction is r(Cl···Br) = 3.145(2) Å.

== Uses ==
Bromine monochloride is used in analytical chemistry in determining low levels of mercury, to quantitatively oxidize mercury in the sample to Hg(II) state.

A common use of bromine monochloride is as an algaecide, fungicide, and disinfectant of industrial recirculating cooling water systems.

Addition of bromine monochloride is used in some types of Li-SO_{2} batteries to increase voltage and energy density.

== See also ==
- List of highly toxic gases
- Interhalogen compounds
