= Augmented triangular prism =

Triangular prism attached by a square pyramid

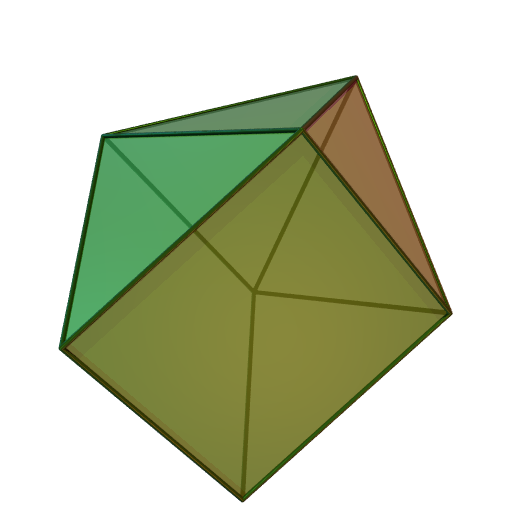
- Type: Johnson; J_{48} – J_{49} – J_{50}
- Faces: 6 triangles 2 squares
- Edges: 13
- Vertices: 7
- Vertex configuration: $$\begin{align} &2 \times (3 \times 4^2) \, + \\ &1 \times (3^4) \, + \\ &4 \times (3^3 \times 4) \end{align}$$
- Symmetry group: $C_{2\mathrm{v}}$
- Dihedral angle (degrees): triangle-triangle: 109.5°, 144.7° triangle-square: 90°, 114.7° square-square: 60°
- Properties: convex, composite

Net
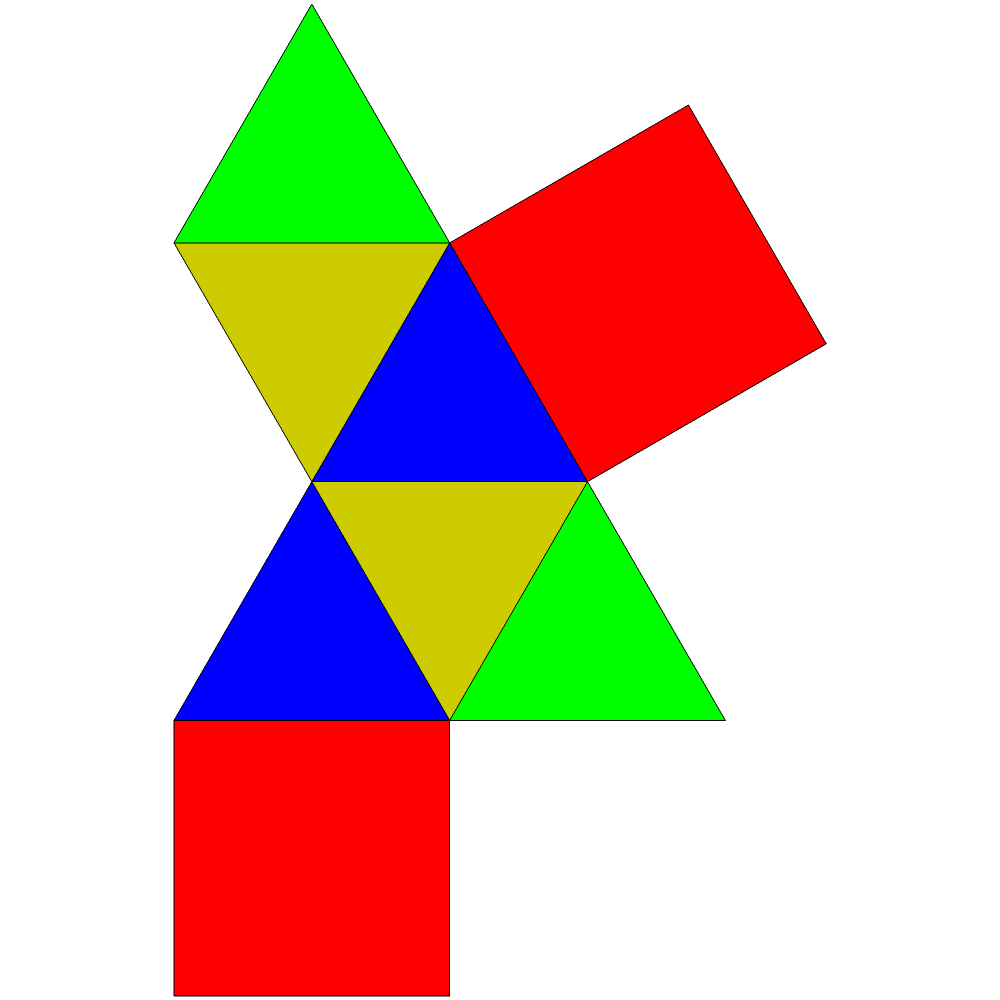

In geometry, the augmented triangular prism is a polyhedron constructed by attaching an equilateral square pyramid onto one of the square faces of a triangular prism. As a result, it is an example of a Johnson solid. It appears in chemistry as the capped trigonal prismatic molecular geometry.

== Construction ==
The augmented triangular prism is a polyhedron that can be constructed from a triangular prism by attaching an equilateral square pyramid to one of its square faces, a process known as augmentation. This square pyramid covers the square face of the prism, so the resulting polyhedron has six equilateral triangles and two squares as its faces. A convex polyhedron whose faces are all regular polygons, but which is not uniform, is a Johnson solid, named after American mathematician Norman W. Johnson who listed the 92 such polyhedra. The augmented triangular prism is among them, enumerated as the forty-ninth Johnson solid $J_{49}$.

Related to the aforementioned construction, the augmented triangular prism is a composite polyhedron. A polyhedron is said to be composite if, when being sliced by a plane, the pieces result in two or more convex polyhedra with regular polygonal faces. The augmented triangular prism can be sliced into one equilateral square pyramid and a triangular prism; these are non-composite or elementary polyhedra.

== Properties ==
The surface area of an augmented triangular prism is obtained by adding the area of six equilateral triangles and two squares: $A = 6T + 2S$. The area of an equilateral triangle and of a square are $T = \frac{\sqrt{3}}{4}a^2$ and $S = a^2$, respectively, where $a$ is the edge length. All augmented triangular prism edges are equal in length. The augmented triangular prism's surface area is then:
$$A = 6\left( \frac{\sqrt{3}}{4}a^2\right) + 2a^2 = \frac{3\sqrt{3} + 4}{2}a^2 \approx 4.598a^2.$$
The volume $V$ of the augmented triangular prism is obtained by slicing it into a triangular prism and an equilateral square pyramid, and adding their volumes. The volumes of a triangular prism and pyramid are $\frac{\sqrt{3}}{4}a^3$ and $\frac{\sqrt{2}}{6}a^3$, respectively. Therefore, the volume of an augmented triangular prism is:
$$V = \frac{\sqrt{3}}{4}a^3 + \frac{\sqrt{2}}{6}a^3 = \frac{3\sqrt{3} + 2\sqrt{2}}{12}a^3 \approx 0.669a^3.$$

3D model of an augmented triangular prism

An augmented triangular prism has three-dimensional symmetry group $C_{2\mathrm{v}}$ of order four. That is, there are four rigid transformations that map the shape onto itself. These are:

- The do-nothing transformation;
- Rotation of 180°, about a line through the pyramid's apex and the midpoint of the opposite side;
- Reflection through the plane that contains that line, and which is parallel to the prism's triangular faces; and
- The composition of the rotation and reflection.

The dihedral angles of an augmented triangular prism (i.e., the angle between two polygonal faces) can be calculated by examining the prism and the pyramid separately, and adding when appropriate:

- The dihedral angle between two adjacent triangles in the pyramid is $\arccos \left(-1/3 \right) \approx 109.5^\circ$.
- The dihedral angle two adjacent squares is the interior angle of a triangular prism, $\pi/3 = 60^\circ$.
- The dihedral angle between a square and a triangle that comes from the prism is $\pi/2 = 90^\circ$.
- The dihedral angle between a square and one of the pyramid's triangles is the sum of the dihedral angle between two square faces in the prism, and the dihedral angle between the square face of the pyramid and one of its triangular faces. The latter angle is $\arctan \left(\sqrt{2}\right) \approx 54.7^\circ$, so angle in the augmented triangular prism is $\pi/3+\arctan(\sqrt{2})\approx114.735^\circ$.
- The dihedral angle between a triangle from the prism and a triangle from the pyramid is the sum of the dihedral angle between a triangle and square in the prism, and a triangle and a square in the pyramid. This is $\pi/2+\arctan(\sqrt{2})\approx144.735^\circ$.

== Application ==
In the geometry of chemical compounds, a polyhedron may commonly be visualized as an atom cluster surrounding a central atom. The capped trigonal prismatic molecular geometry describes clusters for which this polyhedron is an augmented triangular prism. An example of such compound is the potassium heptafluorotantalate.
