= Organoantimony-based Lewis acids =

Organoantimony-based Lewis acids are organoantimony compounds that exhibit the property of Lewis acidity. The high Lewis acidity of antimony pentafluoride has long been known, one consequence of which are non-coordinating anions (SbF^{−}_{6} and Sb_{2}F^{−}_{11}). Another consequence is the use of SbF_{5} to produce superacids (magic acids, fluoroantimonic acid). It follows that the behavior of SbF_{5} could be replicated with organoantimony compounds. Some related compounds, including antimony(III) derivatives, also display Lewis acidity.

== Origin of acidity ==
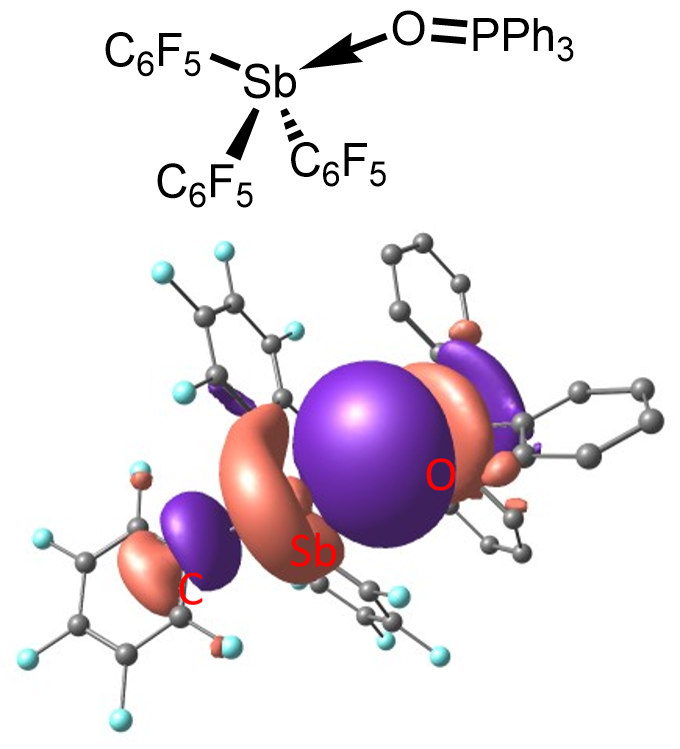
NBO of Sb(C_{6}F_{5})_{3}-P(O)Ph_{3} adduct describing donor–acceptor interaction between lp(O) and σ*(Sb-C_{6}F_{5}).

In general members of pnictogen group Lewis acidic compounds, Lewis-acidic antimony compounds have been investigated to extend the isolobal analogy between the vacant p orbital of borane and σ*(Sb–X) orbitals of stiborane, and the similar electronegativities of antimony (2.05) and boron (2.04).

The unoccupied σ*(Sb–X) orbital contributes to the Lewis acidity of antimony compounds in two ways: donor–acceptor orbital interaction and electrostatic interaction. These two contributions to the Lewis acidity have been evaluated. Both contributions are studied by calculations, and the acidities of theses compounds are quantified by the Gutmann–Beckett method, Hammett acidity function, pK_{a}, and fluoride ion affinity (FIA). FIA is defined as the amount of energy released upon binding a fluoride ion in the gas phase. The FIA of two popular strong Lewis acids, BF_{3} and B(C_{6}F_{5})_{3}, are 81 and 106 kcal/mol (340 and 440 kJ/mol) respectively.

=== Donor–acceptor orbital overlap ===
Since Lewis adducts are formed by dative bond between Lewis bases and Lewis acids, the orbital overlap between the Lewis base and σ*(Sb–X) orbital is the source of the acidity. NBO analysis of the Sb(C_{6}F_{5})_{3}P(O)Ph_{3} adduct indicates a donor-acceptor interaction between lp(O) and σ*(Sb–C_{6}F_{5}).

Lowering the LUMO (σ*(Sb–X)) energy increases the Lewis acidity. For example, Sb(C_{6}H_{5})_{3} has a higher LUMO energy (−0.55 eV) and weaker FIA (59 kcal/mol) than Sb(C_{6}F_{5})_{3} (−1.76 eV and 89 kcal/mol).

=== Electrostatic interaction ===
Partial positive charges on the surface of antimony compounds interact with partial negative charges. For example, Sb(C_{6}F_{5})_{3}(o-O_{2}C_{6}Cl_{4}) has a more positively charged site than Sb(C_{6}F_{5})_{3} as shown in its electrostatic potential map, corresponding to higher Lewis acidity (the FIA of Sb(C_{6}F_{5})_{3}(o-O_{2}C_{6}Cl_{4}) and Sb(C_{6}F_{5})_{3} are 116 and 89 kcal/mol, respectively).

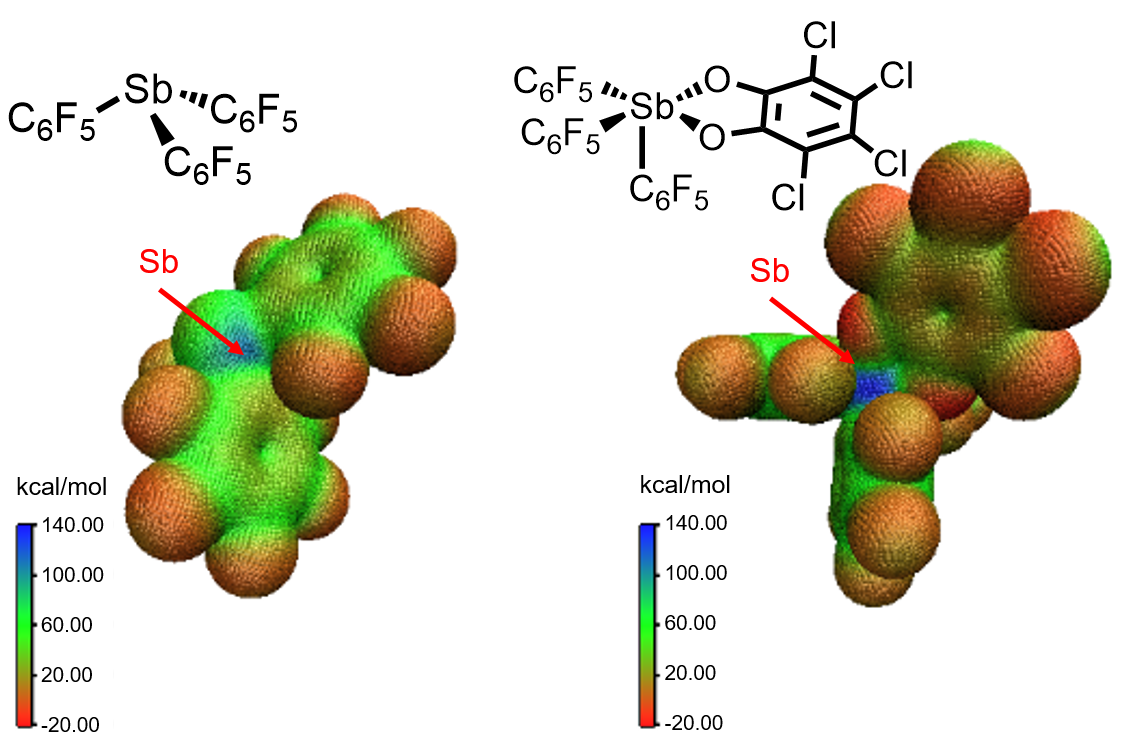
Electrostatic potential map of (right) Sb(C_{6}F_{5})_{3} and (left) Sb(C_{6}F_{5})_{3}(o-O_{2}C_{6}Cl_{4}). High electrostatic potential (blue region in the map) means partial positive charge.

== Structure of Lewis acidic antimony compounds ==
Lewis acidic antimony complexes with a variety of oxidation states and coordination numbers are known. Several salient examples are introduced below.

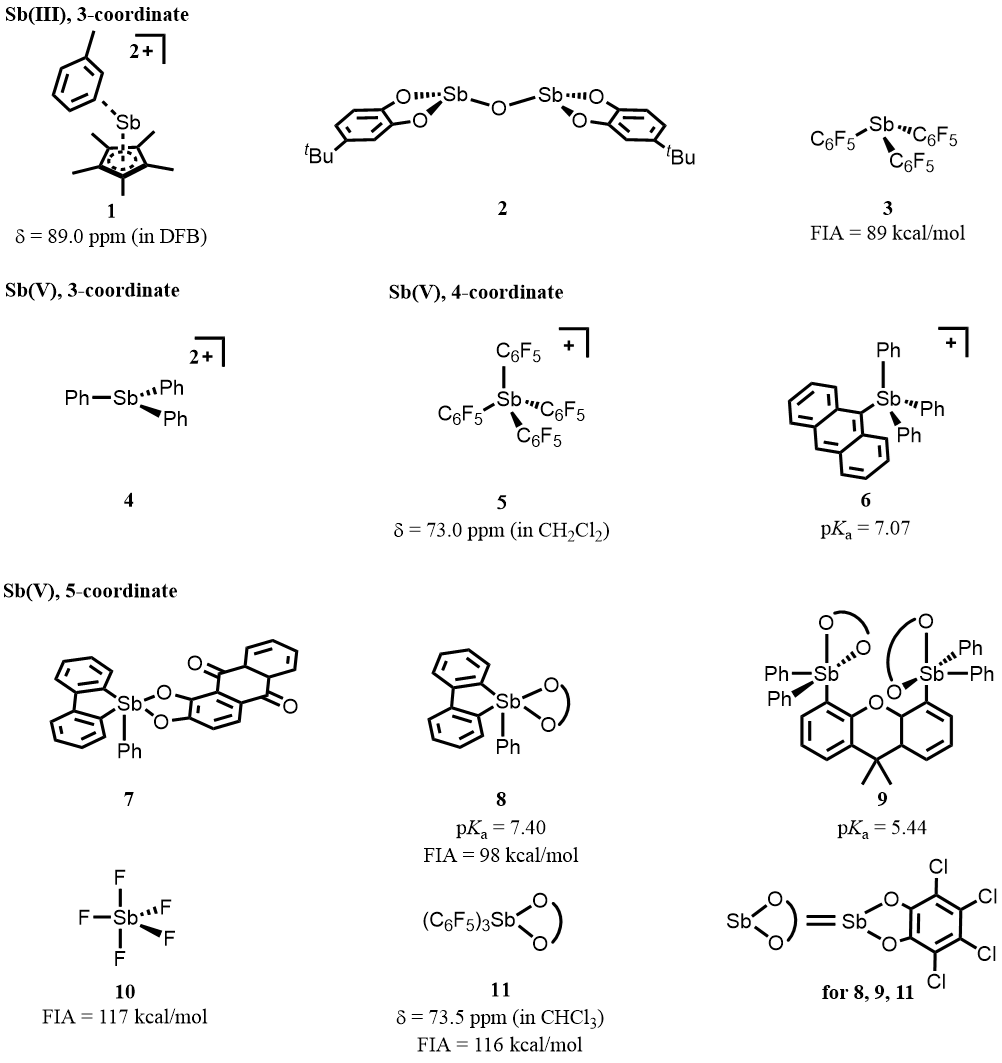
FIA indicates fluoride ion affinity. δ indicates the ^{31}P NMR shift of OPEt_{3} adducts (Gutmann–Beckett method). The chemical shift of OPEt_{3} is 51.0 ppm (in CH_{2}Cl_{2}), 51.2 ppm (in CHCl_{3}), and 47.6 ppm (in DFB (difluorobenzene)).

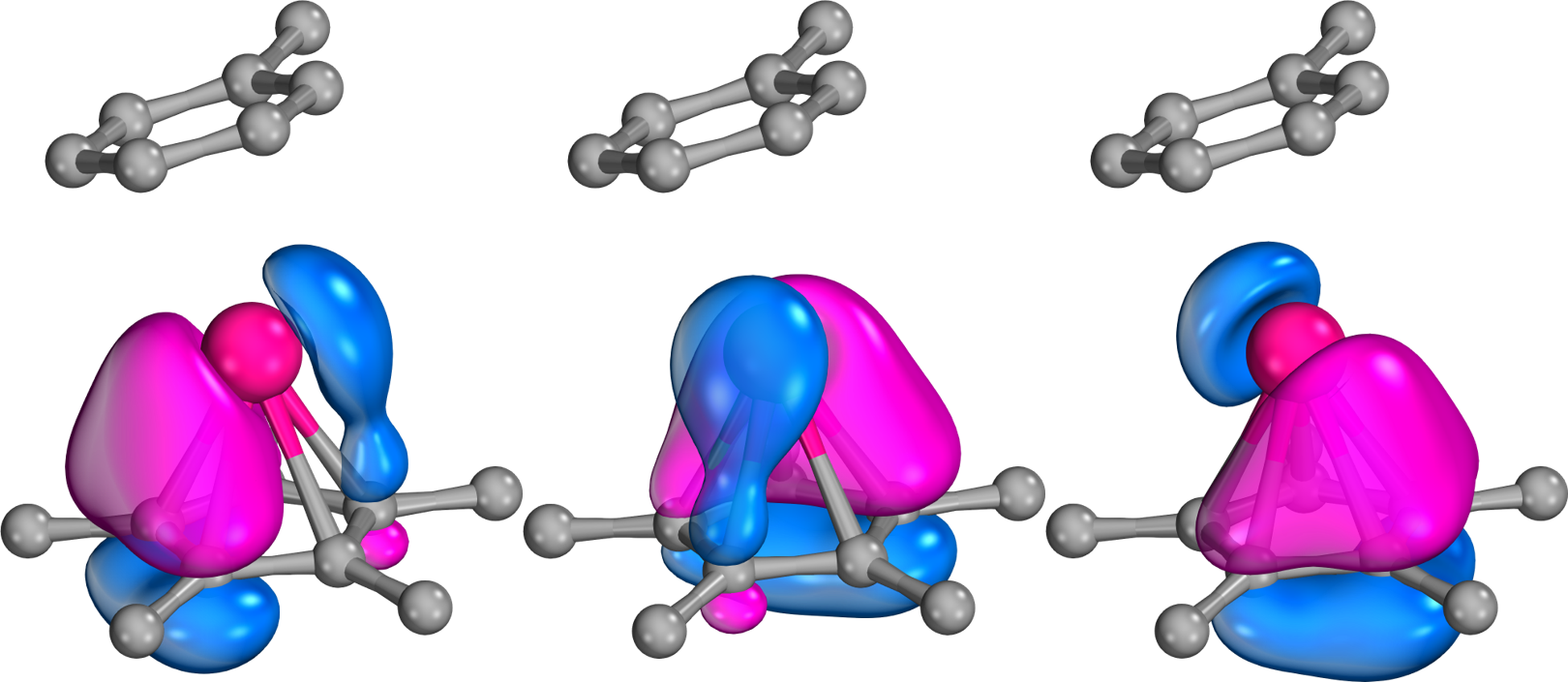
IBO of Sb-(η^{5}-Cp*) bondings in [Sb(tol)(Cp*)]^{2+}(1).

=== 3-coordinate Sb(III) ===
Although stibanes have a lone pair electrons, their antibonding orbitals with electron-withdrawing substituents renders them Lewis acidic. Sb(C_{6}F_{5})_{3} (3) has three σ*(Sb–C_{6}F_{5}) orbitals and three Lewis acidic sites. However, as shown in the electrostatic potential map of Sb(C_{6}F_{5})_{3}, only one site is accessible to Lewis bases due to the asymmetric arrangement of the three aryl rings.

In [Sb(tol)(Cp*)]^{2+} (1), the η^{5}-Cp* binding mode is confirmed using IBO analysis. In the solid state structure, the Sb-C bond distances between Sb and carbons in the Cp* ring are 2.394(4) to 2.424(4) Å, but the Sb–C bond distances with the toluene are 2.993(5) to 3.182(5) Å. This longer Sb–toluene distance implies toluene lability in solution.

Sb_{2}(o-catecholate)_{2}(μ-O) (2) had been predicted that a Lewis base would bind to two antimony centers in a bridging manner. However, it was observed that 2 binds with halide anions in various ratios (3:1, 2:1, 1:1, 1:2, 1:3). Cozzolono et al. suggested three reasons for its complex binding mode. First, rotational freedom around the bridge oxygen disrupts the Lewis base binding between two antimony centers. Second, intramolecular interactions between oxygen at catecholate and antimony competes with external Lewis base binding. Third, a high-polarity nucleophilic solvent, dimethylsulfoxide, is required to dissolve 2 due to the solubility and the solvent is also able to bind at antimony.

=== 3-coordinate Sb(V) ===
[SbPh_{3}]^{2+} (4) was not isolated. Instead, its Lewis adducts, [SbPh_{3}(OPPh_{3})_{2}]^{2+} and [SbPh_{3}(dmap)_{2}(OTf)]^{+}, were isolated. In the trigonal bipyramidal [SbPh_{3}(OPPh_{3})_{2}]^{2+}, two OPPh_{3} are located in axial positions and the Sb–O bond distance (2.102(2) Å) is similar to the sum of the covalent radii of Sb and O (2.05 Å). In the distorted octahedral [SbPh_{3}(dmap)_{2}(OTf)]^{+}, the Sb–N distance with the dmap (2.222(2) Å) is shorter than reported N–Sb^{+} distances. This bond distance implies Lewis adduct formation. In addition, a reaction between dmap and [SbPh_{3}(OPPh_{3})_{2}]^{2+} forms [SbPh_{3}(dmap)_{2}(OTf)]^{+}. The experimental results indicate that [SbPh_{3}]^{2+} is the Lewis acidic counterpart of these adducts.

=== 4-coordinate Sb(V) ===
Tetrahedral stibonium cations also show Lewis acidity. Since [Sb(C_{6}F_{5})_{4}]^{+} (5) forms an adduct with triflate, the cation can be isolated as a [Sb(C_{6}F_{5})_{4}][B(C_{6}F_{5})_{4}] salt. Short Sb–C bond distances of 2.095(2) Å and a tetrahedral space group in the crystal proves that isolated [Sb(C_{6}F_{5})_{4}]^{+} is completely free of external electron donors. This cationic antimony Lewis acid shows strong acidity: firstly, [Sb(C_{6}F_{5})_{4}]^{+} abstracts fluoride anion from weakly coordinating anions, SbF^{−}_{6}, and secondly, the acidity measured by the Gutmann–Beckett method of [Sb(C_{6}F_{5})_{4}]^{+} (5) is comparable with that of the B(C_{6}F_{5})_{3} adduct in CH_{2}Cl_{2} (76.6 ppm).

SbPh_{3}(Ant)^{+} (6) (where Ant is 9-anthryl) was isolated as triflate salt. 6 has a tetrahedral structure like 5. In a solid state structure of a fluoride adduct, AntPh_{3}SbF, the incoming fluoride occupies the axial position of a trigonal bipyramidal structure, and the sterically demanding anthryl is located at the equatorial site.

=== 5-coordinate Sb(V) ===
Neutral Sb(V) complexes are also Lewis acids. Compounds 7, 8 and 11 share the structure of spirocyclic stiborane. The LUMO of 8 mainly has its lobe at the antimony atoms and it renders 8 Lewis acidic. In detail, the LUMO can be assigned to as localized orbital on stiborafluorene moiety with larger nodes at the 9-position (Sb). Thus, Lewis bases bind towards trans to biphenylene and its fluoride adducts are asymmetric: 8·F^{−} has two enantiomers and 7·F^{−} has two diastereomers and four enantiomers.

A bisantimony complex (9) is synthesized starting from xanthene. 9 has C_{2} symmetry and the Sb–Sb distance is 4.7805(7) Å. Both antimony(V) centers have distorted square pyramidal geometry with the geometry index τ_{5} = 0.08. The base planes of the antimony centers meet face to face and this geometry allows 1:1 binding with F^{−}, unlike 2.

== Trends in acidity ==
=== Inductive effect ===
Introduction of electron-withdrawing substituents on antimony results in increased acidity. For example, intramolecular donor–acceptor interactions of two stiboranes, o-C_{6}H_{4}(PPh_{2})[SbPh_{2}(O_{2}C_{6}Cl_{4})] and o-C_{6}H_{4}(PPh_{2})[Sb(C_{6}F_{5})_{2}(O_{2}C_{6}Cl_{4})], have been analyzed by AIM. AIM analysis of electron density at the bond critical point (bcp) and delocalization index indicates that electron-withdrawing substituents on Sb(V) lead to an increased P–Sb bonding covalency.

AIM analysis of the intramolecular donor-acceptor interactions of two stiboranes
P-Sb bonding	o-C_{6}H_{4}(PPh_{2})(Sb(C_{6}F_{5})_{2}(O_{2}C_{6}Cl_{4})	o-C_{6}H_{4}(PPh_{2})(Sb(C_{6}H_{5})_{2}(O_{2}C_{6}Cl_{4})
Electron density at the bcp (e/r_{Bohr}^{3})	0.054	0.035
Delocalization index	0.38	0.24

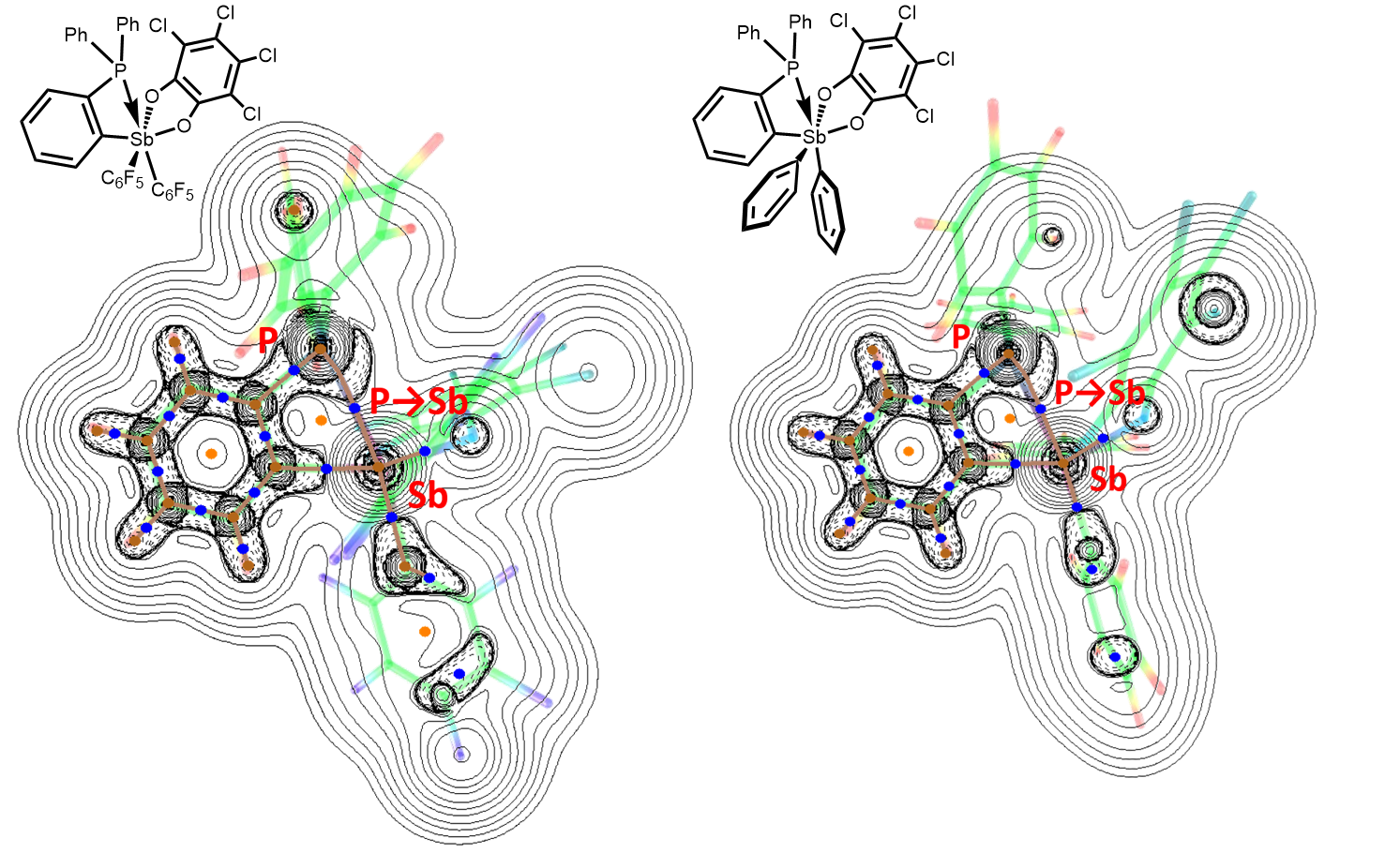
Contour plots of the Laplacian of the electron density of (left) (o-C_{6}H_{4}(PPh_{2})[Sb(C_{6}F_{5})_{2}(O_{2}C_{6}Cl_{4})] and (right) o-C_{6}H_{4}(PPh_{2})[(SbPh_{2}(O_{2}C_{6}Cl_{4})]. Blue dots are the bcp and brown lines are the bond paths.

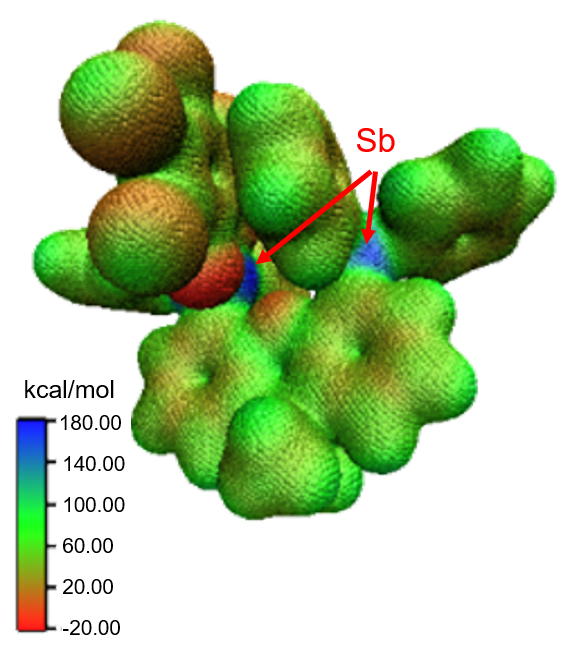
Electrostatic potential map of a bisantimony(V) complex (9). Partial positive charges at antimony centers facing each other.

=== Bisantimony compounds vs mono-antimony compounds ===
A bisantimony complex (9) is a stronger Lewis acid than a monoantimony compound (8) because both Lewis acidic sites cooperatively contribute to the Lewis base binding. The electrostatic potential map of 9 shows positive charges on the Sb centers facing each other.

This cooperativity is supported by the Sb-(μ-F)-Sb moiety in solid state structure of F^{−} binding bisantimony compound 9.

== Reactions ==
=== Fluoride complexation ===
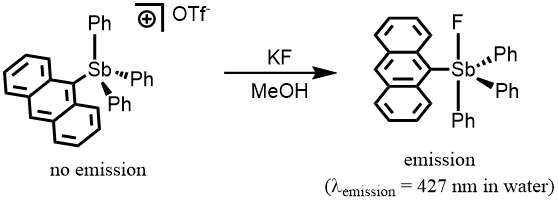
Fluoride binding turns on emission.

The 9-anthryltriphenylstibonium cation shows weak fluorescent emission (Φ = 0.7%), but a corresponding fluoride adduct, fluorostiborane, shows a strong anthryl-based emission at 427 nm (Φ = 9.5% in CHCl_{3}). Fluoride-selective electrodes were developed by using Lewis acidic antimony compounds as ionophores.

=== Catalysis ===
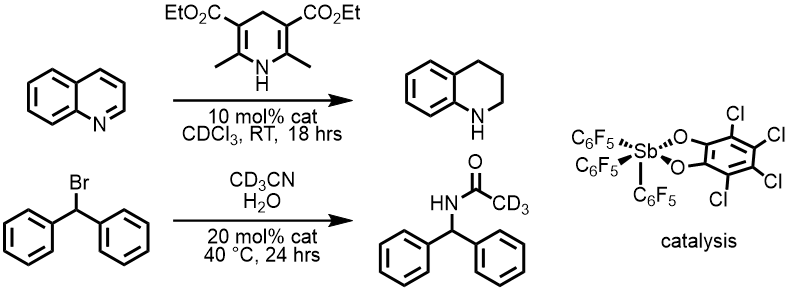
Examples of catalytic activity of Lewis acidic antimony compounds in (top) hydrogenation of quinoline using Hantzsch ester and (bottom) Ritter reaction.

Strongly acidic antimony compounds catalyze transformations such as the transfer hydrogenation and the Ritter reaction.

Tetraarylstibonium cations catalyze cycloadditions between epoxides and CO_{2} or isocyanate to produce oxazolidinones.

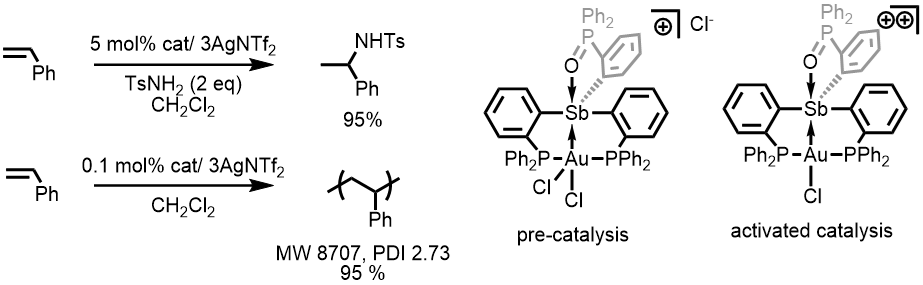
Examples of Z-type ligand antimony compounds. Strong electron donation from gold to antimony decreases electron density on the Au center and the Au–Sb complex catalyzes (top) hydroamination and (bottom) polymerization of olefin.

Lewis acidic antimony compounds can act as Z-type ligands. Owing to the strong σ-accepting ability of dicationic Sb ligand, a gold-antimony complex can catalyze styrene polymerization and hydroamination after being activated by AgNTf_{2}.
