= Coordination isomerism =

Coordination isomerism is a form of structural isomerism in which the composition of the coordination complex ion varies. In a coordination isomer the total ratio of ligand to metal remains the same, but the ligands attached to a specific metal ion change. Examples of a complete series of coordination isomers require at least two metal ions and sometimes more.

For example, a solution containing ([Co(NH_{3})_{6}]^{3+} and [Cr(CN)_{6}]^{3−}) is a coordination isomer with a solution containing [Cr(NH_{3})_{6}]^{3+} and [Co(CN)_{6}]^{3−}.

== See also ==
- Coordination complex#Isomerism – This type of isomerism arises from the interchange of ligands between cationic and anionic entities of different metal ions present in a complex.
