= Capped trigonal prismatic molecular geometry =

7-coordinate molecular geometry

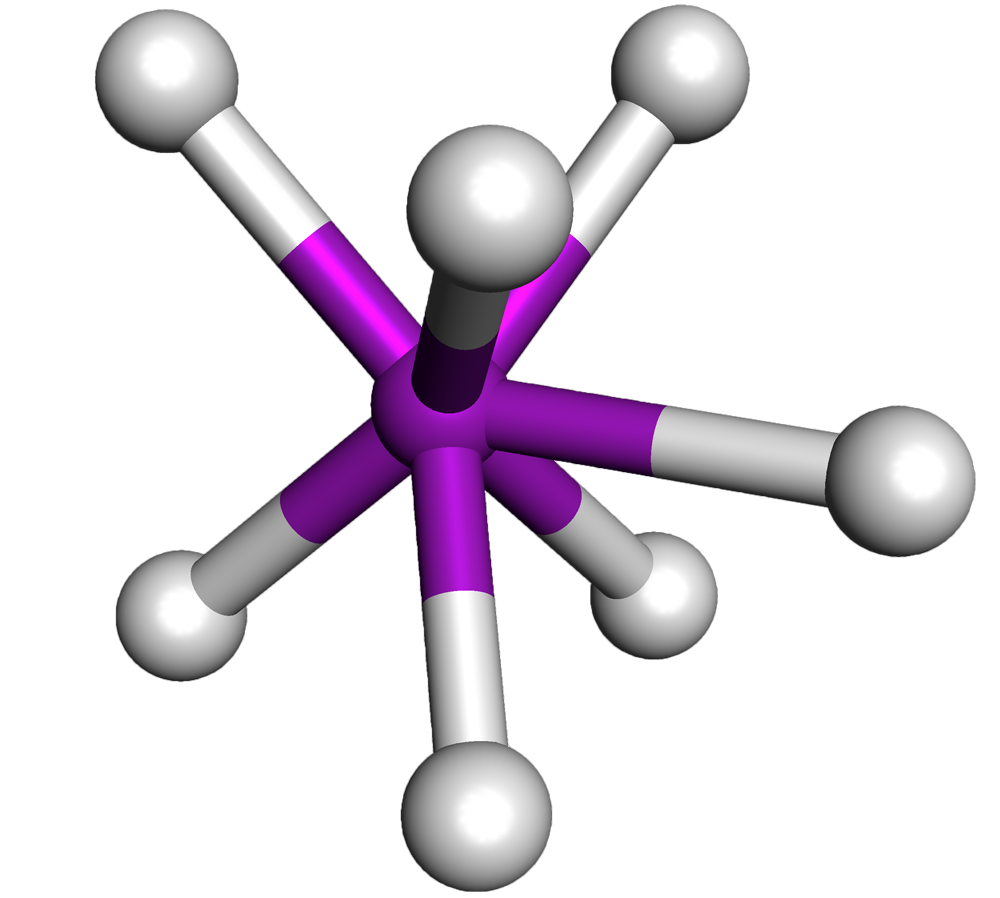
- Examples: TaF^{2−}_{7}
- Point group: C_{2v}
- Coordination number: 7

In chemistry, the capped trigonal prismatic molecular geometry describes the shape of compounds where seven atoms or groups of atoms or ligands are arranged around a central atom defining the vertices of an augmented triangular prism. This shape has C_{2v} symmetry and is one of the three common shapes for heptacoordinate transition metal complexes, along with the pentagonal bipyramid and the capped octahedron.

Examples of the capped trigonal prismatic molecular geometry are the heptafluorotantalate (TaF^{2−}_{7}) and the heptafluoroniobate (NbF^{2−}_{7}) ions.
