= Potassium heptafluorotantalate =

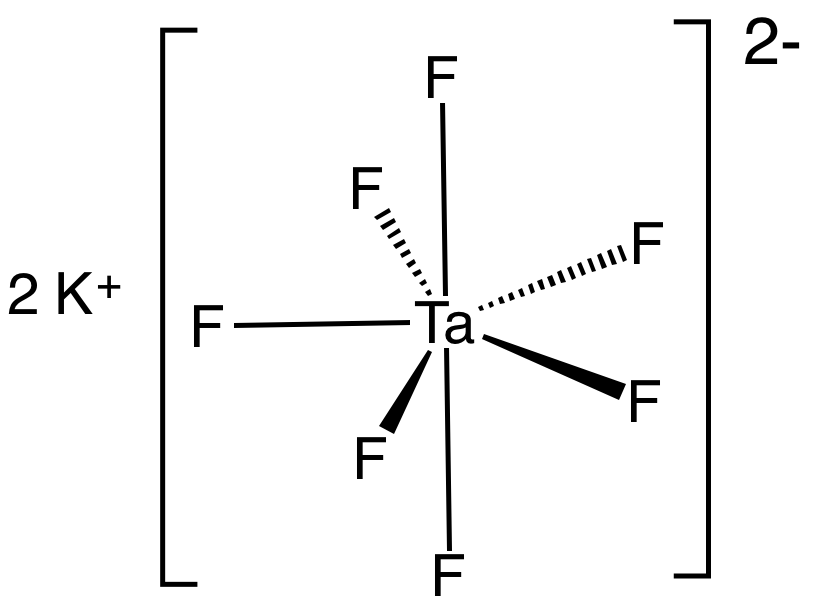

Names
- IUPAC name Dipotassium heptafluorotantalate
- Systematic IUPAC name Dipotassium heptafluorotantalum(2-)
- Other names Potassium heptafluorotantalate(V); Potassium fluorotantalate

Identifiers
| CAS Number | 16924-00-8 |
| 3D model (JSmol) | Interactive image |
| ChemSpider | 28541740 |
| ECHA InfoCard | 100.037.245 |
| EC Number | 240-986-1 |
| PubChem CID | 28146 |
| CompTox Dashboard (EPA) | DTXSID00884943 |
- InChI: InChI=1S/7FH.2K.Ta/h7*1H;;;/q;;;;;;;2*+1;+5/p-7
- SMILES: F[Ta-2](F)(F)(F)(F)(F)F.[K+].[K+]

Properties
| Chemical formula | K_{2}[TaF_{7}] |
| Molar mass | 392.13 g/mol |
| Appearance | white solid |
| Density | 4.56 g/mL at 25 °C |
| Melting point | 630 to 820 °C (1,166 to 1,508 °F; 903 to 1,093 K) |
| Solubility in water | 0.5 g/100 mL (15 °C) Nb_{2}O_{5} + 4 KHF_{2} + 6 HF → 2K_{2}NbF_{7} + 5 H_{2}O. |

Hazards
- GHS labelling
| Pictograms | (GHS06: Toxic) (GHS07: Exclamation mark) |
| Signal word | Danger |
| Hazard statements | H301, H315, H319, H331, H335 |
| Precautionary statements | P261, P264, P270, P271, P280, P301+P310, P302+P352, P304+P340, P305+P351+P338, P311, P312, P321, P330, P332+P313, P337+P313, P362, P403+P233, P405, P501 |
- Lethal dose or concentration (LD, LC)
| LD_{50} (median dose) | 110 mg/kg (Oral: rat) |
- Except where otherwise noted, data are given for materials in their standard state (at 25 °C [77 °F], 100 kPa). verify (what is ?) Infobox references

Potassium heptafluorotantalate is an inorganic compound with the formula K_{2}[TaF_{7}]. It is the potassium salt of the heptafluorotantalate anion [TaF_{7}]^{2−}. This white, water-soluble solid is an intermediate in the purification of tantalum from its ores and is the precursor to the metal.

== Preparation ==
=== Industrial ===
Potassium heptafluorotantalate is an intermediate in the industrial production of metallic tantalum. Its production involves leaching tantalum ores, such as columbite and tantalite, with hydrofluoric acid and sulfuric acid to produce the water-soluble hydrogen heptafluorotantalate.

Ta_{2}O_{5} + 14 HF → 2 H_{2}[TaF_{7}] + 5 H_{2}O

This solution is subjected to a number of liquid-liquid extraction steps to remove metallic impurities (most importantly niobium) before being treated with potassium fluoride to produce K_{2}[TaF_{7}]

H_{2}[TaF_{7}] + 2 KF → K_{2}[TaF_{7}] + 2 HF

=== Lab-scale ===
Hydrofluoric acid is both corrosive and toxic, making it unappealing to work with; as such a number of alternative processes have been developed for small-scale syntheses. Potassium heptafluorotantalate can be produced by both anhydrous and wet methods. The anhydrous method involves the reaction of tantalum oxide with potassium bifluoride or ammonium bifluoride according to the following equation:

Ta_{2}O_{5} + 4 KHF_{2} + 6 HF → 2 K_{2}[TaF_{7}] + 5 H_{2}O

The method was originally reported by Berzelius.

K_{2}[TaF_{7}] can also be precipitated from solutions in hydrofluoric acid provided that the concentration of HF is below about 42%. Solutions having higher concentrations of HF yield potassium hexafluorotantalate [KTaF_{6}]. The K-salt can be also precipitated from a solution in hydrofluoric acid of tantalum pentachloride:

5 HF + 2 KF + TaCl_{5} → K_{2}[TaF_{7}] + 5 HCl

== Structure ==
Potassium heptafluorotantalate exists in at least two polymorphs. α-K_{2}[TaF_{7}] is the most common form and crystallises in the monoclinic P2_{1}/c space group. The structure is composed of [TaF_{7}]^{2−} units interconnected by potassium ions. [TaF_{7}]^{2−} polyhedra may be described as monocapped trigonal prisms with the capping atom located on one of the rectangular faces. Potassium atoms are 9-coordinated and may be viewed as distorted monocapped square prisms. In terms of the coordination sphere of the heavy metal, potassium heptafluoroniobate is similar to the tantalum salt.

At temperatures above 230 °C this converts to β-K_{2}[TaF_{7}], which is orthorhombic (space group: Pnma). This structure also consists of potassium ions and the complex anion [TaF_{7}]^{2−}. The structure of the 7-coordinate [TaF_{7}]^{2−} units is essentially unchanged. However the potassium atoms now exist in 2 environments where they coordinate to either 11 or 8 fluorine atoms.

== Reactions ==
K_{2}[TaF_{7}] is primarily used to produce metallic tantalum by reduction with sodium. This takes place at approximately 800 °C in molten salt and proceeds via a number of potential pathways.

K_{2}[TaF_{7}] + 5 Na → Ta + 5 NaF + 2 KF

K_{2}[TaF_{7}] is susceptible to hydrolysis. For example, a boiling aqueous solution of K_{2}[TaF_{7}] yields potassium oxyfluorotantalate (K_{2}Ta_{2}O_{3}F_{6}), known as “Marignac’s salt”. In order to prevent hydrolysis and co-precipitation of potassium oxyfluorotantalate, a small excess of HF is added to the solution.
