= Pentagonal bipyramidal molecular geometry =

Molecular structure having atoms at the centre and corners of a pentagonal bipyramid

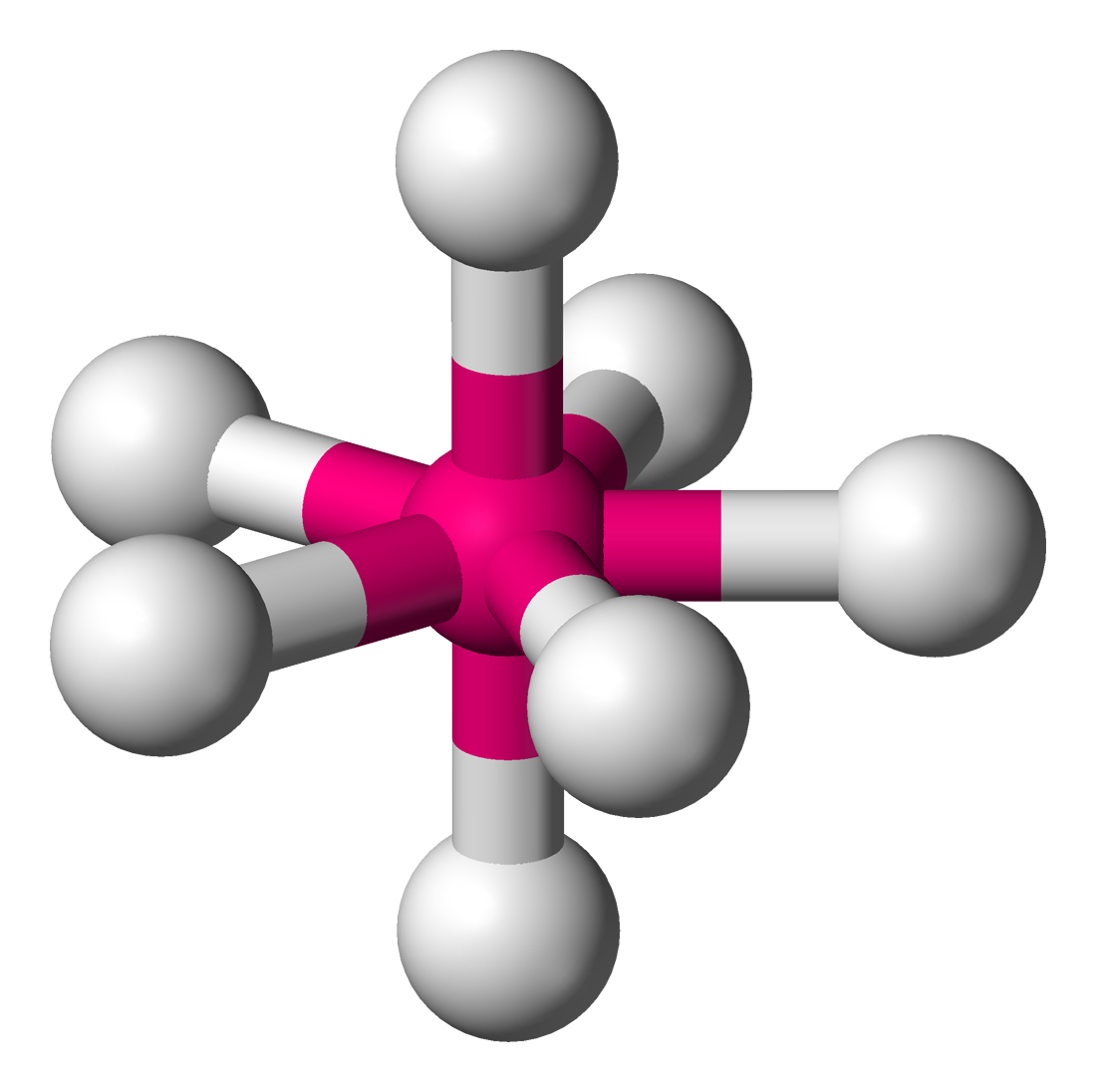
- Examples: IF_{7}, ZrF^{3−}_{7}
- Point group: D_{5h}
- Coordination number: 7
- Bond angle(s): 90°, 72°
- μ (Polarity): 0

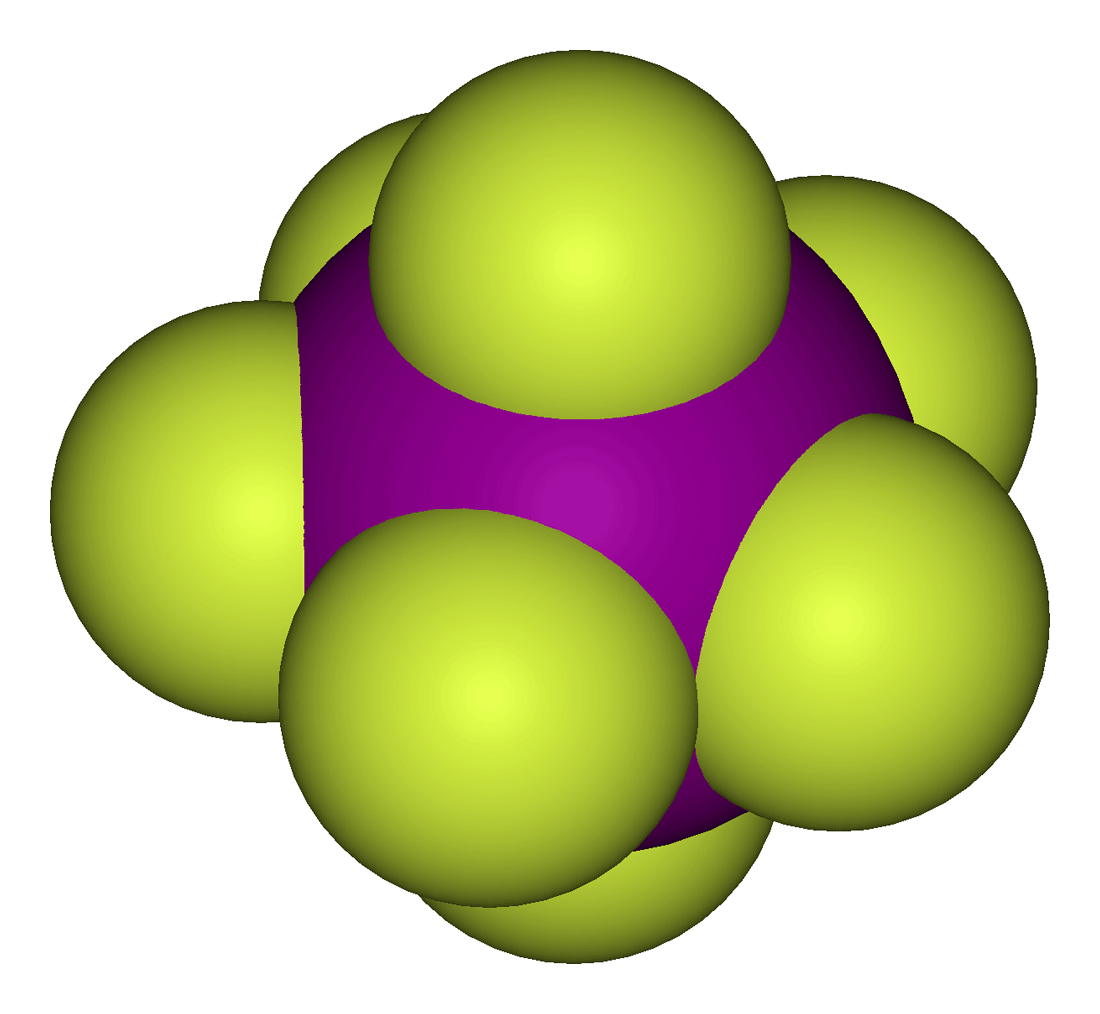
Structure of iodine heptafluoride, an example of a molecule with the pentagonal-bipyramidal coordination geometry.

In chemistry, a pentagonal bipyramid is a molecular geometry with one atom at the centre with seven ligands at the corners of a pentagonal bipyramid. A perfect pentagonal bipyramid belongs to the molecular point group D_{5h}.

The pentagonal bipyramid is a case where bond angles surrounding an atom are not identical (see also trigonal bipyramidal molecular geometry). This is one of the three common shapes for heptacoordinate transition metal complexes, along with the capped octahedron and the capped trigonal prism.

Pentagonal bipyramids are claimed to be promising coordination geometries for lanthanide-based single-molecule magnets, since they present no extradiagonal crystal field terms, therefore minimising spin mixing, and all of their diagonal terms are in first approximation protected from low-energy vibrations, minimising vibronic coupling.

== Examples ==
- Iodine heptafluoride (IF_{7}) with 7 bonding groups
- Rhenium heptafluoride (ReF_{7})
- Peroxo chromium (IV) complexes, such as [Cr(O_{2})_{2}(NH_{3})_{3}], where the peroxo groups occupy four of the planar positions.
- ZrF^{3−}_{7} and HfF^{3−}_{7}
