= Geometry index =

Parameter used to characterize molecular geometry

In coordination chemistry and crystallography, the geometry index or structural parameter (τ) is a number ranging from 0 to 1 that indicates what the geometry of the coordination center is. The first such parameter for 5-coordinate compounds was developed in 1984. Later, parameters for 4-coordinate compounds were developed.

== 5-coordinate compounds ==

To distinguish whether the geometry of the coordination center is trigonal bipyramidal or square pyramidal, the τ_{5} (originally just τ) parameter was proposed by Addison et al.:

$$\tau_5 = \frac{\beta-\alpha}{60^\circ} \approx -0.01667\alpha + 0.01667\beta$$

where: β > α are the two greatest valence angles of the coordination center.

When τ_{5} is close to 0 the geometry is similar to square pyramidal, while if τ_{5} is close to 1 the geometry is similar to trigonal bipyramidal:

Extreme values of τ_{5}
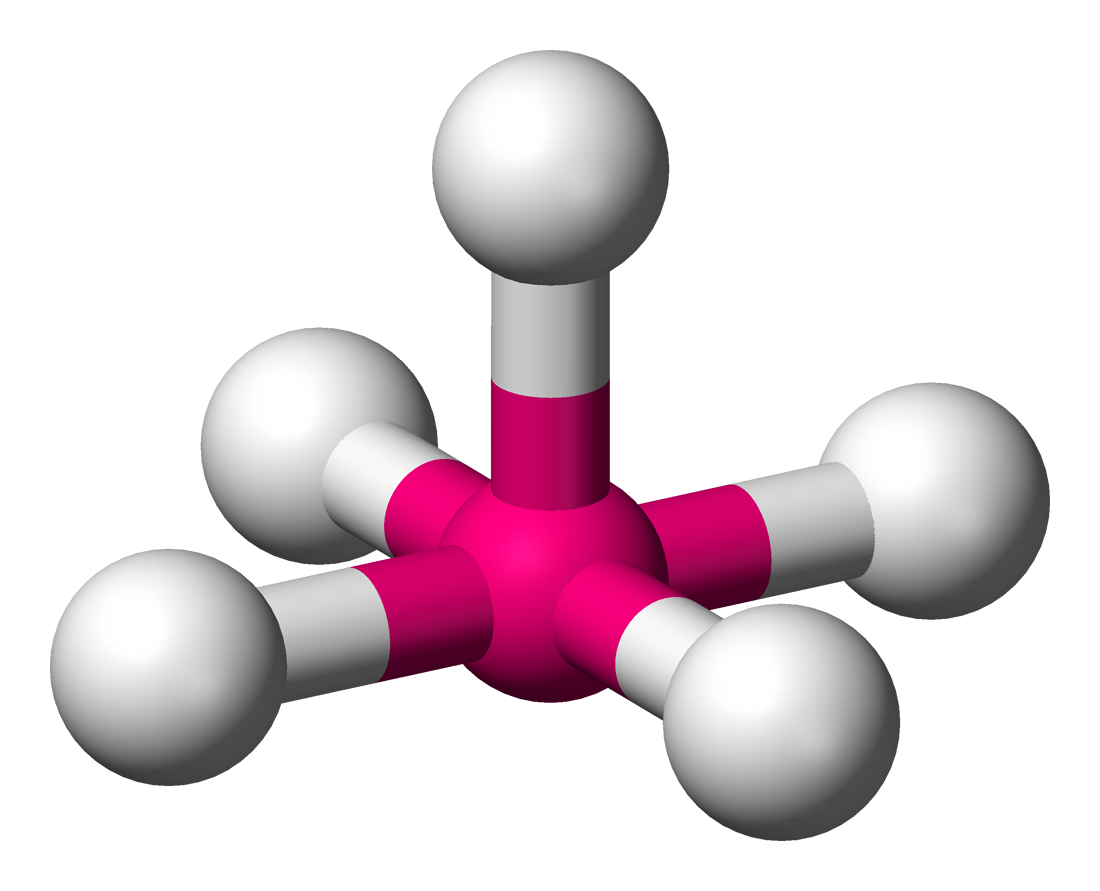
Square pyramidal geometry
(β = α = 180°)
τ_{5} = 0

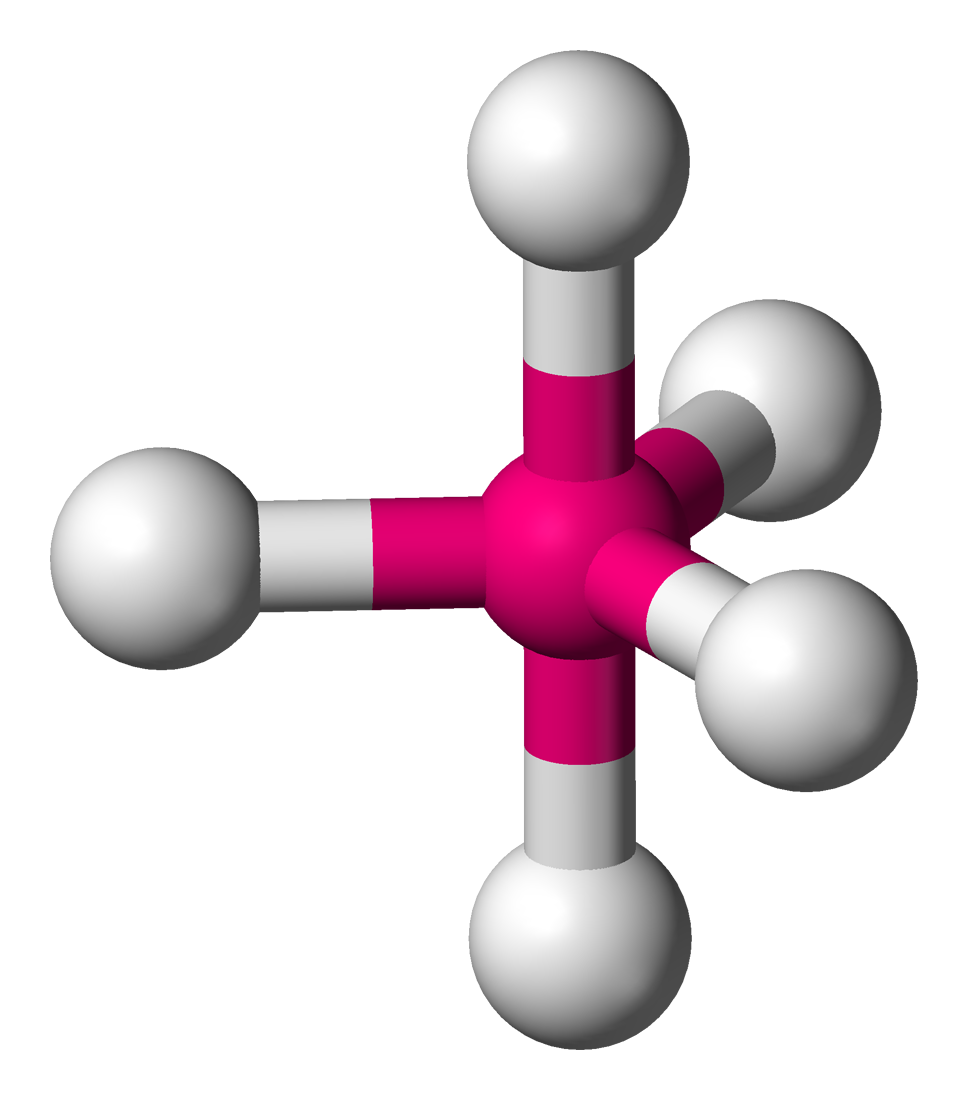
Trigonal bipyramidal geometry
(β = 180°, α = 120°)
τ_{5} = 1

== 4-coordinate compounds ==

In 2007 Houser et al. developed the analogous τ_{4} parameter to distinguish whether the geometry of the coordination center is square planar or tetrahedral. The formula is:

$$\tau_4 = \frac{360^\circ - (\alpha + \beta)}{360^\circ - 2\theta} \approx -0.00709\alpha - 0.00709\beta + 2.55$$

where: α and β are the two greatest valence angles of coordination center; θ = cos^{−1}(− 1/3) ≈ 109.5° is a tetrahedral angle.

When τ_{4} is close to 0 the geometry is similar to square planar, while if τ_{4} is close to 1 then the geometry is similar to tetrahedral. However, in contrast to the τ_{5} parameter, this does not distinguish α and β angles, so structures of significantly different geometries can have similar τ_{4} values. To overcome this issue, in 2015 Okuniewski et al. developed parameter τ_{4}′ that adopts values similar to τ_{4} but better differentiates the examined structures:

$$\tau_4' = \frac{\beta - \alpha}{360^\circ - \theta} + \frac{180^\circ - \beta}{180^\circ - \theta} \approx -0.00399\alpha - 0.01019\beta + 2.55$$

where: β > α are the two greatest valence angles of coordination center; θ = cos^{−1}(− 1/3) ≈ 109.5° is a tetrahedral angle.

Extreme values of τ_{4} and τ_{4}′ denote exactly the same geometries, however τ_{4}′ is always less or equal to τ_{4} so the deviation from ideal tetrahedral geometry is more visible. If for tetrahedral complex the value of τ_{4}′ parameter is low, then one should check if there are some additional interactions within coordination sphere. For example, in complexes of mercury(II), the Hg···π interactions were found this way.

Selected geometries and corresponding values of τ_{4} and τ_{4}′
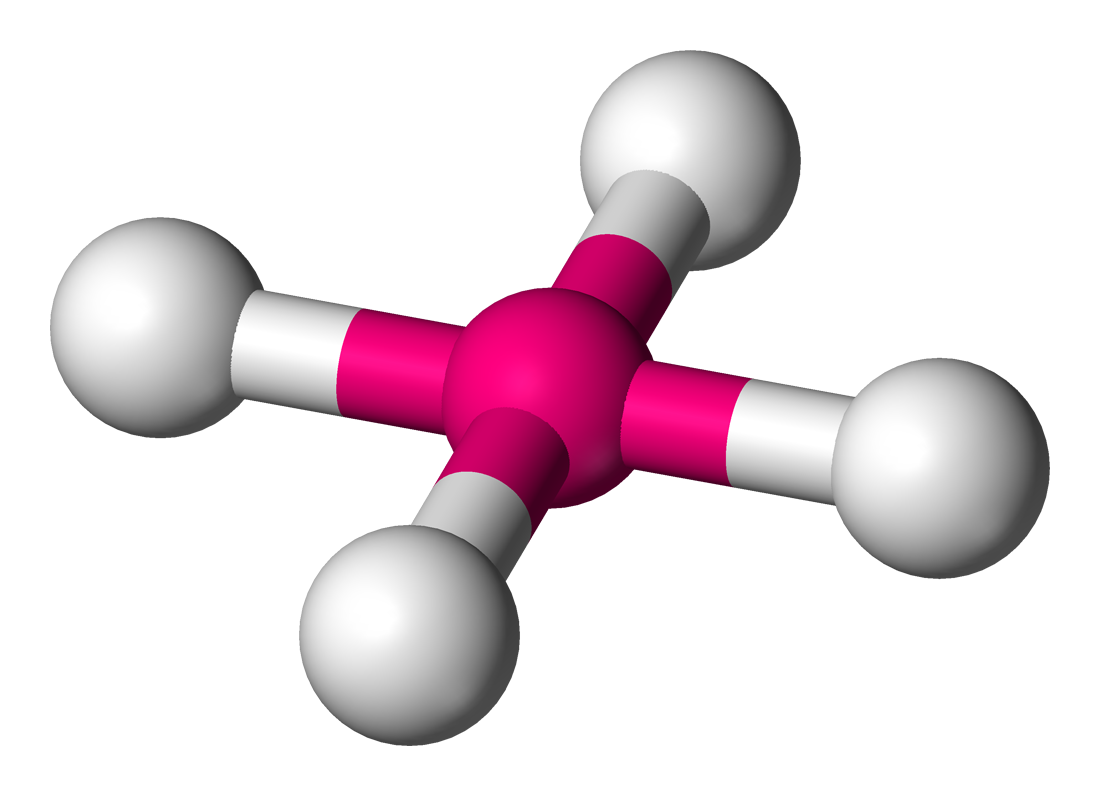
Square planar geometry
(β = α = 180°)
τ_{4} = τ_{4}′ = 0

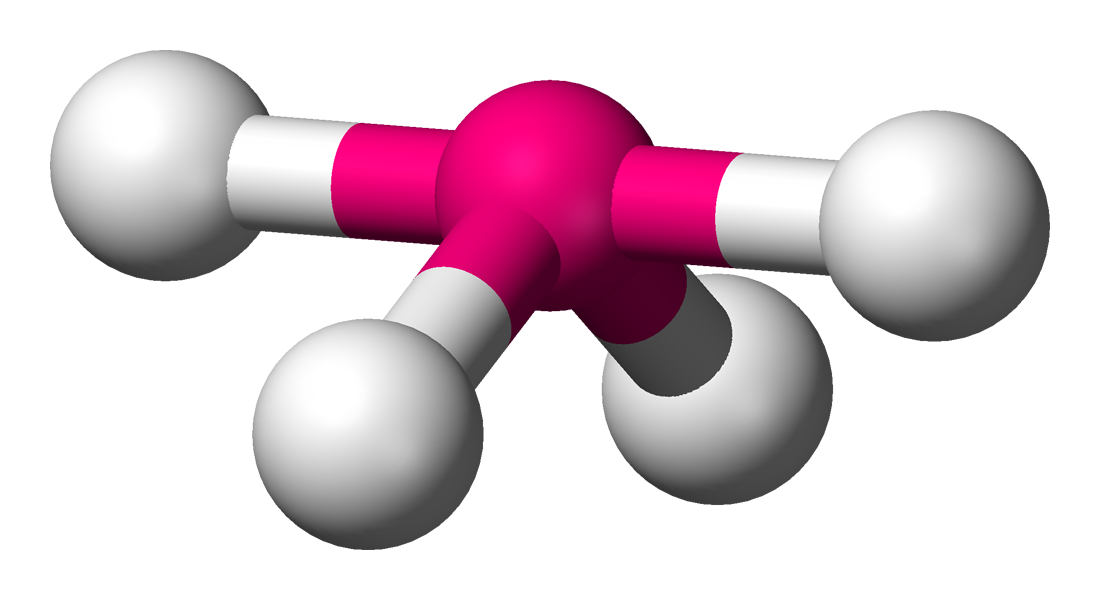
Seesaw geometry
(β = 180°, α = 120°)
τ_{4} ≈ 0.43, τ_{4}′ ≈ 0.24

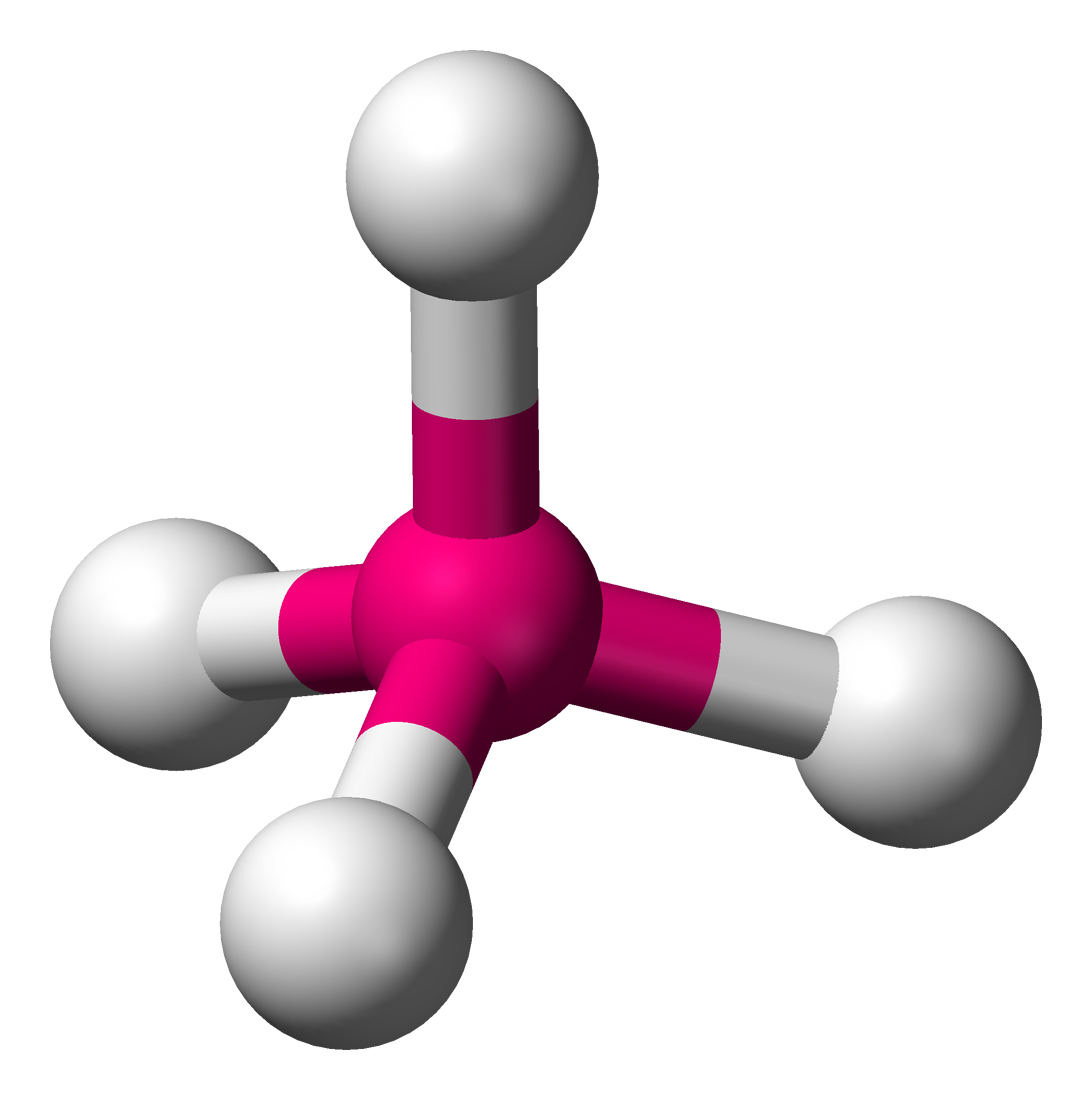
Tetrahedral geometry
(β = α = θ ≈ 109.5°)
τ_{4} = τ_{4}′ = 1

== Read more ==
- A web application for determining molecular geometry indices on the basis of 3D structural files can be found here.
