= Capped octahedral molecular geometry =

7-coordinate molecular geometry

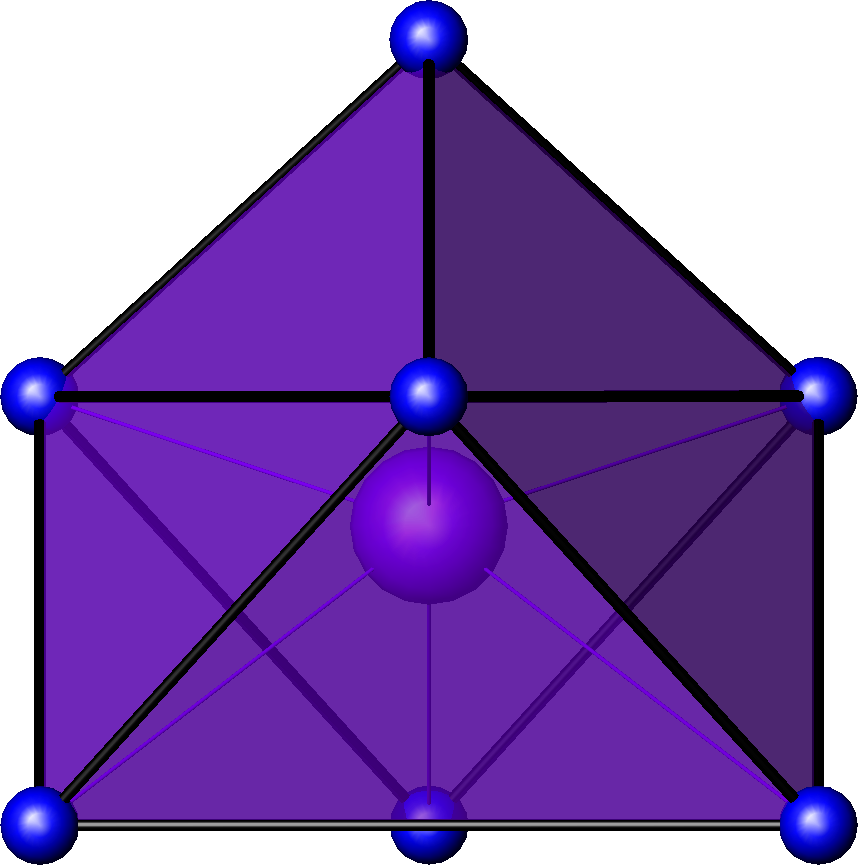
- Examples: MoF^{−}_{7}
- Point group: C_{3v}
- Coordination number: 7

In chemistry, the capped octahedral molecular geometry describes the shape of compounds where seven atoms or groups of atoms or ligands are arranged around a central atom defining the vertices of a gyroelongated triangular pyramid. This shape has C_{3v} symmetry and is one of the three common shapes for heptacoordinate transition metal complexes, along with the pentagonal bipyramid and the capped trigonal prism.

Examples of the capped octahedral molecular geometry are the heptafluoromolybdate (MoF^{−}_{7}) and the heptafluorotungstate (WF^{−}_{7}) ions.

The "distorted octahedral geometry" exhibited by some AX_{6}E_{1} molecules such as xenon hexafluoride (XeF_{6}) is a variant of this geometry, with the lone pair occupying the "cap" position.
