= Smart inorganic polymer =

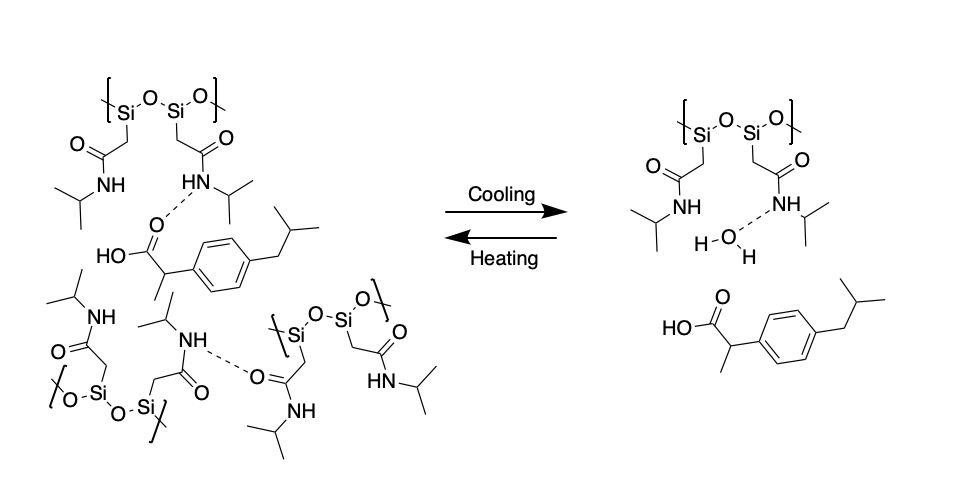
Ibuprofen is encapsulated within the hydrogen bonding network of a smart polysiloxane above LCST, and then released when temperature falls below LCST and the polymer becomes water-soluble.

Smart inorganic polymers (SIPs) are hybrid or fully inorganic polymers with tunable (smart) properties such as stimuli responsive physical properties (shape, conductivity, rheology, bioactivity, self-repair, sensing etc.). While organic polymers are often petrol-based, the backbones of SIPs are made from elements other than carbon. Common backbones utilized in SIPs include polysiloxanes, polyphosphates, and polyphosphazenes, to name a few.

== Role of COST action CM1302 ==
COST action 1302 is a European Community "Cooperation in Science and Technology" research network initiative. This represents a large share of the total body of work on SIPs. The results of this work are reviewed in the 2019 book, Smart Inorganic Polymers: Synthesis, Properties, and Emerging Applications in Materials and Life Sciences.

== Smart polysiloxanes ==
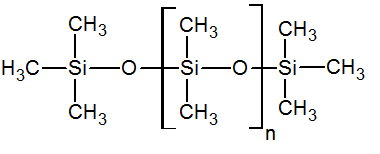
A generic polysiloxane

Polysiloxanes, commonly known as silicones, is a common class of commercial polymers. Polysiloxane containing TiO_{2} provide photoactive coatings. Smart properties have also been reported for polysiloxane coatings without metal oxides, namely, a polysiloxane/polyethylenimine coating designed to protect magnesium from corrosion that was found to be capable of self-healing small scratches.

Poly-(ε-caprolactone)/siloxane is a solid electrolyte matrix with a lithium perchlorate electrolyte, paired to a W_{2}O_{3} film, responds to a change in electrical potential by changing transparency. This makes it a potentially useful electrochromic smart glass.

== Smart phosphorus polymers ==
There exist a sizable number of phosphorus polymers with backbones ranging from primarily phosphorus to primarily organic with phosphorus subunits. Some of these have been shown to possess smart properties, and are largely of-interest due to the biocompatibility of phosphorus for biological applications like drug delivery, tissue engineering, and tissue repair.

=== Polyphosphates ===
Polyphosphate (PolyP) is an inorganic polymer made from phosphate subunits. It typically exists in its deprotonated form, and can form salts with physiological metal cations like Ca^{2+}, Sr^{2+}, and Mg^{2+}. When salted to these metals, it can selectively induce bone regeneration (Ca-PolyP), bone hardening (Sr-PolyP), or cartilage regeneration (Mg-PolyP) depending on the metal to which it is salted. This smart ability to attenuate the kind of tissue regenerated in response to different metal cations makes it a promising polymer for biomedical applications.

=== Polyphosphazenes ===
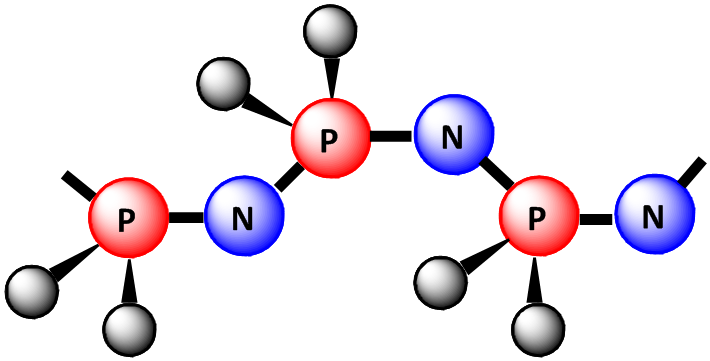
A generic polyphosphazene

Polyphosphazene is an inorganic polymer with a backbone consisting of phosphorus and nitrogen, which can also form inorganic-organic hybrid polymers with the addition of organic substituents. Some polyphosphazenes have been designed through the addition of amino acid ester side chains such that their LCST is near body temperature and thus they can form a gel in situ upon injection into a person, making them potentially useful for drug delivery. They biodegrade into a near-neutral pH mixture of phosphates and ammonia that has been shown to be non-toxic, and the rate of their biodegradation can be tuned with the addition of different substituents from full decomposition within days with glyceryl derivatives, to biostable with fluoroalkoxy substituents.

=== Poly-ProDOT-Me_{2} ===
Poly-ProDOT-Me_{2} is a phosphorus-based inorganic-organic hybrid polymer, which, when paired to a V_{2}O_{5} film, provides a material that changes color upon application of an electrical current. This 'smart glass' is capable of reducing light transmission from 57% to 28% in under 1 second, a much faster transformation than that of commercially available photochromic lenses.

== Smart metalloid and metal containing polymers ==
While metals are not typically associated with polymeric structures, the inclusion of metal atoms either throughout the backbone of, or as pendant structures on a polymer can provide unique smart properties, especially in relation to their redox and electronic properties. These desirable properties can range from self-repair of oxidation, to sensing, to smart material self-assembly, as discussed below.

=== Polystannanes ===
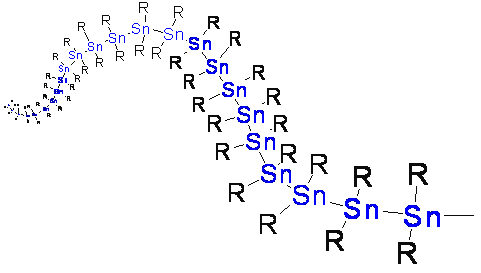
A generic polystannane

Polystannane, a unique polymer class with a tin backbone. The conductive tin backbone is surrounded by organic substituents, making it act as an atomic-scale insulated wire. Some polystannanes such as (SnBu_{2})_{n} and (SnOct_{2})_{n} have shown the smart ability to align themselves with external stimuli. Polystannane are however expensive to produce and unstable to light.

=== Icosahedral boron polymers ===
Icosahedral boron is a geometrically unusual allotrope of boron, which can be either added as side chains to a polymer or co-polymerized into the backbone. Icosahedral boron side chains on polypyrrole have been shown to allow the polypyrrole to self-repair when overoxidized because the icosahedral boron acts as a doping agent, enabling overoxidation to be reversed.

=== Polyferrocenylsilane ===
Polyferrocenylsilanes are a group of common organosilicon metallopolymer with backbones consisting of silicon and ferrocene. Variants of polyferroceylsilanes have been found to exhibit smart self-assembly in response to oxidation and subsequent smart self-disassembly upon reduction, as well as variants which can respond to electrochemical stimulation. One such example is a thin film of a polystyrene-polyferrocenylsilane inorganic-organic hybrid copolymer that was found to be able to adsorb and release ferritin with the application of an electrical potential.

=== Ferrocene biosensing ===
A number of ferrocene-organic inorganic-organic hybrid polymers have been reported to have smart properties that make them useful for application in biosensing. Multiple polymers with ferrocene side-chains cross-linked with glucose oxidase have shown oxidation activity which results in electrical potential in the presence of glucose, making them useful as glucose biosensors. This sort of activity is not limited to glucose, as other enzymes can be crosslinked to allow for sensing of their corresponding molecules, like a poly(vinylferrocene)/carboxylated multiwall carbon nanotube/gelatin composite that was bound to uricase, giving it the ability to act as a biosensor for uric acid.

== See also ==
- Coatings
- Coordination Polymers
- Drug Delivery
- Electrochromism
- Inorganic Polymers
- Smart Materials
