= Hexafluorophosphazene =

Names
- IUPAC name 2,2,4,4,6,6-Hexafluoro-1,3,5,2λ^{5},4λ^{5},6λ^{5}-triazatriphosphinine
- Other names: Phosphonitrilic fluoride trimer; Hexafluorotriphosphazene; Hexafluorocyclotriphosphazene; Triphosphonitrilic fluoride; 2,2,4,4,6,6-Hexafluoro-2,2,4,4,6,6-hexahydro-1,3,5,2,4,6-triazatriphosphorine

Identifiers
CAS Number	15599-91-4
3D model (JSmol)	Interactive image
ChemSpider	123428
ECHA InfoCard	100.150.019
EC Number	621-138-3
PubChem CID	139958
CompTox Dashboard (EPA)	DTXSID40166013
- InChI: InChI=1S/F6N3P3/c1-10(2)7-11(3,4)9-12(5,6)8-10 Key: DKQPXAWBVGCNHG-UHFFFAOYSA-N; InChI=1/F6N3P3/c1-10(2)7-11(3,4)9-12(5,6)8-10
- SMILES: N1=P(N=P(N=P1(F)F)(F)F)(F)F

Properties
Chemical formula	(NPF_{2})_{3}
Molar mass	248.933 g·mol^{−1}
Appearance	White powder or lumps
Melting point	27 °C (81 °F; 300 K)
Boiling point	51 °C (124 °F; 324 K)
Solubility in water	decomposes
Solubility	Toluene

Structure
Molecular shape	Planar P_{3}N_{3} ring
Dipole moment	0 D

Hazards
- Occupational safety and health (OHS/OSH)
Main hazards	Corrosive
- GHS labelling
Pictograms	(GHS05: Corrosive)
Signal word	Danger
Hazard statements	H314
Precautionary statements	P260, P264, P280, P301+P330+P331, P303+P361+P353, P304+P340+P310, P305+P351+P338+P310, P363, P405, P501

Related compounds
Related compounds	Hexachlorophosphazene; Polyphosphazene; Trithiazyl trichloride; Tetrasulfur tetranitride; Polythiazyl; Benzene; Borazine
- Except where otherwise noted, data are given for materials in their standard state (at 25 °C [77 °F], 100 kPa). Infobox references

Hexafluorophosphazene is an inorganic compound with the formula (NPF_{2})_{3}. It takes the form of a white powder or lumps. It is sensitive to moisture and heat.

== Structure ==
The molecule has a cyclic, unsaturated P_{3}N_{3} backbone consisting of alternating phosphorus and nitrogen atoms, and can be viewed as a trimer of the hypothetical compound N≡PF_{2} (phosphazyl difluoride). Its classification as a phosphazene highlights its relationship to benzene. Hexafluorophosphazene has a hexagonal P_{3}N_{3} ring with six equivalent P–N bonds. Each phosphorus atom is additionally bonded to two fluorine atoms.

The molecule possesses D_{3h} symmetry, and each phosphorus center is tetrahedral.

The P_{3}N_{3} ring in hexachlorophosphazene deviates from planarity and is slightly ruffled (see chair conformation). By contrast, the P_{3}N_{3} ring in hexafluorophosphazene is completely planar.
