= Inorganic polymer =

Polymer whose backbone does not contain carbon

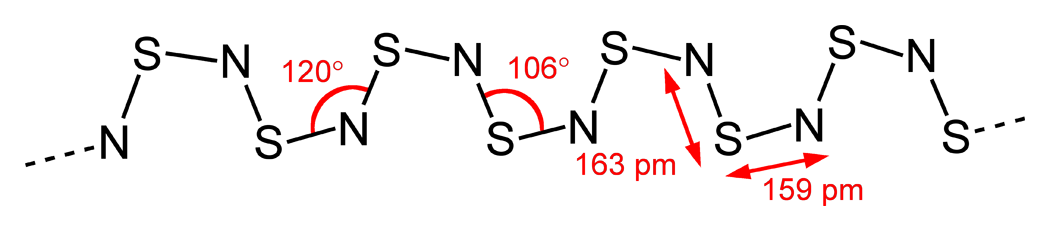
The inorganic polymer (SN)_{x}

In polymer chemistry, an inorganic polymer is a polymer with a skeletal structure that does not include carbon atoms in the backbone. Polymers containing inorganic and organic components are sometimes called hybrid polymers, and most so-called inorganic polymers are hybrid polymers. One of the best known examples is polydimethylsiloxane, otherwise known commonly as silicone rubber. Inorganic polymers offer some properties not found in organic materials including low-temperature flexibility, electrical conductivity, and nonflammability. The term inorganic polymer refers generally to one-dimensional polymers, rather than to heavily crosslinked materials such as silicate minerals. Inorganic polymers with tunable or responsive properties are sometimes called smart inorganic polymers. A special class of inorganic polymers are geopolymers, which may be anthropogenic or naturally occurring.

== Main group backbone ==
Traditionally, the area of inorganic polymers focuses on materials in which the backbone is composed exclusively of main-group elements.

=== Homochain polymers ===
Homochain polymers have only one kind of atom in the main chain. One member is polymeric sulfur, which forms reversibly upon melting any of the cyclic allotropes, such as S_{8}. Organic polysulfides and polysulfanes feature short chains of sulfur atoms, capped respectively with alkyl and H. Elemental tellurium and the gray allotrope of elemental selenium also are polymers, although they are not processable.

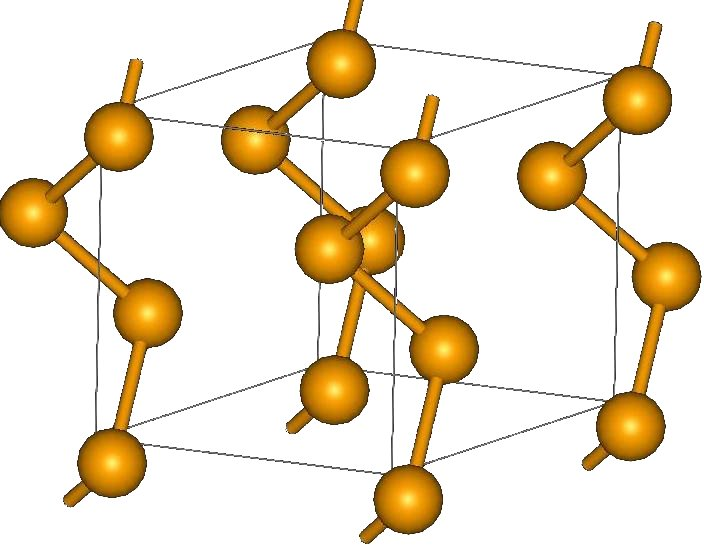
The gray allotrope of selenium consists of helical chains of Se atoms.

Polymeric forms of the group IV elements are well known. The premier materials are polysilanes, which are analogous to polyethylene and related organic polymers. They are more fragile than the organic analogues and, because of the longer Si−Si bonds, carry larger substituents. Poly(dimethylsilane) is prepared by reduction of dimethyldichlorosilane. Pyrolysis of poly(dimethylsilane) gives SiC fibers.

Heavier analogues of polysilanes are also known to some extent. These include polygermanes, [R_{2}Ge]_{n}, and polystannanes, [R_{2}Sn]_{n}_{.}

=== Heterochain polymers ===
==== Si-based ====
Heterochain polymers have more than one type of atom in the main chain. Typically two types of atoms alternate along the main chain. Of great commercial interest are the polysiloxanes, where the main chain features Si and O centers: −Si−O−Si−O−. Each Si center has two substituents, usually methyl or phenyl. Examples include polydimethylsiloxane (PDMS, [Me_{2}SiO]_{n}), polymethylhydrosiloxane (PMHS, [MeSi(H)O]_{n}) and polydiphenylsiloxane [Ph_{2}SiO]_{n}). Related to the siloxanes are the polysilazanes. These materials have the backbone formula −Si−N−Si−N−. One example is perhydridopolysilazane PHPS. Such materials are of academic interest.

==== P-based ====
A related family of well studied inorganic polymers are the polyphosphazenes. They feature the backbone −P−N−P−N−. With two substituents on phosphorus, they are structurally similar related to the polysiloxanes. Such materials are generated by ring-opening polymerization of hexachlorophosphazene followed by substitution of the P−Cl groups by alkoxide. Such materials find specialized applications as elastomers.

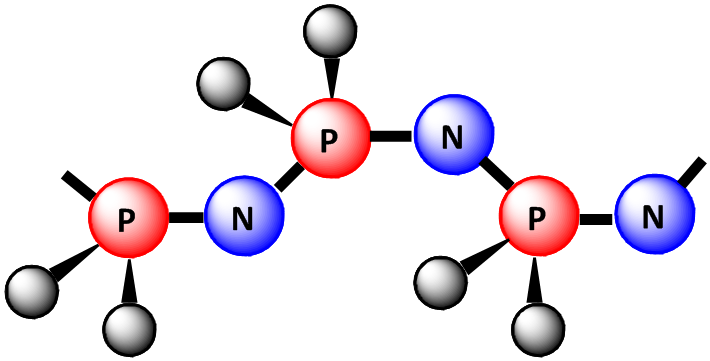
General structure of polyphosphazenes. Gray spheres represent any organic or inorganic group.

==== B-based ====
Boron–nitrogen polymers feature −B−N−B−N− backbones. Examples are polyborazylenes, polyaminoboranes.

==== S-based ====
The polythiazyls have the backbone −S−N−S−N−. Unlike most inorganic polymers, these materials lack substituents on the main chain atoms. Such materials exhibit high electrical conductivity, a finding that attracted much attention during the era when polyacetylene was discovered. It is superconducting below 0.26 K.

==== Ionomers ====
Usually not classified with charge-neutral inorganic polymers are ionomers. Phosphorus–oxygen and boron-oxide polymers include the polyphosphates and polyborates.

== Transition-metal-containing polymers ==
Inorganic polymers also include materials with transition metals in the backbone. Examples are Polyferrocenes, Krogmann's salt and Magnus's green salt.

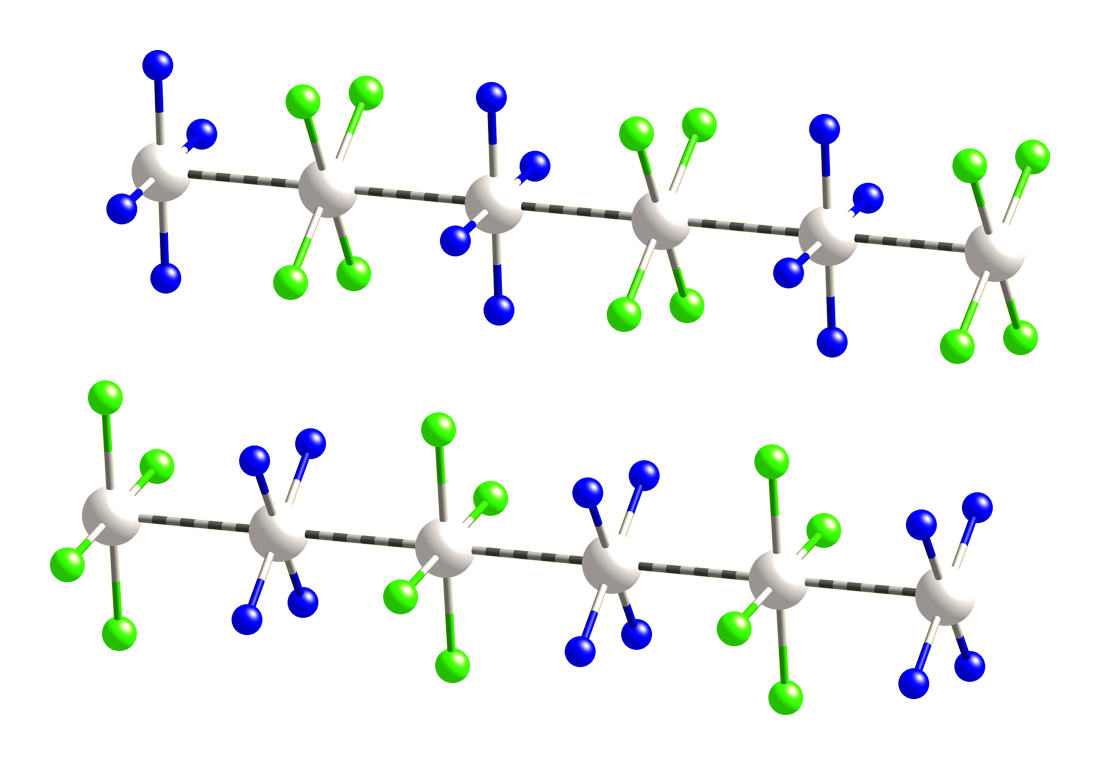
Magnus's green salt is a salt that features a one-dimension chain of weak Pt–Pt bonds.

== Polymerization methods ==
Inorganic polymers are formed, like organic polymers, by:

- Step-growth polymerization: Polysiloxanes;
- Chain-growth polymerization: Polysilanes;
- Ring-opening polymerization: Poly(dichlorophosphazene).

== Reactions ==
Inorganic polymers are precursors to inorganic solids. This type of reaction is illustrated by the stepwise conversion of ammonia borane to discrete rings and oligomers, which upon pyrolysis give boron nitrides.
