= Hexachlorophosphazene =

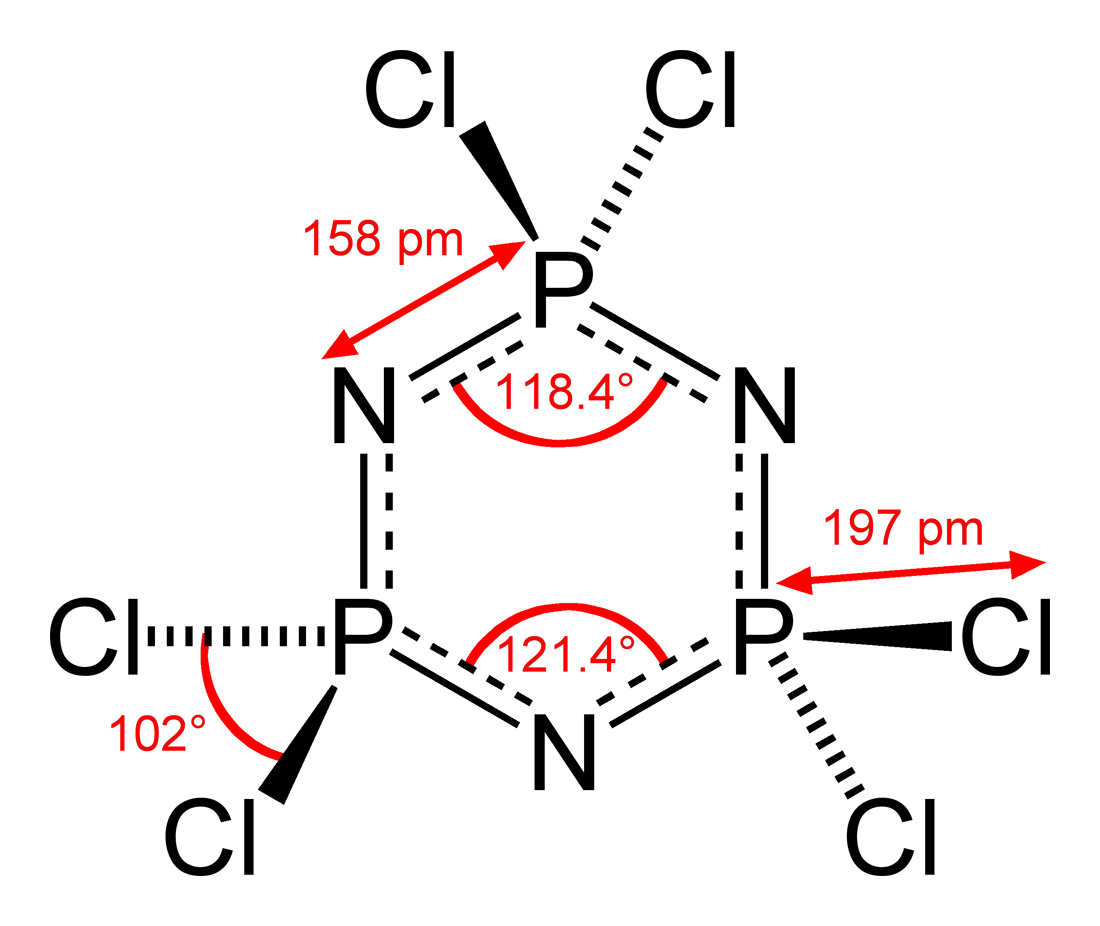
- Hexachlorophosphazene conventional formula and bond lengths

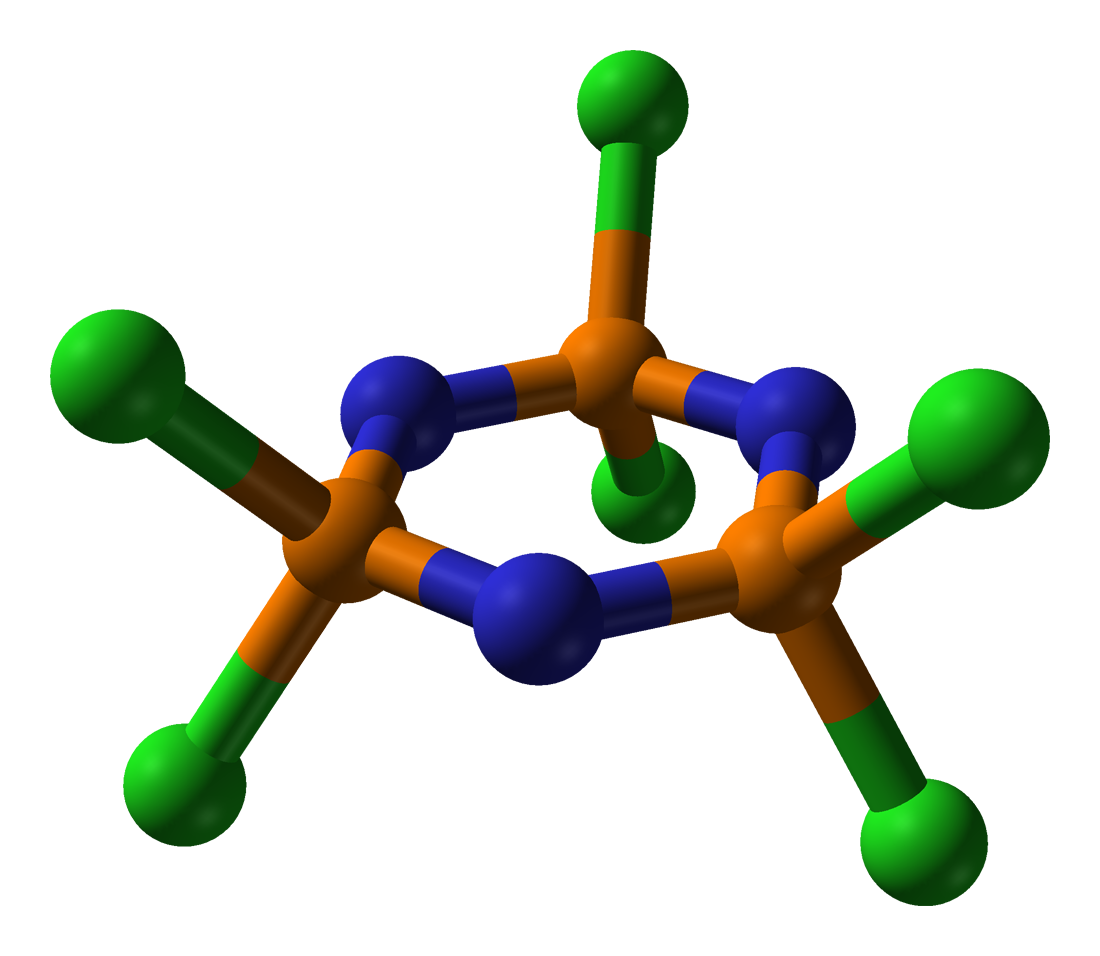
- Hexachlorophosphazene ball-and-stick model

Names
- IUPAC name 2,2,4,4,6,6-Hexachloro-1,3,5,2λ^{5},4λ^{5},6λ^{5}-triazatriphosphinine
- Other names: Phosphonitrilic chloride trimer; Hexachlorotriphosphazene; Hexachlorocyclotriphosphazene; Triphosphonitrilic chloride; 2,2,4,4,6,6-hexachloro-2,2,4,4,6,6-hexahydro-1,3,5,2,4,6-triazatriphosphorine

Identifiers
CAS Number	940-71-6
3D model (JSmol)	Interactive image
ChEMBL	ChEMBL2022081
ChemSpider	190959
ECHA InfoCard	100.012.160
EC Number	213-376-8
PubChem CID	220225
UNII	7VR28MTM9D
CompTox Dashboard (EPA)	DTXSID4061331
- InChI: InChI=1S/Cl6N3P3/c1-10(2)7-11(3,4)9-12(5,6)8-10 Key: UBIJTWDKTYCPMQ-UHFFFAOYSA-N; InChI=1/Cl6N3P3/c1-10(2)7-11(3,4)9-12(5,6)8-10 Key: UBIJTWDKTYCPMQ-UHFFFAOYAJ
- SMILES: N1=P(N=P(N=P1(Cl)Cl)(Cl)Cl)(Cl)Cl

Properties
Chemical formula	(NPCl_{2})_{3}
Molar mass	347.64 g·mol^{−1}
Appearance	colourless solid
Density	1.98 g/mL at 25 °C
Melting point	112 to 114 °C (234 to 237 °F; 385 to 387 K)
Boiling point	decomposes (above 167 °C)
Sublimation conditions	60 °C at 0.05 Torr
Solubility in water	decomposes
Solubility in carbon tetrachloride	24.5 wt % (20 °C); 35.6 wt % (40 °C); 39.2 wt % (60 °C)
Solubility in cyclohexane	22.3 wt % (20 °C); 36.8 wt % (40 °C); 53.7 wt % (60 °C)
Solubility in xylene	27.7 wt % (20 °C); 38.9 wt % (40 °C); 50.7 wt % (60 °C)
Magnetic susceptibility (χ)	−149×10^{−6} cm^{3}/mol
Refractive index (n_{D})	1.62 (589 nm)

Structure
Crystal structure	orthorhombic
Space group	62 (Pnma, D^{16}_{2h})
Point group	D_{3h}
Lattice constant	a = 13.87 Å, b = 12.83 Å, c = 6.09 Å
Formula units (Z)	4
Molecular shape	chair (slightly ruffled)
Dipole moment	0 D

Thermochemistry
Std enthalpy of formation (Δ_{f}H^{⦵}_{298})	−812.4 kJ/mol
Enthalpy of vaporization (Δ_{f}H_{vap})	55.2 kJ/mol
Enthalpy of sublimation (Δ_{f}H_{sublim})	76.2 kJ/mol

Hazards
- Occupational safety and health (OHS/OSH)
Main hazards	mild irritant
- GHS labelling
Pictograms	(GHS05: Corrosive)
Signal word	Danger
Hazard statements	H314
Precautionary statements	P260, P264, P280, P301+P330+P331, P303+P361+P353, P304+P340, P305+P351+P338, P310, P321, P363, P405, P501
Flash point	Non-flammable

Related compounds
Related compounds	Hexafluorophosphazene; Poly(dichlorophosphazene); Polyphosphazene; Trithiazyl trichloride; Tetrasulfur tetranitride; Polythiazyl; Benzene; Borazine
- Except where otherwise noted, data are given for materials in their standard state (at 25 °C [77 °F], 100 kPa). verify (what is ?) Infobox references

Hexachlorophosphazene is an inorganic compound with the chemical formula (NPCl_{2})_{3}. The molecule has a cyclic, unsaturated backbone consisting of alternating phosphorus and nitrogen atoms, and can be viewed as a trimer of the hypothetical compound N≡PCl_{2} (phosphazyl dichloride). Its classification as a phosphazene highlights its relationship to benzene. There is large academic interest in the compound relating to the phosphorus-nitrogen bonding and phosphorus reactivity.

Occasionally, commercial or suggested practical applications have been reported, too, utilising hexachlorophosphazene as a precursor chemical. Derivatives of noted interest include the hexalkoxyphosphazene lubricants obtained from nucleophilic substitution of hexachlorophosphazene with alkoxides, or chemically resistant inorganic polymers with desirable thermal and mechanical properties known as polyphosphazenes produced from the polymerisation of hexachlorophosphazene.

== Structure and characterisation ==
=== Bond lengths and conformation ===
Hexachlorophosphazene is a cyclic molecule, containing a P_{3}N_{3} core with alternating nitrogen and phosphorus atoms, and two additional chlorine atoms bonded to each phosphorus atom. Hexachlorophosphazene molecule contains six equivalent P–N bonds, for which the adjacent P–N distances are 157 pm. This is characteristically shorter than the ca. 177 pm P–N bonds in the valence saturated phosphazane analogues.

The molecule possesses D_{3h} symmetry, and each phosphorus center is tetrahedral with a Cl–P–Cl angle of 101°.

The P_{3}N_{3} ring in hexachlorophosphazene deviates from planarity and is slightly ruffled (see chair conformation). By contrast, the P_{3}N_{3} ring in the related hexafluorophosphazene species is completely planar.

=== Characterisation methods ===
^{31}P-NMR spectroscopy is the usual method for assaying hexachlorophosphazene and its reactions. Hexachlorophosphazene exhibits a single resonance at 20.6 ppm as all P environments are chemically equivalent.

In it IR spectrum, the 1370 and 1218 cm^{−1} vibrational bands are assigned to ν_{P–N} stretches. Other bands are found at 860 and 500–600 cm^{−1}, respectively assigned to ring and ν_{P–Cl}.

Hexachlorophosphazene and many of its derivatives have been characterized by single crystal X-ray crystallography.

== Bonding ==
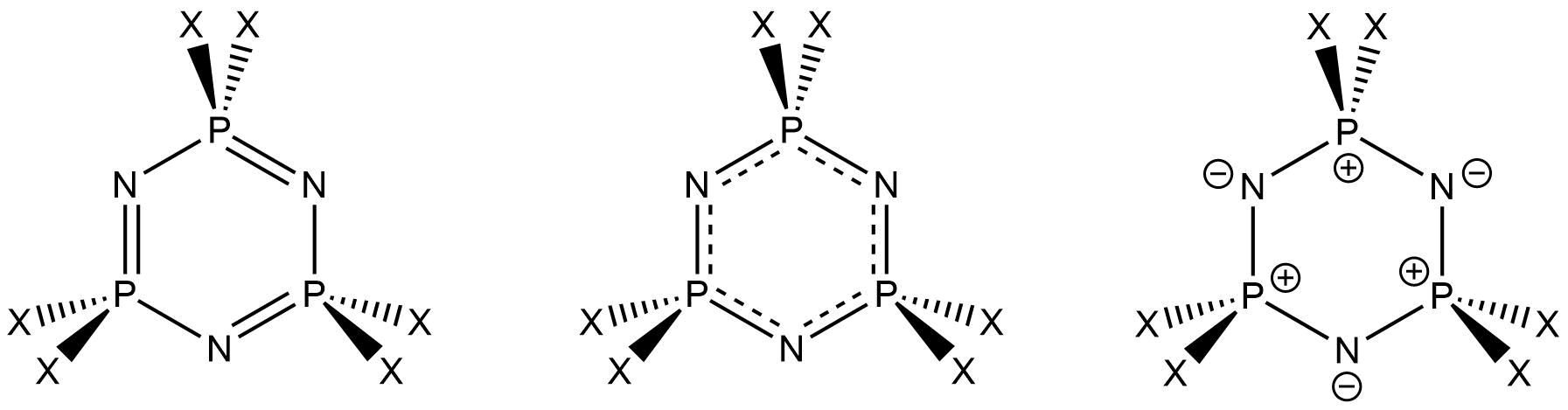
Depictions of P–N bonding in a general cyclotriphosphazene: left, a representation of alternating single and double P–N bonds (does not account for equal bond lengths), used as a matter of convention; middle, the earlier proposed delocalised ring system (discredited due to infeasibility of P 3d participation); right, the most accurate description to current knowledge, where the majority of the bonding is ionic

=== Early analyses ===
Cyclophosphazenes such as hexachlorophosphazene are distinguished by notable stability and equal P–N bond lengths which, in many such cyclic molecules, would imply delocalization or even aromaticity. To account for these features, early bonding models starting from the mid-1950s invoked a delocalised π system arising from the overlap of N 2p and P 3d orbitals.

=== Modern bonding models ===
Starting from the late 1980s, more modern calculations and the lack of spectroscopic evidence reveal that the P 3d contribution is negligible, invalidating the earlier hypothesis. Instead, a charge separated model is generally accepted.

According to this description, the P–N bond is viewed as a very polarised one (between notional P^{+} and N^{−}), with sufficient ionic character to account for most of the bond strength.

The rest (~15%) of the bond strength may be attributed to a negative hyperconjugation interaction: the N lone pairs can donate some electron density into π-accepting σ* molecular orbitals on the P.

== Synthesis ==
The synthesis of hexachlorophosphazene was first reported by von Liebig in 1834. In that report he describes experiments conducted with Wöhler. They found that phosphorus pentachloride (PCl_{5}) and ammonia (NH_{3}) react exothermically to yield a new substance that could be washed with cold water to remove the ammonium chloride ([NH_{4}]Cl) coproduct. The new compound contained P, N, and Cl, on the basis of elemental analysis. It was sensitive toward hydrolysis by hot water.

Modern syntheses are based on the developments by Schenk and Römer who used ammonium chloride in place of ammonia and inert chlorinated solvents. By replacing ammonia with ammonium chloride allows the reaction to proceed without a strong exothermic reaction associated with the NH_{3}/PCl_{5}. Typical chlorocarbon solvents are 1,1,2,2-tetrachloroethane or chlorobenzene, which tolerate the hydrogen chloride (HCl) side product. Since ammonium chloride is insoluble in chlorinated solvents, workup is facilitated. For the reaction under such conditions, the following stoichiometry applies:

n [NH_{4}]Cl + n PCl_{5} → (NPCl_{2})_{n} + n HCl

where n can usually take values of 2 (the dimer tetrachlorodiphosphazene), 3 (the trimer hexachlorotriphosphazene), and 4 (the tetramer octachlorotetraphosphazene).

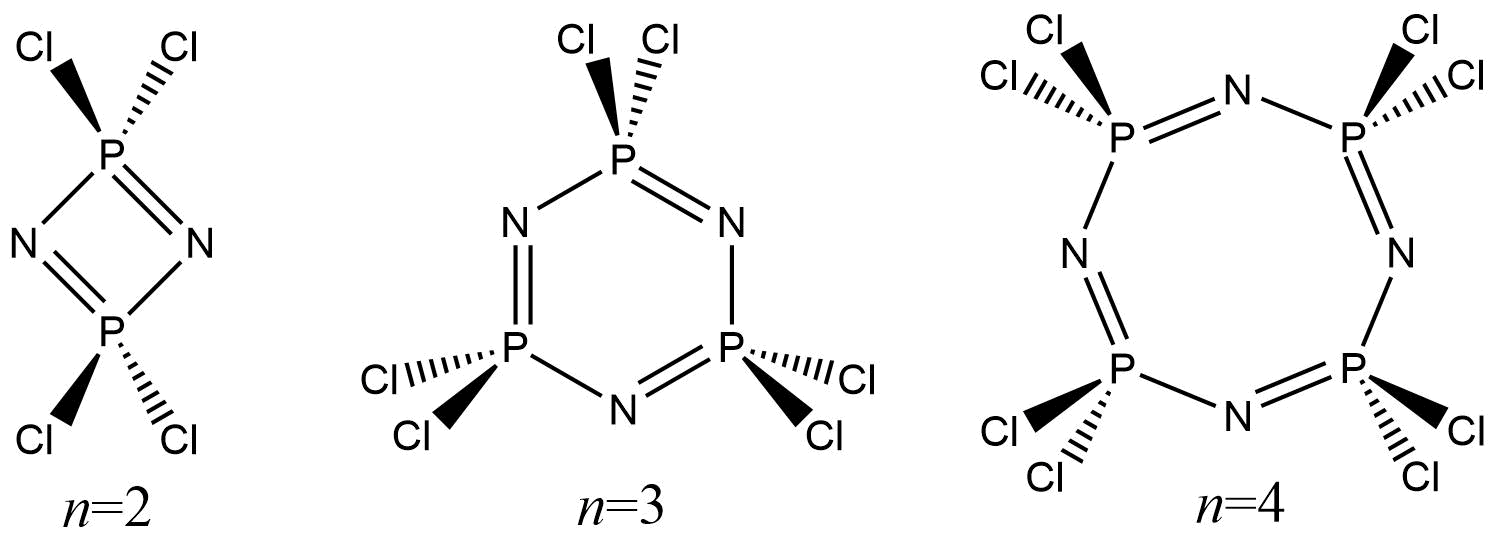
The three major cyclophosphazene products resulting from the reaction of phosphorus pentachloride and ammonium chloride

Purification by sublimation gives mainly the trimer and tetramer. Slow vacuum sublimation at approximately 60 °C affords the pure trimer free of the tetramer. Reaction conditions such as temperature may also be tuned to maximise the yield of the trimer at the expense of the other possible products; nonetheless, commercial samples of hexachlorophosphazene usually contain appreciable amounts of octachlorotetraphosphazene, even up to 40%.

=== Formation mechanism ===
The mechanism of the above reaction has not been resolved, but it has been suggested that PCl_{5} is found in its ionic form [PCl_{4}]^{+}[PCl_{6}]^{−} (tetrachlorophosphonium hexachlorophosphate(V)) and the reaction proceeds via nucleophilic attack of [PCl_{4}]^{+} (tetrachlorophosphonium) by NH_{3} (from [NH_{4}]Cl dissociation). Elimination of HCl (the major side product) creates a reactive nucleophilic intermediate

NH_{3} + [PCl_{4}]^{+} → HN=PCl_{3} + HCl + H^{+}

which through further attack of [PCl_{4}]^{+} and subsequent HCl elimination, creates a growing acyclic intermediate

HN=PCl_{3} + [PCl_{4}]^{+} → [Cl_{3}P−N=PCl_{3}]^{+} + HCl
NH_{3} + [Cl_{3}P−N=PCl_{3}]^{+} → HN=PCl_{2}−N=PCl_{3} + HCl + H^{+}, etc.

until an eventual intramolecular attack leads to the formation of one of the cyclic oligomers.

== Reactions ==
=== Substitution at P ===
Hexachlorophosphazene reacts readily with alkali metal alkoxides and amides.

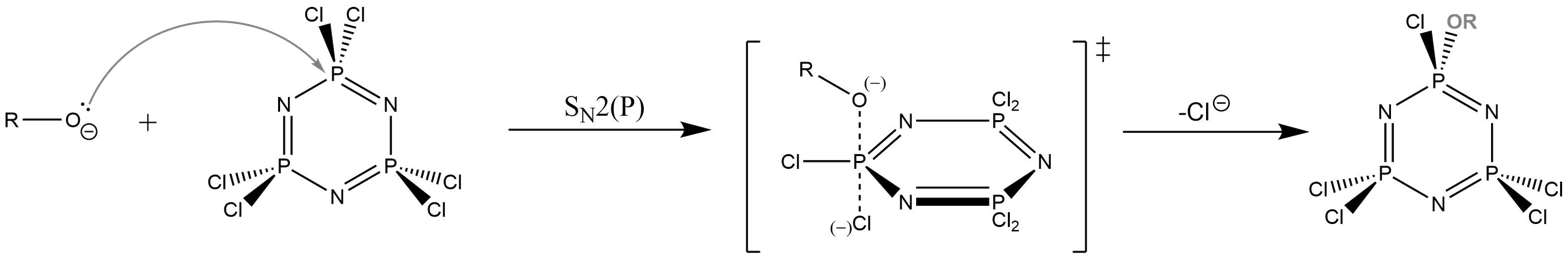
A SN2 substitution at hexachlorotriphosphazene. A trigonal bipyramidal transition state is proposed.

The nucleophilic polysubstitution of chloride by alkoxide proceeds via displacement of chloride at separate phosphorus centers:

(NPCl_{2})_{3} + 3 NaOR → (NPCl(OR))_{3} + 3 NaCl
(NPCl(OR))_{3} + 3 NaOR → (NP(OR)_{2})_{3} + 3 NaCl

The observed regioselectivity is due to the combined steric effects and oxygen lone pair π-backdonation (which deactivates already substituted P atoms).

=== Ring-opening polymerisation ===
Heating hexachlorophosphazene to ca. 250 °C induces polymerisation. The tetramer also polymerises in this manner, although more slowly. The conversion is a type of ring-opening polymerisation (ROP). The ROP mechanism is found to be catalysed by Lewis acids, but is overall not very well understood. Prolonged heating of the polymer at higher temperatures (ca. 350 °C) will cause depolymerisation.

The structure of the inorganic chloropolymer product (Poly(dichlorophosphazene)) comprises a linear –(N=P(−Cl)_{2}−)_{n} chain, where n ~ 15000. It was first observed in the late 19th century and its form after chain cross-linking has been called "inorganic rubber" due to its elastomeric behaviour.

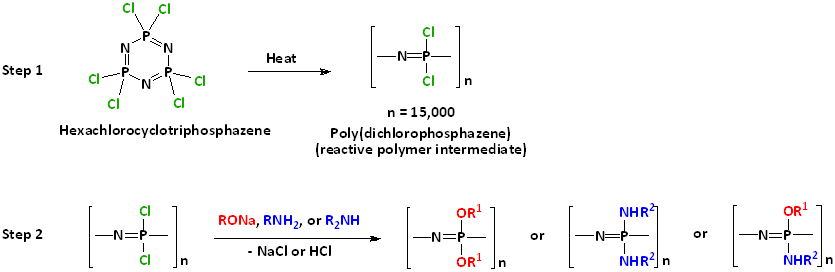
Hexachlorotriphosphazene ROP and subsequent nucleophilic substitution for desired polyphosphazene synthesis

This polydichlorophosphazene product is the starting material for a wide class of polymeric compounds, collectively known as polyphosphazenes. Substitution of the chloride groups by other nucleophilic groups, especially alkoxides as laid out above, yields numerous characterised derivatives.

=== Lewis basicity ===
The nitrogen centres of hexachlorophosphazene are weakly basic, and this Lewis base behaviour has been suggested to play a role in the polymerisation mechanism. Specifically, hexachlorophosphazene has been reported to form adducts of various stoichiometries with Lewis acids AlCl_{3}, AlBr_{3}, GaCl_{3}, SO_{3}, TaCl_{5}, VOCl_{3}, but no isolable product with BCl_{3}.

Among these, the best structurally characterised are the 1:1 adducts with aluminium trichloride or with gallium trichloride; they are found with the Al/Ga atom bound to a N and assume a more prominently distorted chair conformation compared to the free hexachlorophosphazene. The adducts also exhibit fluxional behaviour in solution for temperatures down to −60 °C, which can be monitored with ^{15}N and ^{31}P-NMR.

=== Coupling reagent ===
Hexachlorophosphazene has also found applications in research by enabling aromatic coupling reactions between pyridine and either N,N-dialkylanilines or indole, resulting in 4,4'-substituted phenylpyridine derivatives, postulated to go through a cyclophosphazene pyridinium salt intermediate.

The compound may also be used as a peptide coupling reagent for the synthesis of oligopeptides in chloroform, though for this application the tetramer octachlorotetraphosphazene usually proves more effective.

=== Photochemical degradation ===
Both the trimer and tetramer in hydrocarbon solutions photochemically react forming clear liquids identified as alkyl-substituted derivatives (NPCl_{2−x}R_{x})_{n}, where n = 3, 4. Such reactions proceed under prolonged UVC (mercury arc) illumination without affecting the P_{n}N_{n} rings. Solid films of the trimer and tetramer will not undergo any chemical change under such irradiation conditions.

== Applications ==
The hexalkoxyphosphazenes (especially the aryloxy species), resulting from the nucleophilic hexasubstitution of the hexachlorophosphazene P atoms, have attracted interest for their high thermal and chemical stability as well as their low glass transition temperature. Certain hexalkoxyphosphazenes (such as the hexa-phenoxy derivative) have been put to commercial use as fireproof materials and high temperature lubricants.

Polyphosphazenes obtained from polymerised hexachlorophosphazene (poly(dichlorophosphazene)) have garnered attention within the field of inorganic polymers. The elastomeric and thermoplastic properties have been investigated. Some of them appear promising for future applications as fibre- or membrane-forming high performance materials, since they combine transparency, backbone flexibility, tunable hydrophilicity or hydrophobicity, and various other desirable properties.

Polyphosphazene-based components have been used in O-rings, fuel lines and shock absorbers, where the polyphosphazenes confer fire resistance, imperviousness to oils, and flexibility even at very low temperatures.
