= Organic base =

An organic base is an organic compound which acts as a base. Organic bases are usually, but not always, proton acceptors. They usually contain nitrogen atoms, which can easily be protonated. For example, amines or nitrogen-containing heterocyclic compounds have a lone pair of electrons on the nitrogen atom and can thus act as proton acceptors. Examples include:

- pyridine
- alkylamines, such as methylamine
- imidazole
- benzimidazole
- histidine
- guanidine
- phosphazene bases
- hydroxides of quaternary ammonium cations or some other organic cations

== Factors affecting alkalinity ==
Most organic bases are considered to be weak. Many factors can affect the strength of the compounds. One such factor is the inductive effect. A simple explanation of the term would state that electropositive atoms (such as carbon groups) attached in close proximity to the potential proton acceptor have an "electron-releasing" effect, such that the positive charge acquired by the proton acceptor is distributed over other adjacent atoms in the chain. The converse is also possible as alleviation of alkalinity: electronegative atoms or species (such as fluorine or the nitro group) will have an "electron-withdrawal" effect and thereby reduce the basicity. To this end, trimethylamine is a more potent base than merely ammonia, due to the inductive effect of the methyl groups allowing the nitrogen atom to more readily accept a proton and become a cation being much greater than that of the hydrogen atoms. In guanidines, the protonated form (guanidinium) has three resonance structures, giving it increased stability and making guanidines stronger bases.

Phosphazene bases also contain phosphorus and are, in general, more alkaline than standard amines and nitrogen-based heterocyclics. Protonation takes place at the nitrogen atom, not the phosphorus atom to which the nitrogen is double-bonded.

== Hydroxide donors ==
Some organic bases, such as tetramethylammonium hydroxide, tetrabutylammonium hydroxide, or choline hydroxide are hydroxide donors rather than proton acceptors like the above compounds. However, they are not always stable. Choline hydroxide, for example, is metastable and slowly breaks down to release trimethylamine.
