= Octachlorotetraphosphazene =

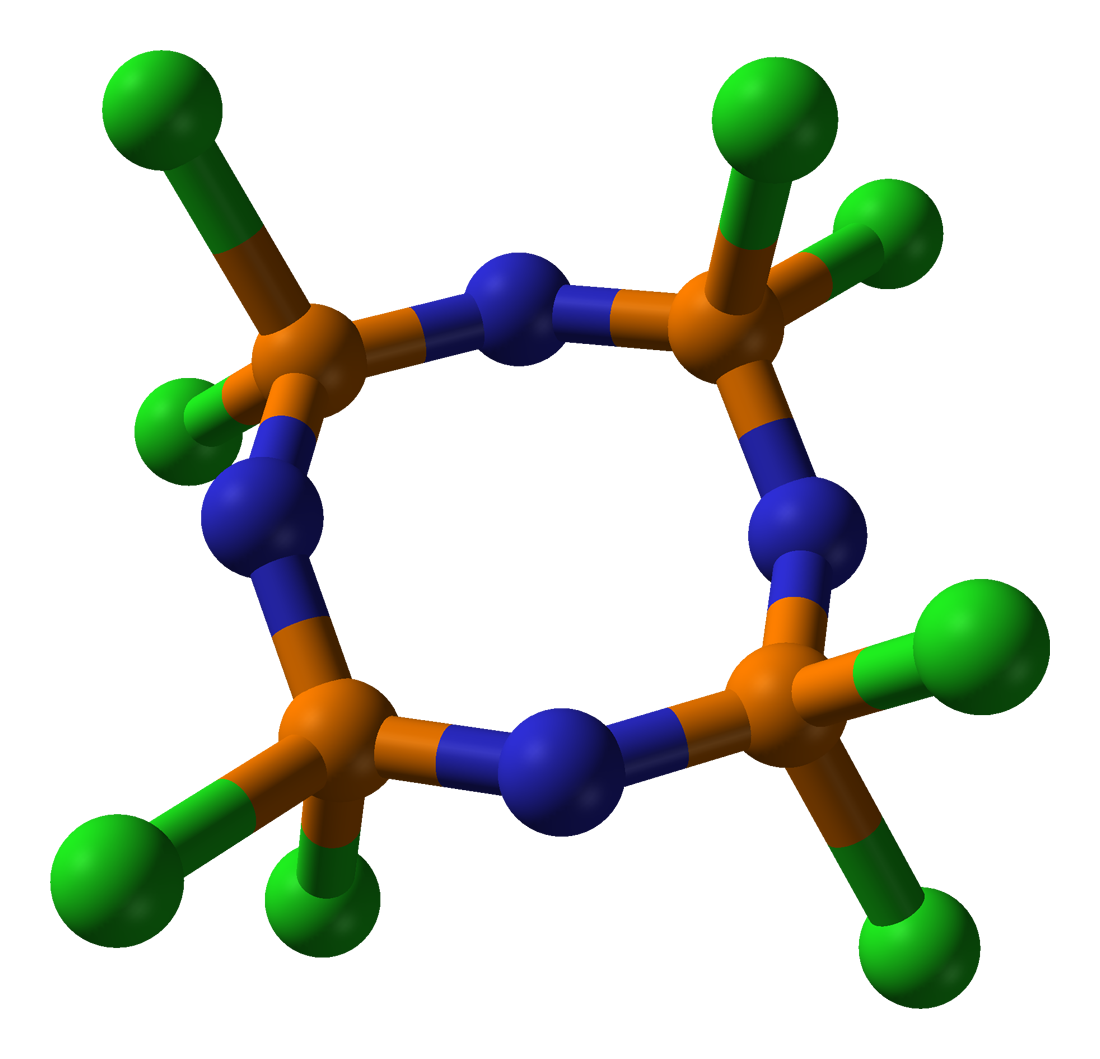
Octachlorotetraphosphazene structure (ball-and-stick)

Names
- IUPAC name 2,2,4,4,6,6,8,8-Octachloro-1,3,5,7,2λ^{5},4λ^{5},6λ^{5},8λ^{5}-tetrazatetraphosphocine
- Other names Phosphonitrilic chloride tetramer Octachlorocyclotetraphosphazene; Tetraphosphonitrilic chloride 2,2,4,4,6,6,8,8-octachloro-2,2,4,4,6,6,8,8-octahydro-1,3,5,7,2,4,6,8-tetraazatetraphosphocine 2,2,4,4,6,6,8,8-octachloro-1,3,5,7-tetraza-2λ^{5},4λ^{5},6λ^{5},8λ^{5}-tetraphosphacycloocta-1,3,5,7-tetraene

Identifiers
CAS Number	2950-45-0
3D model (JSmol)	Interactive image
ChEMBL	ChEMBL3344300
ChemSpider	68764
EC Number	220-972-1
PubChem CID	76285
CompTox Dashboard (EPA)	DTXSID7062740
- InChI: InChI=1S/Cl8N4P4/c1-13(2)9-14(3,4)11-16(7,8)12-15(5,6)10-13 Key: PEJQKHLWXHKKGS-UHFFFAOYSA-N
- SMILES: N1=P(N=P(N=P(N=P1(Cl)Cl)(Cl)Cl)(Cl)Cl)(Cl)Cl

Properties
Chemical formula	N_{4}Cl_{8}P_{4}
Molar mass	463.55 g/mol
Appearance	Colorless solid
Density	2.27 g/mL at -173 °C
Melting point	123 to 124 °C (253 to 255 °F; 396 to 397 K)
Boiling point	188 °C at 15 Torr
Solubility in water	Decomposes
Solubility in hexane	7.0 g/100g (20 °C)
Solubility in toluene	1.8 g/100g (20 °C)
Solubility in CCl4	1.6 g/100g (20 °C)
Refractive index (n_{D})	1.675 (589 nm)

Structure
Crystal structure	Tetragonal
Space group	86
Point group	D_{4h}
Dipole moment	0.39 D

Thermochemistry
Std enthalpy of formation (Δ_{f}H^{⦵}_{298})	-1084.9 kJ·mol^{−1}
Enthalpy of vaporization (Δ_{f}H_{vap})	64.9 kJ·mol^{−1} (325 °C)
Enthalpy of sublimation (Δ_{f}H_{sublim})	95.9–97.5 kJ·mol^{−1}

Hazards
- Occupational safety and health (OHS/OSH)
Main hazards	Mild irritant
- GHS labelling
Pictograms	(GHS05: Corrosive)
Signal word	Danger
Hazard statements	H314
Precautionary statements	P260, P280, P304+P340, P305+P351+P338, P363
Flash point	Non-flammable

Related compounds
Related compounds	Hexachlorophosphazene
- Except where otherwise noted, data are given for materials in their standard state (at 25 °C [77 °F], 100 kPa). Infobox references

Octachlorotetraphosphazene is an inorganic compound with the formula (NPCl_{2})_{4}. The molecule has a cyclic, unsaturated backbone consisting of alternating phosphorus and nitrogen centers, and can be viewed as a tetramer of the hypothetical compound N≡PCl_{2}.

The compound has not been studied as much as the related species hexachlorotriphosphazene, in the samples of which octachlorotetraphosphazene is usually found as an unwanted contamintant.

== Structure and bonding ==
Octachlorotetraphosphazene has a P_{4}N_{4} core with six equivalent P–N bonds.

== Synthesis ==
NH_{4}Cl + PCl_{5} → 1/n (NPCl_{2})_{n} + HCl

== Reactions ==
=== Substitution at P ===
Some spiro-, ansa-, and spiro-ansa-cyclic derivatives have been prepared via nucleophilic substitution of octachlorotetraphosphazene with alkoxides.
