= Tris(trimethylsilyl)amine =

Names
- Preferred IUPAC name 1,1,1-Trimethyl-N,N-bis(trimethylsilyl)silanamine

Identifiers
CAS Number	1586-73-8
3D model (JSmol)	Interactive image
ChemSpider	66724
ECHA InfoCard	100.014.951
EC Number	216-445-0
PubChem CID	74110
UNII	SVA5FGS9US
CompTox Dashboard (EPA)	DTXSID2061802
- InChI: InChI=1S/C9H27NSi3/c1-11(2,3)10(12(4,5)6)13(7,8)9/h1-9H3 Key: PEGHITPVRNZWSI-UHFFFAOYSA-N
- SMILES: C[Si](C)(C)N([Si](C)(C)C)[Si](C)(C)C

Properties
Chemical formula	C_{9}H_{27}NSi_{3}
Molar mass	233.57g/mol
Appearance	Waxy solid
Melting point	67–69°C
Boiling point	215°C (85°C at 13mmHg)
Solubility	Nonpolar organic solvents
- Except where otherwise noted, data are given for materials in their standard state (at 25 °C [77 °F], 100 kPa). Infobox references

Tris(trimethylsilyl)amine is the simplest tris(trialkylsilyl)amine, which have the general formula (R_{3}Si)_{3}N, in which all three hydrogen atoms of the ammonia are replaced by trimethylsilyl groups (-Si(CH_{3})_{3}). Tris(trimethylsilyl)amine has been for years in the center of scientific interest as a stable intermediate in chemical nitrogen fixation (i. e. the conversion of atmospheric nitrogen N_{2} into organic substrates under normal conditions).

== Production ==
Early attempts to prepare tris(trimethylsilyl)amine from ammonia and trimethylchlorosilane (TMS-Cl) were unsuccessful even at temperatures of 500 °C and in the presence of the base pyridine. The reaction of ammonia and trimethylchlorosilane stops at the stage of the doubly silylated product bis(trimethylsilyl)amine (usually referred to as hexamethyldisilazane, HMDS).

Synthese von Hexamethyldisilazan (HMDS)

Tris(trimethylsilyl)amine is obtained by reaction of the sodium salt of hexamethyldisilazane - from hexamethyldisilazane and sodium amide or from hexamethyldisilazane, sodium and styrene - with trimethylchlorosilane in 80% yield.

[(CH_{3})_{3}Si]_{2}NH + NaNH_{2} → NH_{3} + NaN[Si(CH_{3})_{3}]_{2} ( + ClSi(CH_{3})_{3} ) → NaCl + N[Si(CH_{3})_{3}]_{3}

The lithium salt of hexamethyldisilazane - from hexamethyldisilazane and butyllithium or from hexamethyldisilazane and phenyllithium - reacts with trimethylchlorosilane only in yields of 50-60% to tris(trimethylsilyl)amine.

The reaction of lithium nitride with trimethylchlorosilane can be carried out as a one-pot reaction in THF with 72% yield.

Li_{3}N + 3Me_{3}SiCl → N(Me_{3}Si)_{3} + 3LiCl

== Properties ==
Tris(trimethylsilyl)amine is a colorless, crystalline or waxy solid which is stable to water and bases. Alcohols or acids though cleave the Si-N-bond under formation of ammonia.

== Applications ==
=== Tris(trimethylsilyl)amine as a synthetic building block ===
From antimony trichloride and tris(trimethylsilyl)amine, a nitridoantimone cubane-type cluster can be formed almost quantitatively at –60 °C.

Ketones can be trifluoromethylated in the presence of P_{4}-t-Bu and nonamethyltrisilazane under mild conditions in yields of up to 84% with the inert fluoroform (HCF_{3}, HFC-23).

The monomer trichloro(trimethylsilyl)-phosphoranimine Cl_{3}P=NSiMe_{3} is formed from tris(trimethylsilyl)amine and phosphorus pentachloride in hexane at 0 °C,

Synthese von Trichlor(trimethylsilyl)phosphoranimin

which can be polymerized to linear polydichlorophosphazenes with defined molecular weights and polydispersities.

The cyclic trimer (NPCl_{2})_{3} hexachlorocyclotriphosphane is predominantly formed from tris(trimethylsilyl)amine and phosphorus pentachloride in boiling dichloromethane (about 40 °C) among other oligomers which gives upon heating over 250 °C high molecular weight, little defined polydichlorophosphazenes.

Synthese von Hexachlorcyclotriphosphan

Nitrogen trifluoride NF_{3} (which is used, inter alia, for the plasma etching of silicon wafers) is obtainable from tris(trimethylsilyl)amine and fluorine at –40 °C in acetonitrile, suppressing the formation of nitrogen and tetrafluorohydrazine, which are produced as undesirable by-products during the standard synthesis of nitrogen trifluoride from ammonia or ammonium fluoride.

Synthese von NF_{3}

=== Tris(trimethylsilyl)amine intermediate in chemical nitrogen fixation ===
The technical nitrogen fixation was made possible by the Haber-Bosch process, in which nitrogen is converted into ammonia by reductive protonation in the presence of iron catalysts under high pressures (> 150 bar) and temperatures (> 400 °C). In chemical nitrogen fixation (i.e., the transformation of atmospheric nitrogen under normal conditions into reactive starting materials for chemical syntheses, usually also ammonia), tris(trimethylsilyl)amine plays an important role in the so-called reductive silylation, since it is hydrolyzed with water to ammonia.

$$\ce{ {N2} + {6e^-} ->[\ce{Catalyst:}\ \ce{Mo},\ \ce{Fe},\ \ce{Co}]}
\begin{cases}
\ce{->[\ce{H+}]} &\ce{2NH3}\\{}\\
\ce{->[\ce{R3Si-X}][-\,\ce{X-}]} &\ce{2N(SiR3)3}
\end{cases}$$

As early as 1895 it was observed that metallic lithium reacts with nitrogen to lithium nitride at room temperature. In 1972, K. Shiina observed that lithium (as an electron donor) forms with trimethylsilyl chloride under darkening tris(trimethylsilyl)amine in the presence of chromium(III) chloride as a catalyst at room temperature with the nitrogen used for inerting.

$$\ce{N2 + 6Me3SiCl + 6}\,{\color{NavyBlue}\ce{Li}}\ \ce{->[\ce{CrCl3}] 2N(SiMe3)3 + 6}\,{\color{NavyBlue}\ce{Li}}\ce{Cl}$$

More recently, for the reductive silylation of N_{2}, sodium has been used instead of lithium as the electron donor and molybdenum and iron compounds (such as pentacarbonyl iron or ferrocenes) as catalysts, up to 34 equivalents of N(Me_{3}Si)_{3} could be obtained per iron atom in the catalyst.

$$\ce{N2 + 6Me3SiCl + 6}\,{\color{Red}\ce{Na}}\ \ce{->[\ce{Fe-catalyst}] 2N(SiMe3)3 + 6}\,{\color{Red}\ce{Na}}\ce{Cl}$$

With a molybdenum-ferrocene complex as catalyst, a turnover number of up to 226 could be achieved.

$${\color{Red}\ce{N2}} + {\color{NavyBlue}\ce{Me3Si}}\ce{{Cl} + Na ->[\ce{Mo/Fe-catalyst}.][\ce{RT}\atop (1\ \ce{atm})]}\
{\color{Red}\ce{N}}{\color{NavyBlue}\ce{(Me3Si)3}}$$

The catalytic productivity of the catalysts for chemical nitrogen fixation developed so far is, despite intensive research, still by magnitude smaller than, for example, the modern polymerization catalysts of the metallocene type or enzymes.
