= Cyclodiphosphazane =

Class of chemical compounds

Cyclodiphosphazanes are saturated four membered P_{2}N_{2} ring systems and one of the major classes of cyclic phosphazene compounds. Bis(chloro)cyclodiphosphazanes, (cis-[ClP(μ-NR)]_{2}) are important starting compounds for synthesizing a variety of cyclodiphosphazane derivatives by nucleophilic substitution reactions; are prepared by reaction of phosphorus trichloride (PCl_{3}) with a primary amine (RNH_{2}) or amine hydrochlorides (RNH_{3}Cl).

Organic substituents on nitrogen play an important role in formation of cyclic phosphazane compounds. The cyclic tetramers and trimer are formed with methyl and ethyl substituents on nitrogen, whereas formation of cyclic dimers (cis-[ClP(μ-NR)]_{2}) have been observed exclusively with more sterically demanding primary amines such as tert-butylamine and aniline.

== Coordination Chemistry ==
Cyclodiphosphazanes are excellent ligand systems for metallosupramolecular chemistry. The cis-oriented lone pair on phosphorus in cyclodiphosphazane are projected away from each other, so chelation to metal center is not possible. This bridging coordination of cyclodiphosphazane allows formation of metallomacrocycles containing four rhodium and gold centers and metallopolymers CuX, AgX.

Chiral cyclodiphosphazanes have found use as ligands in asymmetric catalysis. Gade et al. employed them in enantioselective transition-metal mediated catalysis, while Goldfuss et al. employed di-amino substituted chiral variants in hydrogen bonding catalysis.

Cyclodiphosphazanes have also been found to have a high ability to bind anions via hydrogen bonding - specifically halides - in both their monomeric and macrocyclic forms. They are competitive to or better than comparable bifurcated anion binding structural motifs such as (thio)urea and squaramide.
