= Harry R. Allcock =

English academic

- Born: 8 April 1932 (age 94); Loughborough, England
- Education: University of London
- Scientific career
- Fields: Chemistry
- Workplaces: Pennsylvania State University

Harry R. Allcock (born 8 April 1932, Loughborough, England) is Atherton Professor of chemistry at Pennsylvania State University in the United States.

Allcock obtained his B.Sc. in 1953 and his Ph.D. in 1956, both at the University of London. He is notable for his work on the "inorganic rubbers" with a phosphorus-nitrogen backbone (polyphosphazenes). With James E. Mark and Robert West, Allcock co-authored the book Inorganic Polymers (Oxford University Press, 2005). He also wrote Introduction to Materials Chemistry (John Wiley & Sons, 2008), Phosphorus-Nitrogen Compounds Cyclic, Linear, and High Polymeric Systems (Academic Press, 1972), Chemistry and Applications of Polyphosphazenes (Wiley-Interscience, 2002, and co-authored Contemporary Polymer Chemistry (Prentice Hall, 2003) with Fred Lampe and James Mark.

Allcock was elected as a member into the National Academy of Engineering in 2014 for the development of polyphosphazenes, a new class of biomaterials.

== Awards and honors ==
- American Chemical Society National Award in Polymer Chemistry (1984)
- Guggenheim Fellow (1986/1987)
- American Institute of Chemists Chemical Pioneer Award (1989)
- American Chemical Society National Award in Materials Chemistry (1992)
- A.C.S. Herman Mark Award in Polymer Chemistry (1994)
- Penn State Graduate Commencement Speaker (1997 & 2005)
- Honorary degree from Loughborough University, U.K. (2006)
- American Chemical Society National Award in Applied Polymer Science (2007)
- National Academy of Engineering member (2014)

== See also ==
- Poly(dichlorophosphazene)
