= VinylPlus =

Vinyl research programme

- Predecessor: Vinyl 2010
- Formation: 22 June 2011
- Founder: ECVM, EuPC, ESPA, European Plasticisers
- Type: Sustainability programme
- Headquarters: Brussels, Belgium
- Region served: EU28 + Norway & Switzerland
- General Manager: Dr. Brigitte Dero
- Chairman: Stefan Sommer
- Website: http://www.vinylplus.eu

VinylPlus was founded by the European Council of Vinyl Manufacturers (ECVM), the European Stabiliser Producers Association (ESPA), European Plasticisers and the European Plastics Converters (EuPC) in 2011 when the PVC industry renewed a previous initiative called Vinyl 2010. VinylPlus is a ten-year, industry-wide voluntary commitment to develop more ecologically responsible ways to produce, use and recycle PVC. The programme aligns with the principles and targets of the UN’s Sustainable Development Goals (SDGs) and the circular economy.

VinylPlus includes all European PVC industry sectors: resin and additives producers, as well as plastics converters and recyclers. It covers the EU-28 plus Norway and Switzerland.

VinylPlus is included in the Rio+20 Registry of Commitments, and is a member of the Green Industry Platform, the global partnership led by the United Nations Industrial Development Organization (UNIDO) and the United Nations Environment Platform Programme (UNEP). VinylPlus is also registered as a partner on the UN Partnerships for SDGs platform where it is recognised as fulfilling the SMART criteria.

== History ==
VinylPlus succeeded Vinyl 2010, which was the European PVC industry's first voluntary commitment. Vinyl 2010 was set up in 2000 around the principles of Responsible Care adopted by the European chemicals industry in the 1980s . Its programme aimed to shift the PVC industry to a more sustainable model by improving recycling and substituting hazardous additives.

At the same time, the European Union also started addressing environmental concerns about plastics, notably developing the Waste Framework Directive (EU Directive 2008/98/EC), which laid down key EU recycling rules.

Vinyl 2010 also set up a monitoring committee, which was kept upon the creation of VinylPlus. The committee was designed as an independent verification of the programme's activities, and includes representatives from the European Commission, the European Parliament, trade unions, consumer associations and academia.

== Recycling ==
One aspect of the programme is to improve recycling figures. VinylPlus sets public recycling targets that it publishes online and in an annual progress report. VinylPlus accredits Recovinyl to helping with recycling. Recovinyl was set up by VinylPlus in 2003, and is an industry-wide platform that gathers European recyclers and converters.

== The VinylPlus Sustainability Forum ==
VinylPlus organises an annual forum: The VinylPlus Sustainability Forum. The first one took place in Istanbul in 2013. The event aims to encourage dialogue on sustainability by assembling representatives from the PVC industry, policy makers, consumer groups, retailers, architects, designers, recyclers and NGOs. The themes from past forums have been:

- 2013: Smart, Sustainable and Inclusive Growth for Europe and Beyond
- 2014: Enhancing the Value of Partnerships
- 2015: More Vinyl, Less Carbon
- 2016: Smart Vinyl For Our Cities
- 2017: Towards Circular Economy
- 2018: Meeting Societal Needs
- 2019: Accelerating Innovation.

== Governance ==
VinylPlus's management Board represents all European PVC industry sectors: resin and additives producers, as well as plastics converters. The Monitoring Committee offers guidance and advice, while ensuring an independent evaluation of the initiatives undertaken in the Voluntary Commitment. The Monitoring Committee currently includes representatives from the European Commission, the European Parliament, trade unions, consumer associations and academia, as well as representatives from the European PVC industry. The Monitoring Committee's stated goal is to ensure VinylPlus's transparency, participation and accountability.
