= Polyvinyl chloride =

Common synthetic polymer

- Repeating unit of PVC polymer chain.

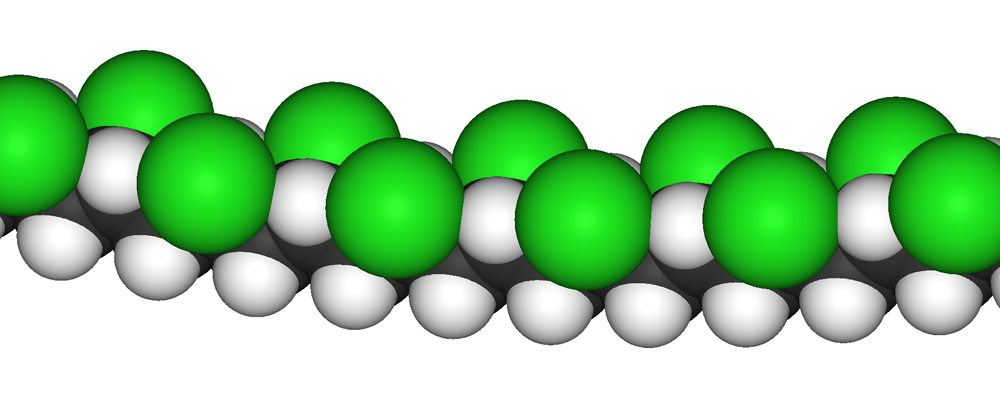
- Space-filling model of a part of a PVC chain

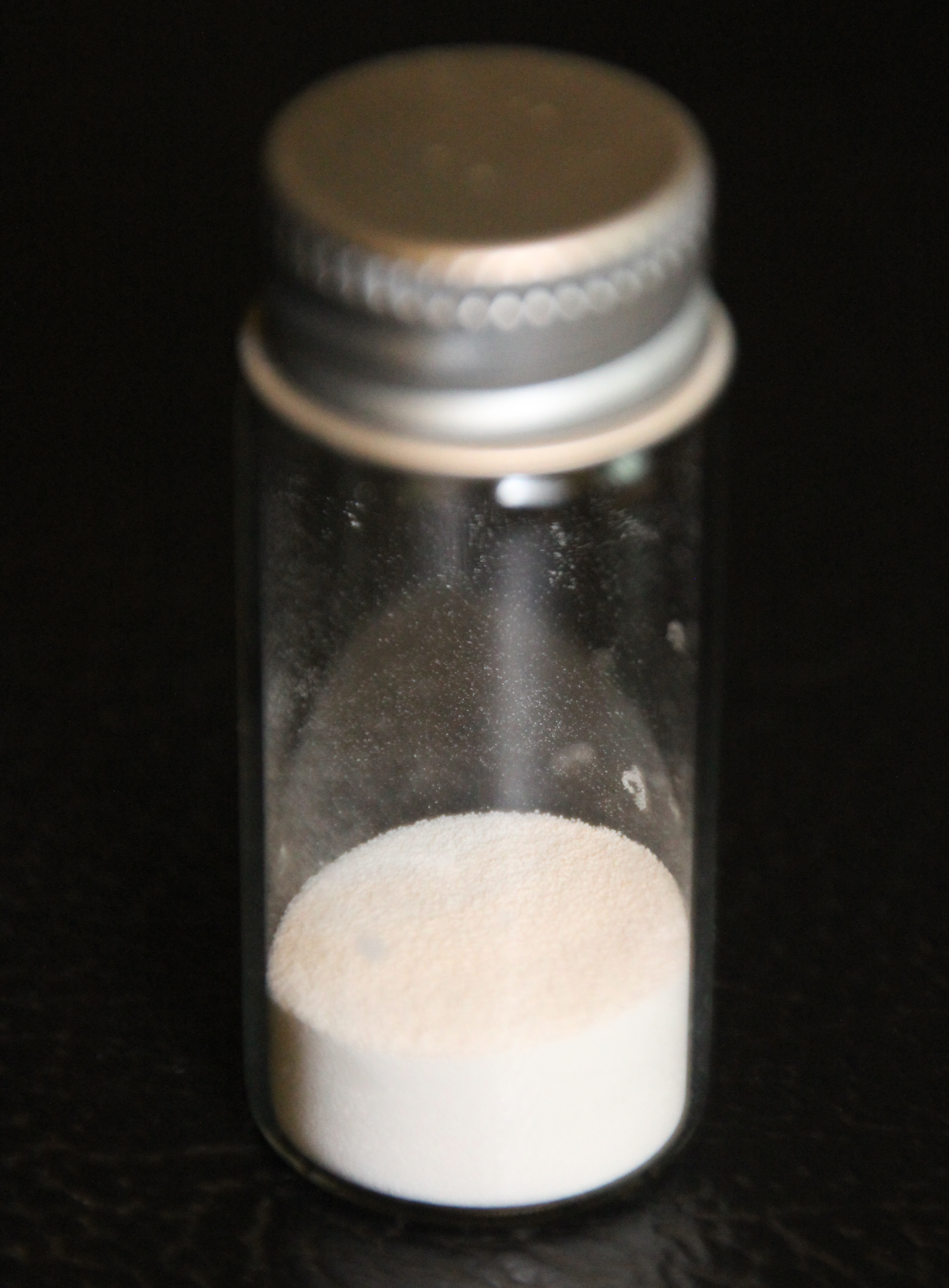
- Pure PVC powder, containing no plasticizer

Names
- IUPAC name poly(1-chloroethylene)
- Other names Polychloroethene

Identifiers
| CAS Number | 9002-86-2 |
| Abbreviations | PVC |
| ChEBI | CHEBI:53243 |
| ChemSpider | none |
| ECHA InfoCard | 100.120.191 |
| KEGG | C19508 |
| MeSH | Polyvinyl+Chloride |
| CompTox Dashboard (EPA) | DTXSID5025940 |

Properties
| Chemical formula | (C_{2}H_{3}Cl)_{n} |
| Appearance | white, brittle solid |
| Odor | odorless |
| Density | 1.4 g/cm^{3} |
| Solubility in water | insoluble |
| Solubility in ethanol | insoluble |
| Solubility in tetrahydrofuran | slightly soluble |
| Magnetic susceptibility (χ) | −10.71×10^{−6} (SI, 22 °C) |

Hazards
| NFPA 704 (fire diamond) | 1 1 0 |
| Threshold limit value (TLV) | 10 mg/m^{3} (inhalable), 3 mg/m^{3} (respirable) (TWA) |
- NIOSH (US health exposure limits)
| PEL (Permissible) | 15 mg/m^{3} (inhalable), 5 mg/m^{3} (respirable) (TWA) |
- Except where otherwise noted, data are given for materials in their standard state (at 25 °C [77 °F], 100 kPa). Infobox references

Mechanical properties
| Elongation at break | 20–40% |
| Notch test | 2–5 kJ/m^{2} |
| Glass Transition Temperature | 82 °C (180 °F) |
| Melting point | 100 °C (212 °F) to 260 °C (500 °F) |
| Effective heat of combustion | 17.95 MJ/kg |
| Specific heat (c) | 0.9 kJ/(kg·K) |
| Water absorption (ASTM) | 0.04–0.4 |
| Dielectric Breakdown Voltage | 40 MV/m |

Polyvinyl chloride, alternatively poly(vinyl chloride), colloquially vinyl or polyvinyl, abbreviated PVC, is the world's third-most widely produced synthetic polymer of plastic (after polyethylene and polypropylene). About 40 million tons of PVC are produced each year.

PVC comes in rigid (sometimes abbreviated as RPVC) and flexible forms. Rigid PVC is used in construction for pipes, doors, and windows. It is also used in making plastic bottles, packaging, and bank or membership cards. Adding plasticizers makes PVC softer and more flexible. It is used in plumbing, electrical cable insulation, flooring, signage, phonograph records, inflatable products, and rubber substitutes. With cotton or linen, it is used in the production of canvas.

Polyvinyl chloride is a white, brittle solid. It is soluble in ketones, chlorinated solvents, dimethylformamide, THF and DMAc.

== Discovery ==
PVC was synthesized in 1872 by German chemist Eugen Baumann after extended investigation and experimentation. The polymer appeared as a white solid inside a flask of vinyl chloride that had been left on a shelf sheltered from sunlight for four weeks.

In the early 20th century, the Russian chemist Ivan Ostromislensky and Fritz Klatte of the German chemical company Griesheim-Elektron both attempted to use PVC in commercial products, but difficulties in processing the rigid, sometimes brittle polymer thwarted their efforts. Waldo Semon and the B.F. Goodrich Company developed a method in 1926 to plasticize PVC by blending it with various additives, including the use of dibutyl phthalate by 1933.

== Production ==
Polyvinyl chloride is produced by polymerization of the vinyl chloride monomer (VCM), as shown.

About 80% of production involves suspension polymerization. Emulsion polymerization accounts for about 12%, and bulk polymerization accounts for 8%. Suspension polymerization produces particles with average diameters of 100–180 μm, whereas emulsion polymerization gives much smaller particles of average size around 0.2 μm. VCM and water are introduced into the reactor along with a polymerization initiator and other additives. The contents of the reaction vessel are pressurized and continually mixed to maintain the suspension and ensure a uniform particle size of the PVC resin. The reaction is exothermic and thus requires cooling. As the volume is reduced during the reaction (PVC is denser than VCM), water is continually added to the mixture to maintain the suspension.

=== Microstructure ===
The polymers are linear and are strong. The monomers are mainly arranged head-to-tail, meaning that chloride is located on alternating carbon centres. PVC has mainly an atactic stereochemistry, which means that the relative stereochemistry of the chloride centres are random. Some degree of syndiotacticity of the chain gives a few percent crystallinity that is influential on the properties of the material.

About 57% of the mass of PVC is chlorine. The presence of chloride groups gives the polymer very different properties from the structurally related material polyethylene. At 1.4 g/cm^{3}, PVC's density is also higher than structurally related plastics such as polyethylene (0.88–0.96 g/cm^{3}) and polymethylmethacrylate (1.18 g/cm^{3}).

=== Producers ===
About half of the world's PVC production capacity is in China, despite the closure of many Chinese PVC plants due to issues complying with environmental regulations and poor capacities of scale. The largest single producer of PVC as of 2018 is Shin-Etsu Chemical of Japan, with a global share of around 30%.

== Additives ==
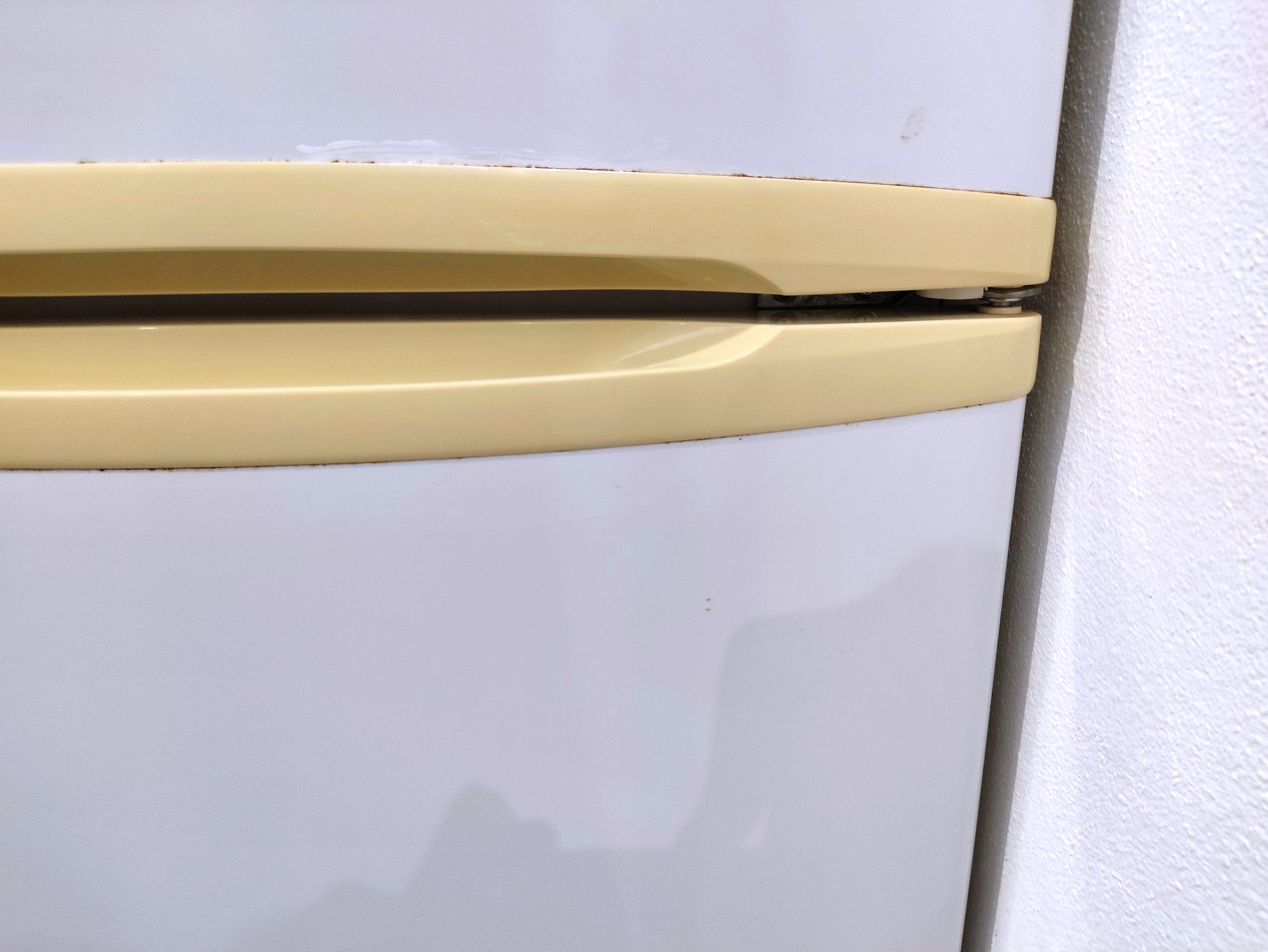
White PVC elements yellowing with age due to UV light exposure causing polymer degradation

The product of the polymerization process is unmodified PVC. Before PVC can be made into finished products, it always requires conversion into a compound by the incorporation of additives (but not necessarily all of the following) such as heat stabilizers, UV stabilizers, plasticizers, processing aids, impact modifiers, thermal modifiers, fillers, flame retardants, biocides, blowing agents and smoke suppressors, and, optionally, pigments.

The choice of additives used for the PVC finished product is controlled by the cost performance requirements of the end use specification (underground pipe, window frames, intravenous tubing and flooring all have very different ingredients to suit their performance requirements). Previously, polychlorinated biphenyls (PCBs) were added to certain PVC products as flame retardants and stabilizers.

=== Plasticizers ===
Among the common plastics, PVC is unique in its acceptance of large amounts of plasticizer, yielding physical properties that range continuously from a rigid solid to a soft gel, and almost 90% of all plasticizer production is used in making flexible PVC. The majority is used in films and cable sheathing. Flexible PVC can consist of over 85% plasticizer by mass, but unplasticized PVC (UPVC) should not contain any.

PVC properties as a function of phthalate plasticizer level
| | Plasticizer content (% DINP by weight) | Specific gravity (20 °C) | Shore hardness (type A, 15 s) | Flexural stiffness (Mpa) | Tensile strength (Mpa) | Elongation at break (%) | Example applications |
|---|---|---|---|---|---|---|---|
| Rigid | 0 | 1.4 | | 900 | 41 | <15 | Unplasticized PVC (UPVC): window frames and sills, doors, rigid pipe |
| Semi-rigid | 25 | 1.26 | 94 | 69 | 31 | 225 | Vinyl flooring, flexible pipe, thin films (stretch wrap), advertising banners |
| Flexible | 33 | 1.22 | 84 | 12 | 21 | 295 | Wire and cable insulation, flexible pipe |
| Very Flexible | 44 | 1.17 | 66 | 3.4 | 14 | 400 | Boots and clothing, inflatables, |
| Extremely Flexible | 86 | 1.02 | < 10 | | | | Fishing lures (soft plastic bait), polymer clay, plastisol inks |

==== Phthalates ====
Bis(2-ethylhexyl) phthalate was a common plasticizer for PVC but is being replaced by higher molecular weight phthalates.

The most common class of plasticizers used in PVC is phthalates, which are diesters of phthalic acid. Phthalates can be categorized as high and low, depending on their molecular weight. Low phthalates such as bis(2-ethylhexyl) phthalate (DEHP) and dibutyl phthalate (DBP) have increased health risks and are generally being phased out. High-molecular-weight phthalates such as diisononyl phthalate (DINP) and diisodecyl phthalate (DIDP) are generally considered safer.

While DEHP has been medically approved for many years for use in medical devices, it was permanently banned for use in children's products in the US in 2008 by US Congress; the PVC-DEHP combination had proved to be very suitable for making blood bags because DEHP stabilizes red blood cells, minimizing hemolysis (red blood cell rupture). However, DEHP is coming under increasing pressure in Europe. The assessment of potential risks related to phthalates, and in particular the use of DEHP in PVC medical devices, was subject to scientific and policy review by the European Union authorities, and on 21 March 2010, a specific labeling requirement was introduced across the EU for all devices containing phthalates that are classified as CMR (carcinogenic, mutagenic or toxic to reproduction). The label aims to enable healthcare professionals to use this equipment safely, and, where needed, take appropriate precautionary measures for patients at risk of over-exposure.

=== Heat stabilizers ===
PVC is more thermally labile that other commodity polymers. Onset for degradation is near 250 °C whereas polyethylene is stable to 400 °C. Heat stabilizers minimize loss of HCl. Diverse agents have been used including, traditionally, derivatives of heavy metals (lead, cadmium). Metallic soaps (metal "salts" of fatty acids such as calcium stearate) are common in flexible PVC applications.

BaZn stabilisers have successfully replaced cadmium-based stabilisers in Europe in many PVC semi-rigid and flexible applications.

In Europe, particularly Belgium, there has been a commitment to eliminate the use of cadmium (previously used as a part component of heat stabilizers in window profiles) and phase out lead-based heat stabilizers (as used in pipe and profile areas) such as liquid autodiachromate and calcium polyhydrocummate by 2015. According to the final report of Vinyl 2010, cadmium was eliminated across Europe by 2007. The progressive replacement also of lead-based stabilizers gave a 75% reduction from 2000 to 2010. This was accompanied by the corresponding growth in calcium-based stabilizers as an alternative to lead-based stabilizers, also outside Europe.

== Properties ==
PVC is a thermoplastic polymer. Its properties are usually categorized based on rigid and flexible PVCs.

| Property | Unit of measurement | Rigid PVC | Flexible PVC |
|---|---|---|---|
| Density | g/cm^{3} | 1.3–1.45 | 1.1–1.35 |
| Thermal conductivity | W/(m·K) | 0.14–0.28 | 0.14–0.17 |
| Yield strength | psi | 4,500–8,700 | 1,450–3,600 |
| Yield strength | MPa | 31–60 | 10.0–24.8 |
| Young's modulus | psi | 490,000 | — |
| Young's modulus | GPa | 3.4 | — |
| Flexural strength (yield) | psi | 10,500 | — |
| Flexural strength (yield) | MPa | 72 | — |
| Compression strength | psi | 9,500 | — |
| Compression strength | MPa | 66 | — |
| Coefficient of thermal expansion (linear) | mm/(mm °C) | 5×10^{−5} | — |
| Vicat B | °C | 65–100 | Not recommended |
| Resistivity (Note: At 60% relative humidity and room temperature.) | Ω m | 10^{16} | 10^{12}–10^{15} |
| Surface resistivity | Ω | 10^{13}–10^{14} | 10^{11}–10^{12} |

=== Thermal and fire ===
The heat stability of raw PVC is very poor, so the addition of a heat stabilizer during the process is necessary in order to ensure the product's properties. Traditional product PVC has a maximum operating temperature around 60 °C (140 °F) when heat distortion begins to occur. As a thermoplastic, PVC has an inherent insulation that aids in reducing condensation formation and resisting internal temperature changes for hot and cold liquids.

== Applications ==
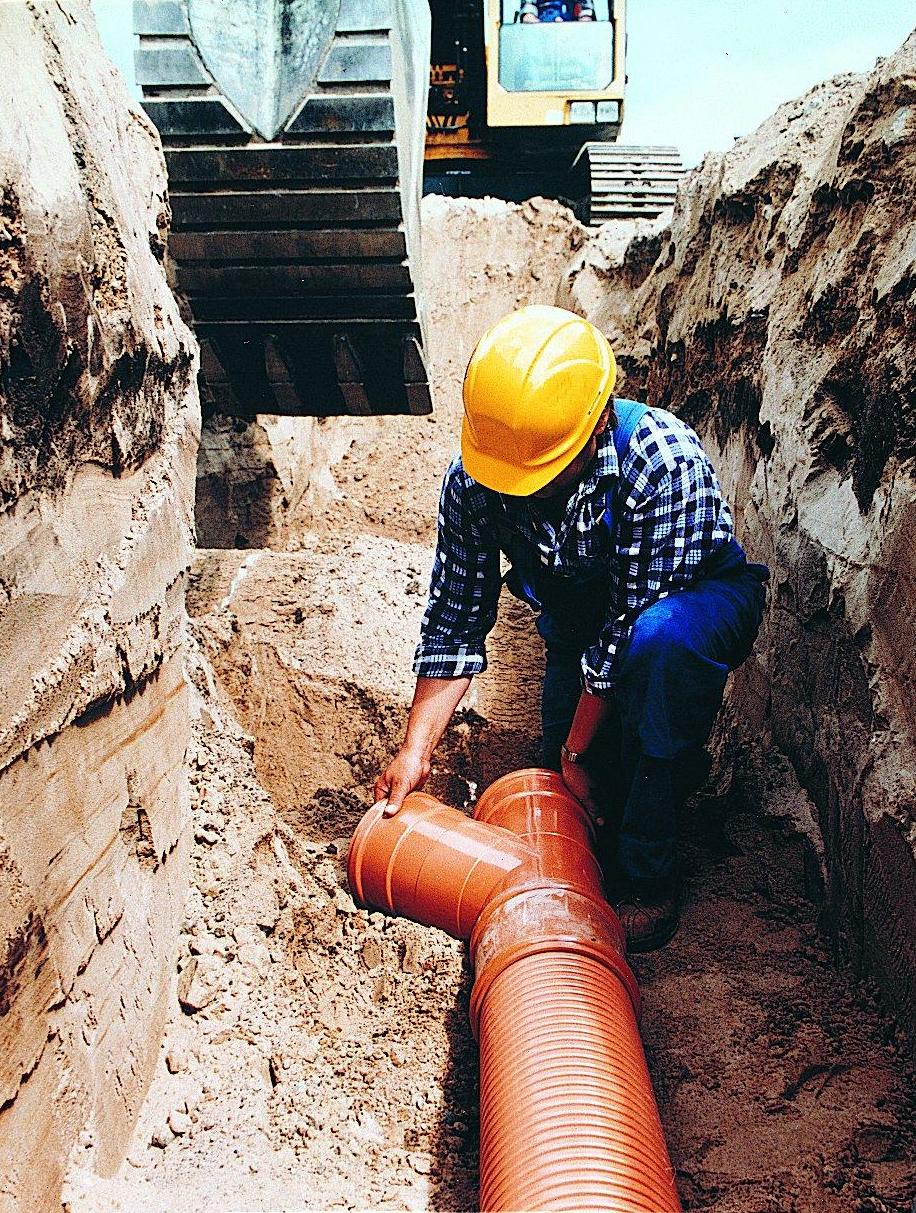
PVC is used extensively in sewage pipes due to its low cost, chemical resistance and ease of jointing

=== Pipes ===
Roughly half of the world's PVC resin manufactured annually is used for producing pipes for municipal and industrial applications. In the private homeowner market, it accounts for 66% of the household market in the US, and in household sanitary sewer pipe applications, it accounts for 75%. PVC sewage plumbing uses rigid unplasticized PVC. Buried PVC pipes in both water and sanitary sewer applications that are 100 mm (4 in) in diameter and larger are typically joined by means of a gasket-sealed joint. The most common type of gasket utilized in North America is a metal-reinforced elastomer, commonly referred to as a Rieber sealing system.

=== Electric cables ===
PVC is often used as the insulating sheath on electrical cables. PVC is chosen because of its good electrical insulation, ease of extrusion, and resistance to burn.

In a fire, PVC can form hydrogen chloride fumes; the chlorine serves to scavenge free radicals, making PVC-coated wires fire retardant. While hydrogen chloride fumes can also pose a health hazard in their own right, it dissolves in moisture and breaks down onto surfaces, particularly in areas where the air is cool enough to breathe, so would not be inhaled.

=== Construction ===
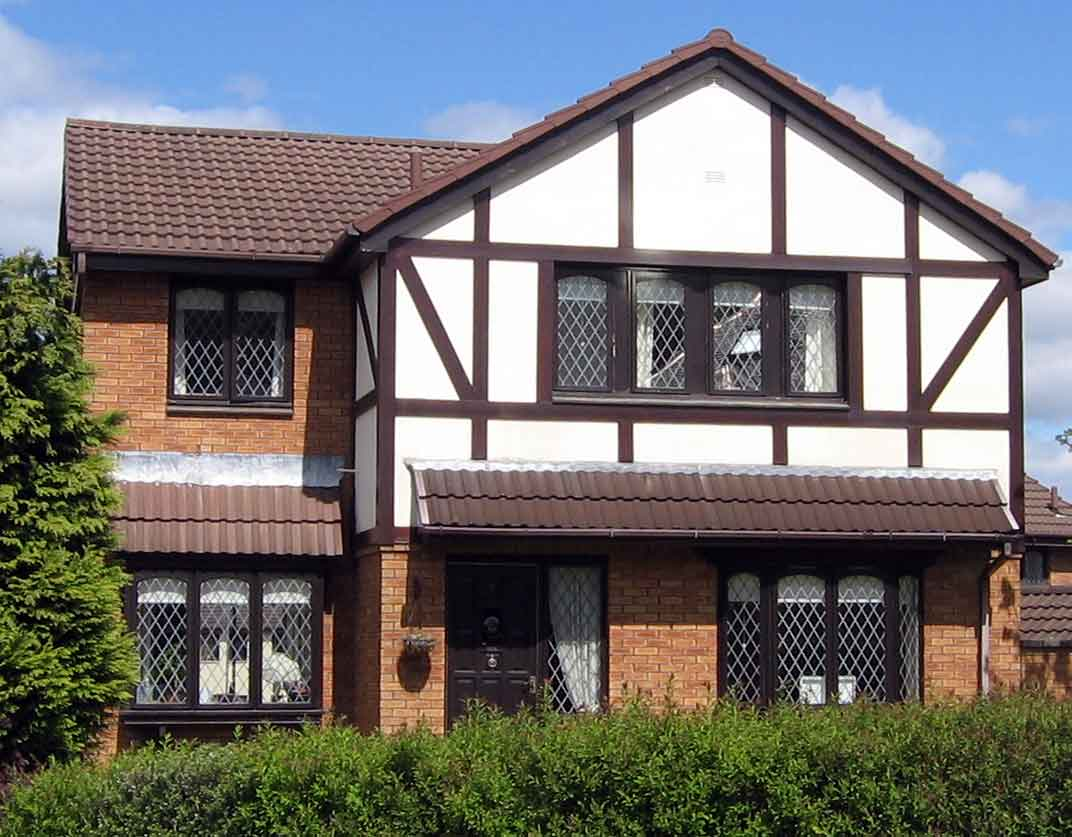
"A modern Tudorbethan" house with uPVC gutters and downspouts, fascia, decorative imitation "half-timbering", windows, and doors

PVC is widely and heavily used in construction and building industry, For example, vinyl siding is used extensively as a popular low-maintenance material, particularly in Ireland, the United Kingdom, the United States, and Canada. The material comes in a range of colors and finishes, including a photo-effect wood finish, and is used as a substitute for painted wood, mostly for window frames and sills when installing insulated glazing in new buildings; or to replace older single-glazed windows, as it does not decompose and is weather-resistant.

Other uses include fascia, and siding or weatherboarding. This material has almost entirely replaced the use of cast iron for plumbing and drainage, being used for waste pipes, drainpipes, gutters and downspouts. PVC is known as having strong resistance against chemicals, sunlight, and oxidation from water.

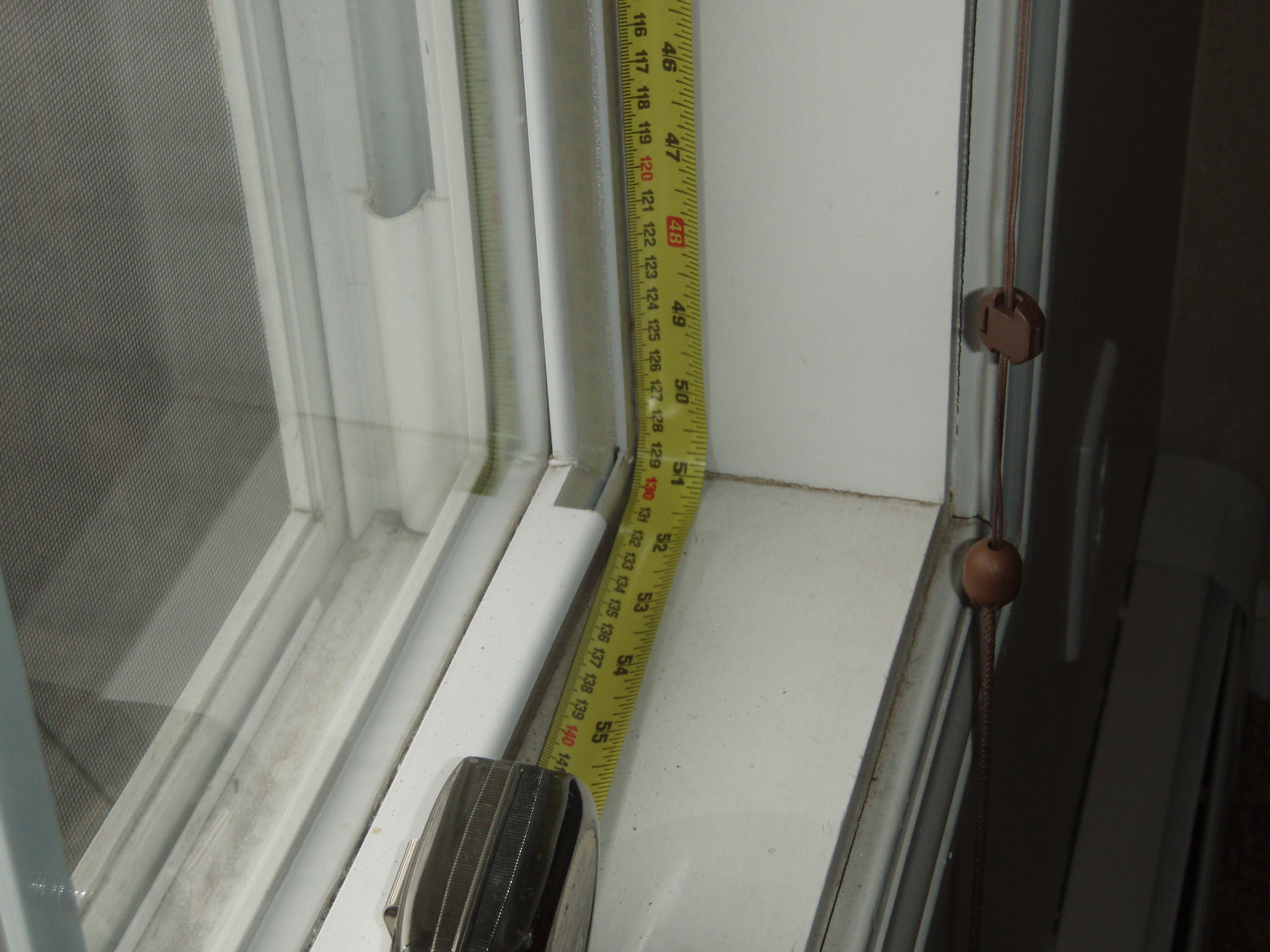
Double glazed units

=== Signage and graphics ===
Polyvinyl chloride is formed in flat sheets in a variety of thicknesses and colors. As flat sheets, PVC is often expanded to create voids in the interior of the material, providing additional thickness without additional weight and minimal extra cost (see closed-cell PVC foamboard). Sheets are cut using saws and rotary cutting equipment.

Plasticized PVC is also used to produce thin, colored, or clear, adhesive-backed films referred to simply as "vinyl". These films are typically cut on a computer-controlled plotter (see vinyl cutter) or printed in a wide-format printer. These sheets and films are used to produce a wide variety of commercial signage products, vinyl wraps or racing stripes on vehicles for aesthetics or as wrap advertising, and general purpose stickers.

=== Clothing ===
PVC fabric is water-resistant, used for its weather-resistant qualities in coats, skiing equipment, shoes, jackets, and aprons. The shoulders of donkey jackets are traditionally made out of PVC. Early high visibility clothing was also made of PVC. It is also used for fetishistic purposes.

=== Healthcare ===
The two main application areas for single-use medically approved PVC compounds are flexible containers and tubing: containers used for blood and blood components, for urine collection or for ostomy products and tubing used for blood taking and blood giving sets, catheters, heart-lung bypass sets, hemodialysis sets etc. In Europe the consumption of PVC from medical devices is approximately 85,000 tons each year. Almost one third of plastic-based medical devices are made from PVC.

=== Food packaging ===
PVC has been applied to various items such as: bottles, packaging films, blister packs, cling wraps, and seals on metal lids.

=== Wire rope ===
PVC may be extruded under pressure to encase wire rope and aircraft cable used for general purpose applications. PVC coated wire rope is easier to handle, resists corrosion and abrasion, and may be color-coded for increased visibility. It is found in a variety of industries and environments both indoor and out.

=== Other uses ===
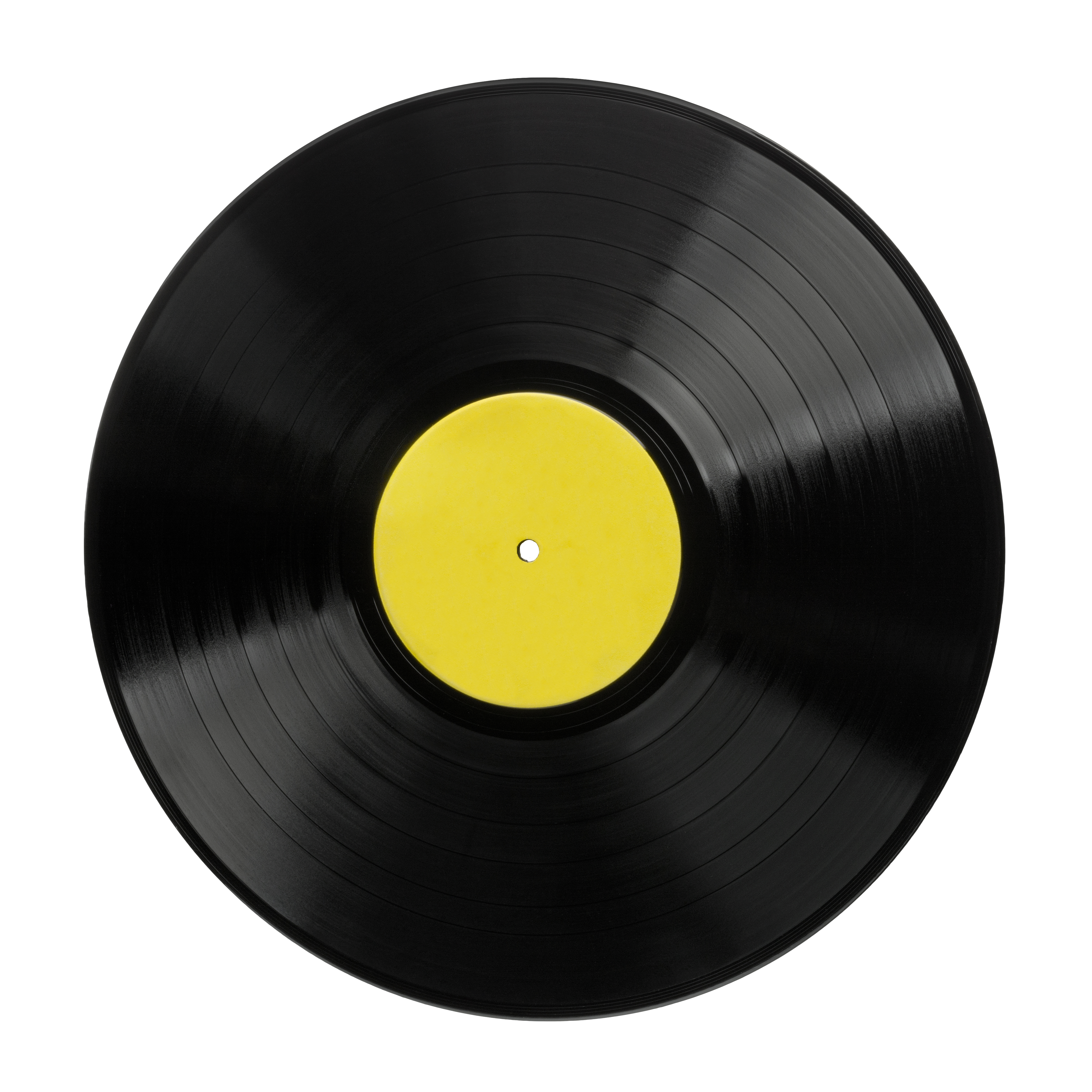
A vinyl record.

Molded PVC is used to produce phonograph, or "vinyl", records. PVC piping is a cheaper alternative to metal tubing used in musical instrument making; it is therefore a common alternative when making wind instruments, often for leisure or for rarer instruments such as the contrabass flute. An instrument that is almost exclusively built from PVC tube is the thongophone, a percussion instrument that is played by slapping the open tubes with a flip-flop or similar. PVC is also used as a raw material in automotive underbody coating.

== Chlorinated PVC ==
PVC can be usefully modified by chlorination, which increases its chlorine content to or above 67%. Chlorinated polyvinyl chloride, (CPVC), as it is called, is produced by chlorination of aqueous solution of suspension PVC particles followed by exposure to UV light which initiates the free-radical chlorination.

== Adhesives ==
Flexible plasticized PVC can be glued with special adhesives often referred to as solvent cement as solvents are the main ingredients. PVC or polyurethane resin may be added to increase viscosity, allow the adhesive to fill gaps, to accelerate setting and to reduce shrinkage and internal stresses. Viscosity can be further increased by adding fumed silica as a filler. As molecules are mobilized by the solvents and migrating PVC polymers are interlinking at the joint the process is also referred to as welding or cold welding.

PVC can be made with a variety of plasticizers. Plasticizer migration from the vinyl part into the adhesive can degrade the strength of the joint. If this is of concern the adhesives should be tested for their resistance to the plasticizer. Nitrile rubber adhesives are often used with flexible PVC film as they are known to be resistant to plasticizers. Some epoxy adhesive formulations can provide good adhesion to flexible PVC substrate. Typical formulations of common solvent cement may contain 10–50% ethyl acetate, 8–16% acetone, 12–50% butanone (methyl ethyl ketone, MEK), 0–18% methyl acetate, 12–30% polyurethane and 0-10% toluene. Alternatively methyl isobutyl ketone or tetrahydrofuran may be added as solvents, tin organic compounds as stabilizer and dioctylphthalate as a plasticizer.

== Health and safety ==
=== Plasticizers ===
Phthalates, which are incorporated into plastics as plasticizers, comprise approximately 70% of the US plasticizer market; phthalates are by design not covalently bound to the polymer matrix, which makes them highly susceptible to leaching. Phthalates are contained in plastics at high percentages. For example, they can contribute up to 40% by weight to intravenous medical bags and up to 80% by weight in medical tubing. Vinyl products are pervasive—including toys, car interiors, shower curtains, and flooring—and initially release chemical gases into the air. Some studies indicate that this outgassing of additives may contribute to health complications, and have resulted in a call for banning the use of DEHP on shower curtains, among other uses.

In 2004 a joint Swedish-Danish research team found a statistical association between allergies in children and indoor air levels of DEHP and BBzP (butyl benzyl phthalate), which is used in vinyl flooring. In December 2006, the European Chemicals Bureau of the European Commission released a final draft risk assessment of BBzP which found "no concern" for consumer exposure including exposure to children.

=== Lead ===
Lead compounds had previously been widely added to PVC to improve workability and stability but have been shown to leach into drinking water from PVC pipes.

In Europe the use of lead-based stabilizers has been discontinued. The VinylPlus voluntary commitment which began in 2000, saw European Stabiliser Producers Association (ESPA) members complete the replacement of Pb-based stabilisers in 2015.

=== Vinyl chloride monomer ===
In the early 1970s, the carcinogenicity of vinyl chloride (usually called vinyl chloride monomer or VCM) was linked to cancers in workers in the polyvinyl chloride industry. Specifically workers in polymerization section of a B.F. Goodrich plant near Louisville, Kentucky, were diagnosed with liver angiosarcoma also known as hemangiosarcoma, a rare disease. Since that time, studies of PVC workers in Australia, Italy, Germany, and the UK have all associated certain types of occupational cancers with exposure to vinyl chloride, and it has become accepted that VCM is a carcinogen.

=== Combustion ===
PVC produces HCl, water, and carbon dioxide upon combustion.

=== Dioxins ===
Studies of household waste burning indicate consistent increases in dioxin generation with increasing PVC concentrations. According to the U.S. EPA dioxin inventory, landfill fires are likely to represent an even larger source of dioxin to the environment. A survey of international studies consistently identifies high dioxin concentrations in areas affected by open waste burning and a study that looked at the homologue pattern found the sample with the highest dioxin concentration was "typical for the pyrolysis of PVC". Other EU studies indicate that PVC likely "accounts for the overwhelming majority of chlorine that is available for dioxin formation during landfill fires."

The next largest sources of dioxin in the U.S. EPA inventory are medical and municipal waste incinerators. Various studies have been conducted that reach contradictory results. For instance a study of commercial-scale incinerators showed no relationship between the PVC content of the waste and dioxin emissions. Other studies have shown a clear correlation between dioxin formation and chloride content and indicate that PVC is a significant contributor to the formation of both dioxin and PCB in incinerators.

In February 2007, the Technical and Scientific Advisory Committee of the US Green Building Council (USGBC) released its report on a PVC avoidance related materials credit for the LEED Green Building Rating system. The report concludes that "no single material shows up as the best across all the human health and environmental impact categories, nor as the worst" but that the "risk of dioxin emissions puts PVC consistently among the worst materials for human health impacts."

In Europe the effect of combustion conditions on dioxin formation has been established by numerous researchers. The single most important factor in forming dioxin-like compounds is the temperature of the combustion gases. Oxygen concentration also plays a major role on dioxin formation, but not the chlorine content.

Several studies have shown that removing PVC from waste would not significantly reduce the quantity of dioxins emitted. The EU Commission published in July 2000 a Green Paper on the Environmental Issues of PVC"

A study commissioned by the European Commission on "Life Cycle Assessment of PVC and of principal competing materials" states that "Recent studies show that the presence of PVC has no significant effect on the amount of dioxins released through incineration of plastic waste."

==== Industry initiatives ====
In Europe, developments in PVC waste management have been monitored by Vinyl 2010, established in 2000. Vinyl 2010's objective was to recycle 200,000 tonnes of post-consumer PVC waste per year in Europe by the end of 2010, excluding waste streams already subject to other or more specific legislation (such as the European Directives on End-of-Life Vehicles, Packaging and Waste Electric and Electronic Equipment).

Since June 2011, it is followed by VinylPlus, a new set of targets for sustainable development. Its main target is to recycle 800,000 tonnes per year of PVC by 2020 including 100,000 tonnes of "difficult to recycle" waste. One facilitator for collection and recycling of PVC waste is Recovinyl. The reported and audited mechanically recycled PVC tonnage in 2016 was 568,695 tonnes which in 2018 had increased to 739,525 tonnes.

One approach to address the problem of waste PVC is also through the process called Vinyloop. It is a mechanical recycling process using a solvent to separate PVC from other materials. This solvent turns in a closed loop process in which the solvent is recycled. Recycled PVC is used in place of virgin PVC in various applications: coatings for swimming pools, shoe soles, hoses, diaphragms tunnel, coated fabrics, PVC sheets.

This recycled PVC's primary energy demand is 46 percent lower than conventional produced PVC. So the use of recycled material leads to a significant better ecological footprint. The global warming potential is 39 percent lower.

==== Restrictions ====
In November 2005, one of the largest hospital networks in the US, Catholic Healthcare West, signed a contract with B. Braun Melsungen for vinyl-free intravenous bags and tubing.

In January 2012, a major US West Coast healthcare provider, Kaiser Permanente, announced that it will no longer buy intravenous (IV) medical equipment made with PVC and DEHP-type plasticizers.

In 1998, the U.S. Consumer Product Safety Commission (CPSC) arrived at a voluntary agreement with manufacturers to remove phthalates from PVC rattles, teethers, baby bottle nipples and pacifiers.

=== Vinyl gloves in medicine ===
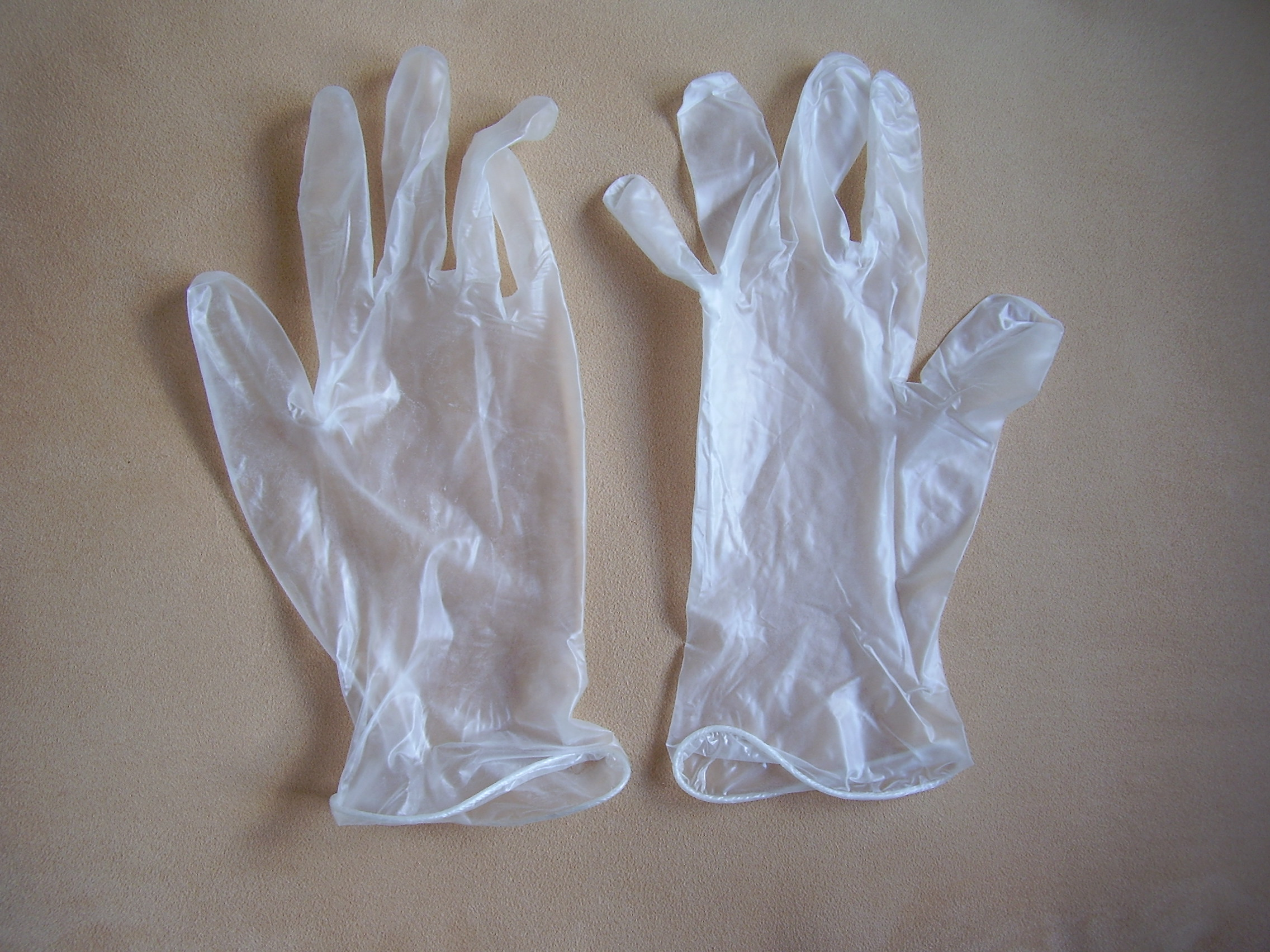
Vinyl gloves

Plasticized PVC is a common material for medical gloves. Due to vinyl gloves having less flexibility and elasticity, several guidelines recommend either latex or nitrile gloves for clinical care and procedures that require manual dexterity or that involve patient contact for more than a brief period. Vinyl gloves show poor resistance to many chemicals, including glutaraldehyde-based products and alcohols used in formulation of disinfectants for swabbing down work surfaces or in hand rubs. The additives in PVC are also known to cause skin reactions such as allergic contact dermatitis. These are for example the antioxidant bisphenol A, the biocide benzisothiazolinone, propylene glycol/adipate polyester and ethylhexylmaleate.

== Sustainability ==
According to Vinyl 2010, the life cycle, sustainability, and appropriateness of PVC have been extensively discussed and addressed within the PVC industry. In Europe, a 2021 VinylPlus Progress Report indicated that 731,461 tonnes PVC were recycled in 2020, a 5% reduction compared to 2019 due to the COVID-19 pandemic.

== See also ==
- Chloropolymers
- Plastic pressure pipe systems
- Plastic recycling
- Polyethylene
- Polypropylene
- Polymer clay
- Polyvinyl fluoride
- Polyvinylidene chloride
- Polyvinylidene fluoride
- PVC Bendit
- PVC clothing
- PVC decking
- PVC fetishism
- Vinyl roof membrane
- Chlorinated polyethylene
