= Chloropolymer =

Chloropolymers are macromolecules synthesized from alkenes in which one or more hydrogens of the polymer were replaced by chlorine. A common example of a chloropolymer is polyvinyl chloride (PVC) and poly(dichlorophosphazene) which has a polymer formula of (PNCl_{2})_{n}, the precursor of which is hexachlorophosphazene, which itself has been called chloropolymer.
