= P4-t-Bu =

P₄-t-Bu

Identifiers
CAS Number	111324-04-0
3D model (JSmol)	Interactive image
ChemSpider	3543881
ECHA InfoCard	100.157.699
EC Number	629-524-3
PubChem CID	4339838
UNII	114S812CQB
CompTox Dashboard (EPA)	DTXSID101114057
- InChI: InChI=1S/C22H63N13P4/c1-22(2,3)23-36(24-37(27(4)5,28(6)7)29(8)9,25-38(30(10)11,31(12)13)32(14)15)26-39(33(16)17,34(18)19)35(20)21/h1-21H3 Key: NSRBCQCXZAYQHF-UHFFFAOYSA-N
- SMILES: CC(C)(C)N=P(N=P(N(C)C)(N(C)C)N(C)C)(N=P(N(C)C)(N(C)C)N(C)C)N=P(N(C)C)(N(C)C)N(C)C

Properties
Chemical formula	(CH_{3})_{3}C−N=P(−N=P(−N(CH_{3})_{2})_{3})_{3}
Molar mass	633.732 g·mol^{−1}
- Except where otherwise noted, data are given for materials in their standard state (at 25 °C [77 °F], 100 kPa). Infobox references

P_{4}-t-Bu is a readily accessible chemical from the group of neutral, peralkylated sterically hindered polyaminophosphazenes, which are extremely strong bases but very weak nucleophiles, with the formula (CH_{3})_{3}C−N=P(−N=P(−N(CH_{3})_{2})_{3})_{3}. "t-Bu" stands for tert-butyl (CH_{3})_{3}C–. "P_{4}" stands for the fact that this molecule has 4 phosphorus atoms. P_{4}-t-Bu can also be regarded as tetrameric triaminoiminophosphorane of the basic structure H−N=P(−NH_{2})_{3}. The homologous series of P_{1} to P_{7} polyaminophosphazenes of the general formula $\ce{[(R^1_2N)_3P=N-]_\mathit{x}-(R^1_2N)_{3\!-\mathit{x}}P=NR2}$ with preferably methyl groups as R^{1}, a methyl group or tert-butyl group as and even-numbered x between 0 and 6 (P_{4}-t-Bu: R^{1} = Me, R^{2} = t-Bu and x = 3) has been developed by Reinhard Schwesinger; the resulting phosphazene bases are therefore also referred to as Schwesinger superbases.

== Preparation ==
The convergent synthesis of P_{4}-t-Bu is derived from phosphorus pentachloride (1) and leads in branch [A] to the well-characterized aminotris via the non-isolated chlorine (dimethylamino)phosphonium chloride (2) via [(Dimethylamino)phosphonium tetrafluoroborate (3) and further via [A2] to the liquid iminotris (dimethylamino) phosphorane(4)

$$\begin{matrix}{}\\ \underbrace\ce{PCl5}_{(1)}\ \ce{->[\ce{Me2NH}]} \underbrace{\left[ \ce{(Me2N)3\overset{\oplus}P-Cl . \overset{\ominus}Cl} \right]}_{(2)}\ \ce{->[1.\ \ce{NH3}][2.\ \ce{NaBF4}]}\ \underbrace\ce{(Me2N)3\overset{\oplus}P-NH2 . \overset{\ominus}BF4}_{(3)} \\{}\end{matrix}$$ / [A1]; $\underbrace\ce{(Me2N)3\overset{\oplus}P-NH2 . \overset{\ominus}BF4}_{(3)}\ \ce{->[\ce{KOMe}]}\ \underbrace\ce{(Me2N)3P=NH}_{(4)}$ / [A2]	[A]

and in branch [B] with phosphorus pentachloride and tert-butylammonium chloride to tert-butylphosphorimide trichloride (5)

$\underbrace\ce{PCl5}_{(1)}\ \ce{->[t\text{-}\ce{Bu-\overset{\oplus}{NH3}.\overset{\ominus}{Cl}}]}\ \underbrace{t\text{-}\ce{Bu-N=PCl3}}_{(5)}$	[B]

The reaction [C] of excess (4) with (5) yields the hydrochloride of the target product P_{4}-t-Bu (6) in 93% yield

$$\scriptstyle\begin{matrix}{}\\ \underbrace\ce{7(Me2N)3P=NH}_{(4)}\ +\ \underbrace{t\text{-}\ce{Bu-N=PCl3}}_{(5)}\ \ce{->}\ \underbrace{\ce{[(Me2N)3P=N]3P=N\overset{\oplus}H-}t\text{-}\ce{Bu . \overset{\ominus}{Cl}}}_{(6)}\ \ce{->[\ce{NaBF4}]}\ \underbrace{\ce{[(Me2N)3P=N]3P=N\overset{\oplus}H-}t\text{-}\ce{Bu . \overset{\ominus}BF4}}_{(7)}\ \ce{->[\ce{KOMe / NaNH2}]}\ \underbrace{\ce{[(Me2N)3P=N]3P=N\overset{\oplus}H-}t\text{-}\ce{Bu}}_{(8)} \\{}\end{matrix}$$	[C]

which is also converted into the tetrafluoroborate salt (7) from which the free base (8) can be obtained almost quantitatively with potassium methoxide/sodium amide or with potassium amide in liquid ammonia. The transfer of the hygroscopic and readily water-soluble hydrochlorides and the liquid free bases into the tetrafluoroborates, which are difficult to solubilize in water, facilitate the handling of the substances considerably.

[D]

The relatively uncomplicated convergent synthesis with easily accessible reactants and very good yields of the intermediates make P_{4}-t-Bu an phosphazene superbase.

== Properties ==
P_{4}-t-Bu is one of the strongest neutral nitrogenous bases with an extrapolated pK_{a} value of 42.1 in acetonitrile and is compared to the strong base DBU with a pKa value of 24.3 by 18 orders of magnitude more basic. The compound is very soluble in non-polar solvents, such as hexane, toluene or tetrahydrofuran, and is usually commercially available as a 0.8 to 1 molar solution in hexane. Already in weakly acidic media protonation produces the extremely delocalized and soft P_{4}-t-Bu-H cation and causes besides a very strong solubilization effect also an extreme acceleration of addition reactions even at temperatures below -78 °C.

P_{4}-t-Bu owes its high basicity with low nucleophilicity to its very high steric hindrance and the involvement of many donor groups in conjugation with the spatially demanding structure of the cation formed by protonation.

P_{4}-t-Bu is an extremely hygroscopic solid which is thermally stable up to 120 °C and chemically stable to (dry) oxygen and bases. Traces of water and protic impurities can be eliminated by addition of bromoethane. The base is both very hydrophilic and very lipophilic and can be recovered easily and almost completely from reaction mixtures by the formation of the sparingly soluble tetrafluoroborate salt.

Because of its extremely weak Lewis basicity, the cation of P_{4}-t-Bu suppresses typical side reactions of metal organyls (such as aldol condensations) as can be caused by lithium amides such as lithium diisopropylamide (LDA).

== Applications ==
The neutral superbase P_{4}-t-Bu is superior to ionic bases if those are sensitive to oxidation or side reactions (such as acylation) when they cause solubility problems or Lewis acid catalysed side reactions (such as aldol reactions, epoxy ring opening etc).

The dehydrohalogenation of n-alkyl bromides yields the alkene, such as the reaction 1-bromooctane with P_{4}-t-Bu which yields 1-octene almost quantitatively (96%) under mild conditions, compared to the potassium tert-butoxide/18-crown-6 system with only 75% yield.

Alkylations on weakly acidic methylene groups (e.g. in the case of carboxylic esters or nitriles) proceed with high yield and selectivity. For example, by the reaction of 8-phenylmenthylphenylacetate with iodoethane in the presence of P_{4}-t-Bu only the monoethyl derivative in the Z configuration is obtained in 95% yield.

Succinonitrile reacts with iodoethane in the presence of P_{4}-t-Bu in 98% yield to give the tetraethyl derivative without undergoing a Thorpe-Ziegler reaction to form a cyclic α-ketonitrile.

Trifluoromethylation of ketones (such as benzophenone) is also possible at room temperature in good yields up to 84% with the inert fluoroform (HFC-23) in the presence of P_{4}-t-Bu and tris(trimethylsilyl)amine.

Intramolecular cyclization of ortho-alkynylphenyl ethers leads in the presence of P_{4}-t-Bu under mild conditions without metal catalysts to substituted benzofurans.

Due to its extreme basicity it was suggested early on that P_{4}-t-Bu should be suited as an initiator for anionic polymerization. With the ethyl acetate/P_{4}-t-Bu initiator system, poly(methyl methacrylate) (PMMA) with narrow polydispersity and molar masses up to 40,000 g·mol^{−1} could be obtained in THF.

Anionic polymerization of Ethylene oxide with the initiator system n-Butyllithium/P_{4}-t-Bu yields well-defined Polyethylene oxides with low polydispersity.

Cyclic siloxanes (such as hexamethylcyclotrisiloxane or decamethylcyclopentasiloxane) can also be polymerized with catalytic amounts of P_{4}-t-Bu and water or silanols as initiators under good molecular weight control to thermally very stable polysiloxanes having decomposition temperatures of >450 °C. Because of its extreme basicity, P_{4}-t-Bu eagerly absorbs water and carbon dioxide, both of which inhibit anionic polymerization. Heating to temperatures >100 °C removes CO_{2} and water and restores the anionic polymerization. The extreme hygroscopy of the phosphazene base P_{4}-t-Bu as a substance and in solutions requires a great effort for storage and handling and prevents its broader use.
