= Poly(dichlorophosphazene) =

Names
- Other names Dichlorophosphazine polymer; Phosphonitrilechloride polymer

Identifiers
CAS Number	26085-02-9
Abbreviations	PDCP
ChemSpider	none
ECHA InfoCard	100.152.298

Properties
Chemical formula	(PNCl_{2})_{n}
Density	1.823 g/mL
- Except where otherwise noted, data are given for materials in their standard state (at 25 °C [77 °F], 100 kPa). Infobox references

Poly(dichlorophosphazene), also called dichlorophosphazine polymer or phosphonitrilechloride polymer, is a chemical compound with formula (PNCl_{2})_{n}. It is an inorganic (hence carbon-free) chloropolymer, whose backbone is a chain of alternating phosphorus and nitrogen atoms, connected by alternating single and double covalent bonds.

The compound can be prepared by polymerization of hexachlorophosphazene ((PNCl_{2})_{3}) by heating to ca. 250 °C. It is an "inorganic rubber" and the starting material for many other polymers with the -P=N- backbone (polyphosphazenes), which have important commercial uses.

== History ==
Poly(dichlorophosphazene) was discovered by H. N. Stokes in the 19th century, and at that time its superior properties over natural rubber were already noted. In 1965, Harry R. Allcock at Pennsylvania State University synthesized a soluble form of the polymer, which opened the doors to the development of many derivatives.

== Uses ==
Poly(dichlorophosphazene) is not water-resistant. However, it is soluble in organic solvents such as THF and benzene, wherein it can be derivatized by replacement of the chlorine atoms with -OR or -NR_{2} groups (R = alkyl, aryl) to yield many other polyphosphazenes. Some of these organically modified polymers are hydrolytically stable and exhibit some attractive properties such as low glass transition temperatures.
