= Enthalpy of sublimation =

Heat required to change one mole of substance from solid to gas

In thermodynamics, the enthalpy of sublimation, or heat of sublimation, is the heat required to sublimate (change from solid to gas) one mole of a substance at a given combination of temperature and pressure, usually standard temperature and pressure (STP). It is equal to the cohesive energy of the solid. For elemental metals, it is also equal to the standard enthalpy of formation of the gaseous metal atoms. The heat of sublimation is usually expressed in kJ/mol, although the less customary kJ/kg is also encountered.

== Sublimation enthalpies ==
symbol	substances	Sublimation enthalpy (kJ/mol)
Li	lithium	159
Na	sodium	107
K	potassium	89
Rb	rubidium	81
Cs	caesium	76
Mg	magnesium	148
Ca	calcium	178
Sr	strontium	164
Ba	barium	180
Fe	iron	416
Ni	nickel	430
Cu	copper	338
Zn	zinc	131
Ag	silver	285
W	tungsten	849
Au	gold	366
C	graphite	717
C	diamond	715
Si	silicon	456
Sn	tin	302
Pb	lead	195
Fm	fermium	141
I_{2}	iodine	62.4
C_{10}H_{8}	naphthalene	72.9
CO_{2}	carbon dioxide	25
H_{2}O	water	51.1

== See also ==
- Heat
- Sublimation (chemistry)
- Phase transition
- Clausius–Clapeyron relation
