= Phosphazene =

Organophosphorus compound with pentavalent phosphorus having P=N bonds

Phosphazenes refer to various classes of organophosphorus compounds featuring phosphorus(V) with a double bond between P and N. One class of phosphazenes have the formula R−N=P(−NR_{2})_{3}. These phosphazenes are also known as iminophosphoranes and phosphine imides. They are superbases.

== BEMP and t-Bu-P_{4} ==
Well known phosphazene bases are BEMP (2-tert-Butylimino-2-diEthylamino-1,3-diMethylperhydro-1,3,2-diazaPhosphorine) with an acetonitrile pK_{a} of the conjugate acid of 27.6 and the phosphorimidic triamide t-Bu-P_{4} (pK_{BH^{+}} = 42.7) also known as Schwesinger base. BEMP and P4-t-Bu|t-Bu-P_{4} have attracted attention because they are low-nucleophilic, which precludes their participating in competing reactions. Being non-ionic ("charge-neutral"), they are soluble in nonpolar solvents. Protonation takes place at a doubly bonded nitrogen atom. The pK_{a}'s of tert-Bu−(H)N=P(−N=P(−NR_{2})_{3})_{3}]^{+}, where R = Me and pyrrolidinyl, are 42.7 and 44, respectively. These are the highest pK_{a} recorded for the conjugate acid of charge-neutral molecular base.

t-Bu-P_{4}

BEMP

In one implementation, t-Bu-P_{4} catalyzes the conversion of pivaldehyde to the alcohol: Phosphazene bases have been used as basic titrants in non-aqueous acid–base titrations.

== Other classes of phosphazenes ==
Also called phosphazenes are represented with the formula (−N=P(−X)_{2}−)_{n}, where X = halogen, alkoxy group, amide and other organyl groups. One example is hexachlorocyclotriphosphazene (−N=P(−Cl)_{2}−)_{3}. Bis(triphenylphosphine)iminium chloride [Ph_{3}P=N=PPh_{3}]^{+}Cl^{−}is also referred to as a phosphazene, where Ph = phenyl group. The present article focuses on those phosphazenes with the formula R−N=P(−NR_{2})_{3}.

== See also ==
- Verkade bases feature P(III) with three amido substituents and a transannular amine
- Cyclodiphosphazane
- Hexachlorophosphazene
- Polyphosphazene
