= Polyphosphazene =

Class of inorganic polymers

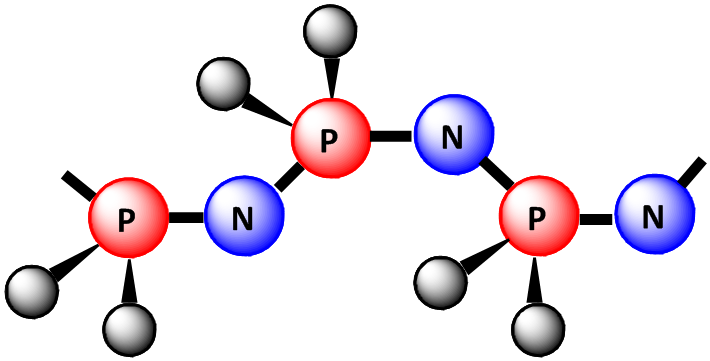
General structure of polyphosphazenes. Gray spheres represent any organic or inorganic group.

Polyphosphazenes include a wide range of hybrid inorganic-organic polymers with a number of different skeletal architectures with the backbone P-N-P-N-P-N-. In nearly all of these materials two organic side groups are attached to each phosphorus center. Linear polymers have the formula (N=PR^{1}R^{2})_{n}, where R^{1} and R^{2} are organic (see graphic). Other architectures are cyclolinear and cyclomatrix polymers in which small phosphazene rings are connected together by organic chain units. Other architectures are available, such as block copolymer, star, dendritic, or comb-type structures. More than 700 different polyphosphazenes are known, with different side groups (R) and different molecular architectures. Many of these polymers were first synthesized and studied in the research group of Harry R. Allcock.

== Synthesis ==
The method of synthesis depends on the type of polyphosphazene. The most widely used method for linear polymers is based on a two-step process. In the first step, hexachlorocyclotriphosphazene (NPCl_{2})_{3} is heated in a sealed system at 250 °C to convert it to a long chain linear polymer with typically 15,000 or more repeating units. In the second step the chlorine atoms linked to phosphorus in the polymer are replaced by organic groups through reactions with alkoxides, aryloxides, amines or organometallic reagents. Because many different reagents can participate in this macromolecular substitution reaction, and because two or more reagents may be used, a large number of different polymers can be produced.. Variations to this process are possible using poly(dichlorophosphazene) made by condensation reactions.

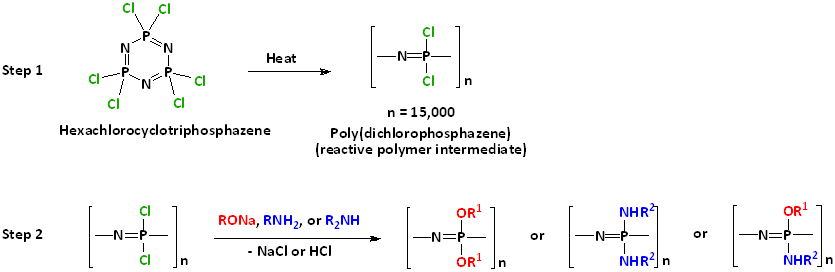

Another synthetic process uses Cl_{3}PNSiMe_{3} as a precursor:

n Cl_{3}PNSiMe_{3} → [Cl_{2}PN]_{n} + ClSiMe_{3}

Because the process is a living cationic polymerization, block copolymers or comb, star, or dendritic architectures are possible. Other synthetic methods include the condensation reactions of organic-substituted phosphoranimines.

Cyclomatrix type polymers made by linking small molecule phosphazene rings together employ difunctional organic reagents to replace the chlorine atoms in (NPCl_{2})_{3}, or the introduction of allyl or vinyl substituents, which are then polymerized by free-radical methods. Such polymers may be useful as coatings or thermosetting resins, often prized for their thermal stability.

== Properties and uses ==
The linear high polymers have the geometry shown in the picture. More than 700 different macromolecules that correspond to e group]]s or combinations of different side groups. In these polymers the properties are defined by the high flexibility of the backbone. Other potentially attractive properties include radiation resistance, high refractive index, ultraviolet and visible transparency, and its fire resistance. The side groups exert an equal or even greater influence on the properties since they impart properties such as hydrophobicity, hydrophilicity, color, useful biological properties such as bioerodibility, or ion transport properties to the polymers. Representative examples of these polymers are shown below.

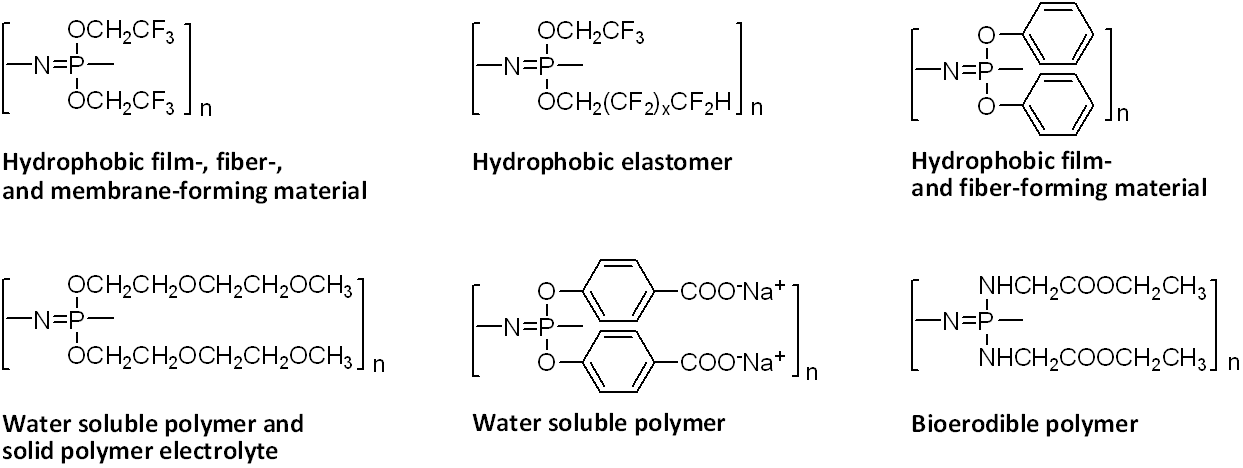

=== Thermoplastics ===
The first stable thermoplastic poly(organophosphazenes), isolated in the mid 1960s by Allcock, Kugel, and Valan, were macromolecules with trifluoroethoxy, phenoxy, methoxy, ethoxy, or various amino side groups. Of these early species, poly[bis(trifluoroethoxyphosphazene], [NP(OCH_{2}CF_{3})_{2}]_{n}, has proved to be the subject of intense research due to its crystallinity, high hydrophobicity, biological compatibility, fire resistance, general radiation stability, and ease of fabrication into films, microfibers and nanofibers. It has also been a substrate for various surface reactions to immobilize biological agents. The polymers with phenoxy or amino side groups have also been studied in detail.

=== Phosphazene elastomers ===
The first large-scale commercial uses for linear polyphosphazenes were in the field of high technology elastomers, with a typical example containing a combination of trifluoroethoxy and longer chain fluoroalkoxy groups. The mixture of two different side groups eliminates the crystallinity found in single-substituent polymers and allows the inherent flexibility and elasticity to become manifest. Glass transition temperatures as low as -60 °C are attainable, and properties such as oil-resistance and hydrophobicity are responsible for their utility in land vehicles and aerospace components. They have also been used in biostable biomedical devices.

Other side groups, such as non-fluorinated alkoxy or oligo-alkyl ether units, yield hydrophilic or hydrophobic elastomers with glass transitions over a broad range from -100 °C to 100 °C. Polymers with two different aryloxy side groups have also been developed as elastomers for fire-resistance as well as thermal and sound insulation applications.

=== Polymer electrolytes ===
Linear polyphosphazenes with oligo-ethyleneoxy side chains are gums that are good solvents for salts such as lithium triflate. These solutions function as electrolytes for lithium ion transport, and they were incorporated into fire-resistant rechargeable lithium-ion polymer battery. The same polymers are also of interest as the electrolyte in dye-sensitized solar cells. Other polyphosphazenes with sulfonated aryloxy side groups are proton conductors of interest for use in the membranes of proton exchange membrane fuel cells.

=== Hydrogels ===
Water-soluble poly(organophosphazenes) with oligo-ethyleneoxy side chains can be cross-linked by gamma-radiation. The cross-linked polymers absorb water to form hydrogels, which are responsive to temperature changes, expanding to a limit defined by the cross-link density below a critical solution temperature, but contracting above that temperature. This is the basis of controlled permeability membranes. Other polymers with both oligo-ethyleneoxy and carboxyphenoxy side groups expand in the presence of monovalent cations but contract in the presence of di- or tri-valent cations, which form ionic cross-links. Phosphazene hydrogels have been utilized for controlled drug release and other medical applications.

=== Bioerodible polyphosphazenes ===
The ease with which properties can be controlled and fine-tuned by the linkage of different side groups to polyphosphazene chains has prompted major efforts to address biomedical materials challenges using these polymers. Different polymers have been studied as macromolecular drug carriers, as membranes for the controlled delivery of drugs, as biostable elastomers, and especially as tailored bioerodible materials for the regeneration of living bone. An advantage for this last application is that poly(dichlorophosphazene) reacts with amino acid ethyl esters (such as ethyl glycinate or the corresponding ethyl esters of numerous other amino acids) through the amino terminus to form polyphosphazenes with amino acid ester side groups. These polymers hydrolyze slowly to a near-neutral, pH-buffered solution of the amino acid, ethanol, phosphate, and ammonium ion. The speed of hydrolysis depends on the amino acid ester, with half-lives that vary from weeks to months depending on the structure of the amino acid ester. Nanofibers and porous constructs of these polymers assist osteoblast replication and accelerate the repair of bone in animal model studies.

== Commercial aspects ==
No applications are commercialized for polyphosphazenes. The cyclic trimer hexachlorophosphazene ((NPCl_{2})_{3}) is commercially available. It is the starting point for most commercial developments. High performance elastomers known as PN-F or Eypel-F have been manufactured for seals, O-rings, and dental devices. An aryloxy-substituted polymer has also been developed as a fire resistant expanded foam for thermal and sound insulation. The patent literature contains many references to cyclomatrix polymers derived from cyclic trimeric phosphazenes incorporated into cross-linked resins for fire resistant circuit boards and related applications.

== Further information ==
"H. R. Allcock Research Group".
