= Pentafluoroselenium hypofluorite =

Names
- IUPAC name Pentafluoro(fluorooxy)-λ^{6}-selane

Identifiers
CAS Number	27218-12-8
3D model (JSmol)	Interactive image
ChemSpider	10329203
PubChem CID	23236092
- InChI: InChI=1S/F6OSe/c1-7-8(2,3,4,5)6 Key: DOWDYMDJZSUENF-UHFFFAOYSA-N; InChI=1/F6OSe/c1-7-8(2,3,4,5)6 Key: DOWDYMDJZSUENF-UHFFFAOYAU
- SMILES: F[Se](F)(F)(F)(F)OF

Properties
Chemical formula	SeOF_{6}
Molar mass	208.950
Appearance	white solid
Odor	strong and irritating
Melting point	−54°C
Boiling point	−30°C
Solubility in water	decomposes

Related compounds
Other cations	Pentafluorosulfur hypofluorite Pentafluorotellurium hypofluorite
- Except where otherwise noted, data are given for materials in their standard state (at 25 °C [77 °F], 100 kPa). Infobox references

Pentafluoroselenium hypofluorite is a selenium compound with the chemical formula SeOF_{6}. It was discovered at 1959.

== Preparation ==
Pentafluoroselenium hypofluorite can be produced from the reaction of selenium dioxide or selenium oxychloride with fluorine gas in the presence of silver difluoride catalyst. However, the reaction yield is low (14%), and it is hard to purify due to large amount of SeF_{6} byproduct.

Pentafluoroselenium hypofluorite can also formed from selenium oxyfluoride and fluorine gas in the presence of potassium fluoride.

SeOF_{2} + KF → K^{+}[SeOF_{3}]^{−} —^{F_{2}}→ K^{+}[SeOF_{5}]^{−} —^{F_{2}}→ KF + SeOF_{6}

The reaction of fluorine gas and Hg(OSeF_{5})_{2} produces SeOF_{6} in much higher yield and with less SeF_{6}.

== Reactions ==
Pentafluoroselenium hypofluorite is reactive, but not as reactive as pentafluorosulfur hypofluorite. It reacts with water to release oxygen gas. It reacts with potassium hydroxide too, forming potassium selenate, potassium fluoride, water and oxygen gas.：

2 SeOF_{6} + 16 KOH → 2 K_{2}SeO_{4} + 12 KF + 8 H_{2}O + O_{2}↑

SeOF_{6} can also oxidize potassium iodide into iodine. It explodes upon reacting with ethylene, and the reaction with perfluorocyclopentene produces F_{5}SeOC_{5}F_{9}. SeOF_{6} reacts with sulfur tetrafluoride to produce thionyl fluoride, thionyl tetrafluoride, sulfuryl fluoride, selenium hexafluoride and F_{5}SOSeF_{5}. SeOF_{6} reacts very slowly with carbon monoxide, and produces F_{5}SeOCFO at 65°C. SeOF_{6} reacts with bromine to form BrOSeF_{5}.
