= Sulfuryl bromide fluoride =

Names
- Preferred IUPAC name Sulfuryl bromide fluoride
- Other names Sulfuryl bromofluoride, sulfur bromide fluoride oxide

Identifiers
CAS Number	13536-61-3
3D model (JSmol)	Interactive image
ChemSpider	10326167
PubChem CID	23234052
CompTox Dashboard (EPA)	DTXSID60631359
- InChI: InChI=1S/BrFO2S/c1-5(2,3)4 Key: UQNIKEMUVZTZID-UHFFFAOYSA-N
- SMILES: O=S(=O)(F)Br

Properties
Chemical formula	BrFO_{2}S
Molar mass	162.96 g·mol^{−1}
Appearance	Colorless liquid
Melting point	−86 °C (−123 °F; 187 K)
Boiling point	41 °C (106 °F; 314 K)
Solubility in water	Reacts with water

Hazards
Flash point	−273.15 °C (−459.67 °F; 0.00 K)

Related compounds
Related compounds	Sulfuryl chloride fluoride; Sulfuryl fluoride; Disulfuryl fluoride; Trisulfuryl fluoride
- Except where otherwise noted, data are given for materials in their standard state (at 25 °C [77 °F], 100 kPa). Infobox references

Sulfuryl bromide fluoride is an inorganic compound of bromine, fluorine, oxygen, and sulfur with the chemical formula BrFO_{2}S.

== Synthesis ==
Synthesis of sulfuryl bromide fluoride can be by a reaction of bromine, bromine trifluoride, and sulfur dioxide:

Br_{2} + BrF_{3} → 3 BrF
SO_{2} + BrF → SO_{2}BrF

== Physical properties ==
Sulfuryl fluoride bromide forms a colorless liquid that, when standing in humid air, turns slightly red due to the release of elemental bromine.

Sulfuryl bromide fluoride reacts slowly with glass, but has no effect on quartz.

== Chemical properties ==
Sulfuryl bromide fluoride violently reacts with water:

SO_{2}BrF + 2 H_{2}O → H_{2}SO_{4} + HBr + HF
