= Triiodine fluorosulfate =

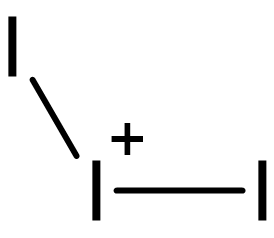

Names
- Other names: Iodine fluorosulfate iodide; Triiodine fluorosulfonate

Identifiers
CAS Number	13537-36-5
3D model (JSmol)	Interactive image
- InChI: InChI=1S/FHO3S.I3/c1-5(2,3)4;1-3-2/h(H,2,3,4);/q;+1/p-1 Key: GBXBCNLVCWGHPO-UHFFFAOYSA-M
- SMILES: O=S(=O)([O-])F.I[I+]I

Properties
Chemical formula	FI_{3}O_{3}S
Molar mass	479.77 g·mol^{−1}
Appearance	brown solid
Density	1.7844 g/cm^{3}
Melting point	92 °C (198 °F; 365 K)
- Except where otherwise noted, data are given for materials in their standard state (at 25 °C [77 °F], 100 kPa). Infobox references

Triiodine fluorosulfate is the inorganic compound with the chemical formula I_{3}SO_{3}F. It is the fluorosulfate (SO_{3}F^{−}) salt of the I^{+}_{3} polyhalogen ion.

== Synthesis ==
Triiodine fluorosulfonate is obtained from iodine and iodine(I) fluorosulfonate at 85 °C.

I_{2} + ISO_{3}F → I_{3}SO_{3}F

Also, a reaction of iodine with peroxydisulfuryl difluoride:

3I_{2} + S_{2}O_{6}F_{2} → 2I_{3}SO_{3}F

== Chemical characteristics ==
The compound hydrolyzes well in water and dissolves in sulfuric acid.

It reacts with tetrafluoroethylene (C_{2}F_{4}) to form ICF_{2}CF_{2}O_{3}SF and I_{2}.

== See also ==
- Bromine fluorosulfate
- Chlorine fluorosulfate
- Iodine fluorosulfate
