= Fluorine fluorosulfate =

Identifiers
CAS Number	13536-85-1
3D model (JSmol)	Interactive image
ChemSpider	10329038
PubChem CID	19971358
- InChI: InChI=1S/F2O3S/c1-5-6(2,3)4 Key: NTZQXTIIJGXIMQ-UHFFFAOYSA-N
- SMILES: FS(=O)(=O)OF

Properties
Chemical formula	F_{2}O_{3}S
Molar mass	118.05 g·mol^{−1}
Appearance	colorless gas
Density	1.7844 g/cm^{3}
Melting point	−158.5 °C
Boiling point	−31.3 °C
Solubility in water	reacts with water
- Except where otherwise noted, data are given for materials in their standard state (at 25 °C [77 °F], 100 kPa). Infobox references

Fluorine fluorosulfate is an inorganic compound of fluorine, oxygen, and sulfur with the chemical formula F_{2}O_{3}S.

== Synthesis ==
The compound can be prepared by the reaction of sulfur trioxide and fluorine at a temperature of 200 °C:

SO_{3} + F_{2} → FOSO_{2}F

Also, a reaction of peroxydisulfuryl difluoride with fluorine.

== Physical characteristics ==
The compound is a strong oxidizing agent that is also potentially explosive.

At 200 °C the compound decomposes without explosion.

== Chemical properties ==
The compound reacts with bases to form the fluorosulfonate anion, the fluoride ion, water, and oxygen:

FSO_{3}F + 2 H^{^{−}} → SO_{3}F^{^{−}} + F^{^{−}} + H_{2}O + 1/_{2}O_{2}

It reacts with potassium iodide to form potassium fluorosulfonate, potassium fluoride, and iodine:

FSO_{3}F + 2 KI → KSO_{3}F + KF + I_{2}

Fluorine fluorosulfate reacts with SSF_{2}, SeF_{4}, AsF_{3}, and MoF_{5} and also with SF_{4}, Br_{2}, and I_{2}. All compounds react exothermically, and sometimes explosively, between 80–298 K.

== See also ==
- Bromine fluorosulfate
- Chlorine fluorosulfate
- Iodine fluorosulfate
