= Trisulfuryl fluoride =

Names
- Preferred IUPAC name bis(fluorosulfonyl) sulfate
- Other names Trisulfuryl difluoride

Identifiers
CAS Number	13709-33-6
3D model (JSmol)	Interactive image
PubChem CID	101282779
- InChI: InChI=1S/F2O8S3/c1-11(3,4)9-13(7,8)10-12(2,5)6 Key: UOBKEQZSWBMYKP-UHFFFAOYSA-N
- SMILES: O=S(=O)(OS(=O)(=O)F)OS(=O)(=O)F

Properties
Chemical formula	F_{2}O_{8}S_{3}
Molar mass	262.17 g·mol^{−1}
Appearance	colorless liquid
Density	1.86 g/cm^{3}
Boiling point	120 °C
- Except where otherwise noted, data are given for materials in their standard state (at 25 °C [77 °F], 100 kPa). Infobox references

Trisulfuryl fluoride is an inorganic compound of fluorine, oxygen, and sulfur with the chemical formula S_{3}O_{8}F_{2}.

== Synthesis ==
The compound is obtained by the thermal disassociation of KBF_{4}·4SO_{3} or via reaction of potassium tetrafluoroborate (KBF_{4}) with sulfur trioxide (SO_{3}) at 70 °C.

Also, trisulfuryl fluoride is formed in a reaction of sulfur trioxide (SO_{3}), boron trifluoride (BF_{3}), and 70% sulfuric acid (H_{2}SO_{4}) at 70 °C.

== Chemical properties ==
Trisulfuryl fluoride is a reactive compound. It is known to decompose into disulfuryl fluoride when heated. The compound reacts with certain compounds, like the sodium cyanohydrin salt, to form other fluorosulfates.

It slowly hydrolizes in the solution of potassium hydroxide (KOH):

S_{3}O_{8}F_{2} + 4KOH → 2KSO_{3}F + K_{2}SO_{4} + 2H_{2}O

== Physical properties ==
The compound forms a colorless liquid. It fumes in air and is insoluble in the concentrated H_{2}SO_{4}.

== See also ==
- Sulfuryl chloride
- Sulfuryl fluoride
- Disulfuryl chloride
- Disulfuryl fluoride
- Trisulfuryl chloride
