= Trifluorosulfite =

Trifluorosulfite is an anion containing sulfur in a +4 oxidation state, three fluorine atoms and one oxygen atom with formula [SOF_{3}]^{−}. It may form salts with cations with low fluoride affinity.

== Preparation ==
Trifluorosulfite salts can be made by reacting a fluoride salt with thionyl fluoride SOF_{2} at or below room temperature.

MF + SOF_{2} → MSOF_{3}

Fluorosulfite may be fluoronated in a compound to yield triflurosulfite.

In the gas phase SOF_{4} could add an electron to form SOF_{4}^{−} which in a collision would break up to mostly form SOF_{3}^{−}.

== Properties ==
Chemical structure of trifluorosulfite anion

=== Shape ===
The shape is a distorted trigonal bipyrimid. Two fluorines and the sulfur are almost colinear, and those fluorine atoms are called "axial". At right angles to this axis are the equatorial oxygen and fluorine atoms. A lone pair of electrons is opposite these. The symmetry of the molecule is C_{s}.

The bond lengths are calculated as S-F axial = 1.79 Å; S-F equatorial = 1.60 Å; S=O = 1.43 Å. The angles between the bonds are ∠(O=S-Fequatorial) = 106.7° and ∠(Faxial-S-Faxial) = 166.5° (so not quite a 180° straight line).

=== spectrum ===
The infrared spectrum shows absorption lines at 1189 cm−1 due to S=O vibration, 725 from S-F equatorial vibration , 504 from S-F axial vibration. 403 OSF equatorial scissor, 383 OSF equatorial rock. The Raman spectrum has a few more lines. Trifluorosulfite salts can dissolve in acetonitrile and other polar solvents.

== Reactions ==
Trifluorosulfite salts react with water to form fluorosulfite and sulfite compounds. It also reacts with liquid sulfur dioxide to yield a fluorosulfite.

In the gas phase the trifluorosulfite ion reacts with phosphorus trifluoride, boron trifluoride, silicon tetrafluoride, and sulfur dioxide to form fluoronated ions and thionyl fluoride.

== Related ==
Related anions include trifluorosulfate [SO_{2}F_{3}]^{−}, pentafluorosulfite SF_{5}^{−}, and fluorosulfite [SO_{2}F]^{−}.

== List ==
formula	comment	ref
Me_{4}N^{+}SOF_{3}^{-}		
trans-[Pt(F)(SOF_{3})(PCy_{3})_{2}]	below 283K	
