= Sulfamoyl fluoride =

Chemical functional group

In organic chemistry, sulfamoyl fluoride is an organic compound having the chemical formula F−SO_{2}−N(−R^{1})−R^{2}. Its derivatives are called sulfamoyl fluorides.

Examples of sulfamoyl fluorides include:

Derivative of F−SO_{2}−N(−R^{1})−R^{2}'	R^{1}	R^{2}
sulfamyl fluoride	Hydrogen (H)	Hydrogen (H)
difluorosulfamyl fluoride	Fluorine (F)	Fluorine (F)
dimethylsulfamoyl fluoride	Methyl (CH_{3})	Methyl (CH_{3})
N-sulfinylsulfamoyl fluoride	Thionyl (S=O)	none
chloro(trifluoro-methyl)sulfamoyl fluoride	Chlorine (Cl)	Trifluoromethyl (CF_{3})
bis(trifluoromethyl)-sulfamoyl fluoride		
1,2-hydrazinedisulfonyl fluoride (an inorganic dimer)		

Sulfamoyl fluorides are contrasted with the sulfonimidoyl fluorides with structure R^{1}-S(O)(F)=N-R^{2}.

== Production ==
Sulfamoyl fluorides can be made by treating secondary amines with sulfuryl fluoride (SO_{2}F_{2}) or sulfuryl chloride fluoride (SO_{2}ClF). Cyclic secondary amines work as well, provided they are not aromatic.

Sulfamoyl fluorides can also be made from sulfamoyl chlorides, by reacting with a substance that can supply the fluoride ion, such as NaF, KF, HF, or SbF_{3}.

Sulfonamides can undergo a Hofmann rearrangement when treated with a difluoro-λ^{3}-bromane to yield a singly substituted N-sulfamoyl fluoride.

== See also ==
- Fluorosulfonate
- Sulfonyl halide
- Sulfuryl fluoride
