= Bromine(I) fluorosulfonate =

Names
- Other names Bromine(I) fluorosulfate, bromine fluorosulfate

Identifiers
CAS Number	13997-93-8
3D model (JSmol)	Interactive image
ChemSpider	67033872
PubChem CID	13267198
- InChI: InChI=1S/BrFO3S/c1-5-6(2,3)4 Key: BWQHCHYXXFFAKU-UHFFFAOYSA-N
- SMILES: O=S(=O)(OBr)F

Properties
Chemical formula	BrFO_{3}S
Molar mass	178.96 g·mol^{−1}
Appearance	blackish-red liquid
Density	2.60 g/cm^{3}
Boiling point	120.5 °C
Solubility in water	reacts with water
- Except where otherwise noted, data are given for materials in their standard state (at 25 °C [77 °F], 100 kPa). Infobox references

Bromine(I) fluorosulfonate is an inorganic compound of bromine, sulfur, fluorine, and oxygen with the chemical formula BrSO_{3}F. This is a monovalent compound of bromine from the group of fluorosulfonates.

== Synthesis ==
Similarly with other halogenofluorosulfonates, the reaction of bromine with peroxydisulfuryl difluoride produces the compound:

Br_{2} + S_{2}O_{6}F_{2} → 2BrSO_{3}F

The reduction of bromine(III) fluorosulfonate also yields bromine(I) fluorosulfonate:

Br(SO_{3}F)_{3} + Br_{2} → 3BrSO_{3}F

== Chemical properties ==
Bromo(I) fluorosulfonate is a blackish-red, viscous, hydrolysis-sensitive liquid that reacts violently with water. Upon cooling, it solidifies into a glassy state.

Bromo(I) fluorosulfonate reacts with iodine(I) fluorosulfonate at temperatures above 50 °C to form dibromoiodofluorosulfonate:

2BrSO_{3}F + ISO_{3}F → IBr_{2}(SO_{3}F)_{3}

== See also ==
- Iodine fluorosulfate
- Fluorine fluorosulfate
- Chlorine fluorosulfate
- Triiodine fluorosulfate
