= Trisulfuryl chloride =

Names
- Preferred IUPAC name Bis(chlorosulfonyl) sulfate
- Other names Trisulfuryl dichloride, sulfuric bischloridosulfuric acid dianhydride, [(chlorosulfonyl)oxy]sulfonyl sulfurochloridate

Identifiers
CAS Number	13637-77-9
3D model (JSmol)	Interactive image
PubChem CID	101282780
- InChI: InChI=1S/Cl2O8S3/c1-11(3,4)9-13(7,8)10-12(2,5)6 Key: QRCGDDSWWPZGAR-UHFFFAOYSA-N
- SMILES: O=S(=O)(OS(=O)(=O)Cl)OS(=O)(=O)Cl

Properties
Chemical formula	Cl_{2}O_{8}S_{3}
Molar mass	295.07 g·mol^{−1}
Appearance	liquid
Solubility in water	reacts with water
- Except where otherwise noted, data are given for materials in their standard state (at 25 °C [77 °F], 100 kPa). Infobox references

Trisulfuryl chloride is an inorganic compound of chlorine, oxygen, and sulfur with the chemical formula S_{3}O_{8}Cl_{2}.

== Synthesis ==
Trisulfuryl chloride is obtained from sulfur trioxide and carbon tetrachloride at 80 °C:

3SO_{3} + CCl_{4} → S_{3}O_{8}Cl_{2} + OCCl_{2}

== Properties ==
The compound decomposes to disulfuryl chloride and SO_{3} when heated to 116 °C:

S_{3}O_{8}Cl_{2} → S_{2}O_{5}Cl_{2} + SO_{3}

It fumes in air and hydrolizes slowly in cold water. It is insoluble in concentrated H_{2}SO_{4}.

== See also ==
- Sulfuryl chloride
- Sulfuryl fluoride
- Disulfuryl chloride
- Disulfuryl fluoride
- Trisulfuryl fluoride
