= Bromine(III) fluorosulfonate =

Names
- Other names Bromine(III) fluorosulfate

Identifiers
CAS Number	29880-59-9
3D model (JSmol)	Interactive image
PubChem CID	101946339
- InChI: InChI=1S/BrF3O9S3/c2-14(5,6)11-1(12-15(3,7)8)13-16(4,9)10 Key: JFKXOQNWJGZCCB-UHFFFAOYSA-N
- SMILES: O=S(=O)(OBr(OS(=O)(=O)F)OS(=O)(=O)F)F

Properties
Chemical formula	BrF_{3}O_{9}S_{3}
Molar mass	377.07 g·mol^{−1}
Appearance	orange crystals
Melting point	59 °C
Solubility in water	reacts with water
- Except where otherwise noted, data are given for materials in their standard state (at 25 °C [77 °F], 100 kPa). Infobox references

Bromine(III) fluorosulfonate is an inorganic compound of bromine, sulfur, fluorine, and oxygen with the chemical formula Br(SO_{3}F)_{3}. This is a trivalent compound of bromine from the group of fluorosulfonates.

== Synthesis ==
The compound is formed as a reaction product of bromine and peroxydisulfuryl difluoride:

Br_{2} + 3S_{2}O_{6}F_{2} ⟶ 2Br(SO_{3}F)_{3}

== Chemical properties ==
Bromine(III) fluorosulfonate is very hygroscopic and reacts exothermically with water:

4Br(SO_{3}F)_{3} + 6H_{2}O ⟶ 2Br_{2} + 3O_{2} + 12HSO_{3}F

The monovalent bromine(I) fluorosulfonate can be formed by adding bromine to bromine(III) fluorosulfonate:

Br(SO_{3}F)_{3} + Br_{2} → 3 BrSO_{3}F
