= Fluoride nitrate =

Fluoride nitrates are mixed anion compounds that contain both fluoride ions and nitrate ions. Compounds are known for some amino acids and for some heavy elements. Some transition metal fluorido complexes that are nitrates are also known. There are also fluorido nitrato complex ions known in solution.

== List ==
| name | formula | mw | crystal system | space group | unit cell Å | volume | density | comment | reference |
|---|---|---|---|---|---|---|---|---|---|
| L-Argininium | L-Arg^{2+}•F^{−}•NO_{3}^{−} | | triclinic | P1 | a=5.0130 b=10.6161 c=11.0352 α=87.471 β=86.038 γ=78.157 Z=2 | | | | |
| | 2L-Arg^{2+}•F^{−}•3NO_{3}^{−}•HF | | orthorhombic | P2_{1}2_{1}2_{1} | a=7.3960 b=12.8672 c=26.990 Z=4 | | | | |
| L-histidine | L-His^{2+}•F^{−}•NO_{3}^{−} | | | | | | | | |
| | (NH_{4})_{3}SiF_{6}NO_{3} | | | P6_{3}/mmc | | | | | |
| | [Cr(NH_{3})_{5}F](NO_{3})_{2} | | | | | | | | |
| hexakis(1H-imidazole)-cobalt(ii) fluoride nitrate tetrahydrate | [Co(Im)_{6}][F·NO_{3}•(H_{2}O)_{4}] | | hexagonal | P6_{3}/m | a 8.972 c 21.077 Z=2 | 1469.3 | 1.402 | pink | |
| | [Co(NH_{3})_{4}(OH)F]NO_{3} | | | | | | | | |
| | [Co(NH_{3})_{5}F](NO_{3})_{2} | | | | | | | | |
| | [Co(NH_{3})_{6}]F(NO_{3})_{2} | | | | | | | | |
| | [Co(en)_{2}F_{2}]NO_{3} | | | | | | | | |
| | [As(ONO_{2})_{4}]^{+}[AsF_{6}]^{−} | | | | | | | pale yellow; hydroscopic | |
| | [Zr_{2}F_{3}OH(NO_{3})_{2}(H_{2}O)_{5}]^{2+} | | | | | | | in solution | |
| | SnF_{2}(ONO_{2})_{2} | | | | | | | | |
| | SnF_{3}(ONO_{2}) | | | | | | | stable < 40 °C; hydroscopic | |
| | Rb_{2}SnF_{2}NO_{3} | | | C2/m | | | | birefringence 0.05 at 1064 nm | |
| | SbF(ONO_{2})_{4} | | | | | | | | |
| | SbF_{3}(ONO_{2})_{2} | | | | | | | birefringence 0.098 at 546 nm | |
| | (NH_{4})_{3}SbF_{4}(NO_{3})_{2} | | orthorhombic | Pnma | | | | birefringence 0.164 at 546 nm | |
| | (NH_{4})_{3}SbF_{3}(NO_{3})_{3} | | | P2_{1} | | | | | |
| | Rb_{2}SbF_{3}(NO_{3})_{2} | | | P2_{1} | | | | | |
| Xenon fluoride nitrate | FXeONO_{2} | | monoclinic | | a = 4.6663 b = 8.799 c = 9.415 β = 90.325° | 386.6 | 3.648 | | |
| | CsFHONO_{2} | | | | | | | | |
| | [HfF_{4}NO_{3}]^{−} | | | | | | | in solution | |
| | [HfF_{3}(NO_{3})_{2}]^{−} | | | | | | | in solution | |
| | Hg_{3}O_{2}(NO_{3})F | | orthorhombic | Pnma | a=7.547 b=10.990 c=6.9906 | | | birefringence Δn = 0.23 @ 1064 nm | |
| | Hg_{16}O_{12}(NO_{3})_{6}F_{2}(H_{2}O) | | orthorhombic | Ibca | a=11.6751 b=13.5050 c=20.727 Z=1 | 3268 | 7.783 | birefringence 0.17 at 546 nm | |
| | Pb_{2}(NO_{3})_{2}(H_{2}O)F_{2} | | | Amm2 | | | | birefringence 0.230 at 1064 nm | |
| | Pb_{3}F_{5}NO_{3} | | triclinic | P1̅ | a 7.3796 b 12.147 c 16.8549, α 100.46° β 90.076° γ 95.517° | | | layered; stable to 450 °C | |
| | Pb(OF)Cu_{3}(SeO_{3})_{2}(NO_{3}) | | trigonal | R3m | a 6.6973 c 18.5548 Z=3 | 720.75 | 5.175 | yellow; stable to 400 °C | |
| | PbCdF(SeO_{3})(NO_{3}) | | orthorhombic | Pca2_{1} | a=11.121 b=10.366 c=5.3950 | | | NLO 2.6×KDP; band gap 4.42 eV | |
| | BaPb_{2}F_{5}NO_{3} | | | | | | | | |
| | Bi_{2}OF_{3}(NO_{3}) | | hexagonal | P6_{3}/m | | | | band gap 3.5 eV | |
| | Bi_{6}O_{6}F_{5}(NO_{3}) | | trigonal | R3 | | | | band gap 4.0 eV | |
| | [(UO_{2})_{4}F_{13}][Sr_{3}(H_{2}O)_{8}](NO_{3})·H_{2}O | 1814.13 | triclinic | P1̅ | a = 10.793, b = 10.918, c = 13.231 α = 92.570°, β = 109.147°, γ = 92.778° Z = 2. | 1468.1 | 4.105 | yellow | |
