= Pentafluorosulfur hypofluorite =

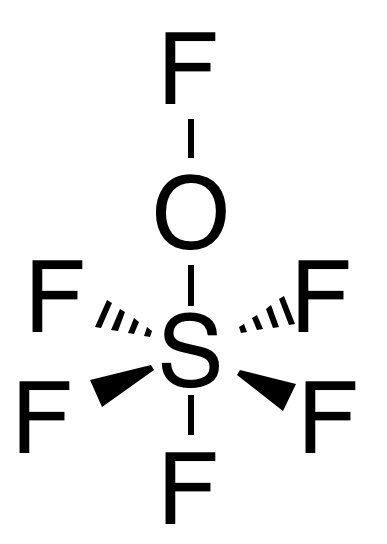

Names
- IUPAC name Pentafluorosulfur hypofluorite
- Other names: Sulfur fluoride hypofluorite; Thionyl fluoride hypofluorite

Identifiers
CAS Number	15179-32-5
3D model (JSmol)	Interactive image
PubChem CID	14901760
CompTox Dashboard (EPA)	DTXSID501230641
- InChI: InChI=1S/F6OS/c1-7-8(2,3,4,5)6 Key: DGQBNDRZRZYTER-UHFFFAOYSA-N
- SMILES: S(F)(F)(F)(F)(F)OF

Properties
Chemical formula	SOF_{6}
Molar mass	162.05 g·mol^{−1}
Appearance	Colorless gas
Density	1.947 at -47.2 °C
Melting point	−86 °C (−123 °F; 187 K)
Boiling point	−35.1 °C (−31.2 °F; 238.1 K)
Solubility in water	Reacts with water
log P	6.03633-420.35/T-78360/T^{2}

Related compounds
Related oxohalides	Thionyl tetrafluoride; Thionyl fluoride; Sulfonyl fluoride
Related compounds	Sulfuryl fluoride; Sulfur hexafluoride; Pentafluorooxosulfuric acid; bis-(Pentafluorosulfur) oxide; bis-(Pentafluorosulfur) peroxide; bis-(Pentafluorosulfur) trioxide
- Except where otherwise noted, data are given for materials in their standard state (at 25 °C [77 °F], 100 kPa). Infobox references

Pentafluorosulfur hypofluorite is an inorganic compound with the chemical formula SOF_{6}. In standard conditions it is a colorless gas. It is an oxyfluoride of sulfur, where sulfur is in the +6 oxidation state, with a fluorine atom attached to oxygen.

== Synthesis ==
SOF_{6} can be made by reacting thionyl fluoride with fluorine at 200 °C with a silver difluoride catalyst.

SOF_{2} + 2 F_{2} → SOF_{6} (+ some SOF_{4})

The synthesis can also be performed from fluorine and thionyl fluoride or thionyl tetrafluoride using caesium fluoride as catalyst at room temperature.

== Properties ==
The molecular shape has five fluorine and one oxygen atom arranged around a sulfur atom in an octahedral arrangement. Another fluorine atom is attached to the oxygen in almost a straight line with the S-O connection. So the molecular formula can also be written as SF_{5}−OF. The average S-F distance is 1.53 Å. The angles ∠FSF and ∠FSO are 90°.

The neat ^{19}F nuclear magnetic resonance spectrum of SOF_{6} was reported using SF_{6} as internal standard. With this reference, a -131.5 ppm shift for the hypofluorite fluorine, a +1.75 ppm shift for F_{ax} and a +3.64 ppm shift for the four F_{eq} was observed. A 17.4 Hz ^{19}F-^{19}F_{eq} spin coupling (O-F to SF_{4}) and a 155 Hz coupling constant was measured for ^{19}F_{ax}-^{19}F_{eq} in OSF_{5}. No coupling was observed between the hypofluorite and the F_{ax}.

A neat (uncorrected) refined ^{19}F nuclear magnetic resonance spectrum of SOF_{6} was recorded at -80°C. A first order quintet was observed for F-OSF_{5} at 183.9 ppm with a ^{3}J(F,F_{eq}) coupling of 17.5 Hz. A high order AB_{4} system was observed for both the F_{eq} and F_{ax} of the OSF_{5} moiety. The S–F_{ax} shift is 52.2 ppm and the S–F_{eq} is 50.3 ppm with a measured ^{2}J(F_{eq},F_{ax}) of 153.5 Hz.

== Reactions ==
Iodide is oxidised to iodine

SOF_{6} + 2 I^{−} + H_{2}O → SO_{2}F_{2} + I_{2} + 2 HF + 2 F^{−}

Alkalis such as potassium hydroxide react

2 SOF_{6} + 12 OH^{−} → O_{2} + 10 F^{−} + 5 H_{2}O + 2 SO_{3}F^{−}

Alkenes react to add to a double bond, with −OSF_{5} on one carbon, and −F on the other.

C_{2}H_{4} + SOF_{6} → FH_{2}C−CH_{2}−O−SF_{5}.

C_{2}F_{4} + SOF_{6} → CF_{3}−CF_{2}−O−SF_{5}.

CF_{3}−CF_{2}−O−SF_{5} boils at 15°C.

SOF_{6} + ClCH=CH_{2} → FClCH−CH_{2}−O−SF_{5}

SOF_{6} + FCH=CH_{2} → F_{2}CH−CH_{2}−O−SF_{5}

SOF_{6} + F_{2}C=CH_{2} → F_{3}C−CH_{2}−O−SF_{5}

SOF_{6} + SOF_{4} → mixture of SF_{6}, SOF_{4}, bis-(pentafluorosulfur) peroxide F_{5}S−O−O−SF_{5} and bis-(pentafluorosulfur) oxide F_{5}S−O−SF_{5}.

Thermal decomposition produces sulfur hexafluoride and oxygen.

2 SOF_{6} + heat over 210° → 2 SF_{6} + O_{2}.

Some reactions of SOF_{6} result in fluorination of other molecules

SOF_{6} + CO → F_{2}CO + SOF_{4}.

SOF_{6} + F_{2}CO → SF_{5}−O−O−CF_{3}

SOF_{6} + SO_{3} → F_{5}S−O−O−SO_{2}F

SOF_{6} + N_{2}F_{4} → F_{5}S−O−NF_{2}

3 SOF_{6} + Br_{2} → 2 BrF_{3} + 3 SOF_{4}

5 SOF_{6} + I_{2} → 2 IF_{5} + 5 SOF_{4}

PF_{3} + SOF_{6} → PF_{5} + SOF_{4}

NO_{2} + SOF_{6} → 2 NO_{2}F
