= Fluorosulfite =

Names
- Other names Sulfurofluoridoite

Identifiers
CAS Number	22539-11-3
3D model (JSmol)	Interactive image
ChemSpider	24807319
PubChem CID	13152769
CompTox Dashboard (EPA)	DTXSID60522430
- InChI: InChI=1S/FHO2S/c1-4(2)3/h(H,2,3)/p-1 Key: HMKJMFKGFGKCPL-UHFFFAOYSA-M
- SMILES: [O-]S(=O)F

Properties
Chemical formula	FO_{2}S^{−1}
Molar mass	83.06 g·mol^{−1}

Related compounds
Other anions	Pentafluorosulfite [SF_{5}]^{−} Trifluorosulfite [SOF_{3}]^{−}
- Except where otherwise noted, data are given for materials in their standard state (at 25 °C [77 °F], 100 kPa). Infobox references

Fluorosulfite is an ion with the formula SO_{2}F^{−}. The term is also used for compounds or salts containing this group. Fluorosulfite was discovered in 1953 by F Seel and H Meier.

Organic compounds with the name "fluorosulfite" contain the group -OS(O)F.

== Preparation ==
[((CH_{3})_{2}N)_{3}SO][SO_{2}F] can be prepared from OSF_{4} and Me_{3}SiNMe_{2}. Alkali metal fluorosulfites can be made by soaking the metal fluoride in liquid sulfur dioxide for a few days. β-CsSO_{2}F converts to α-CsSO_{2}F when heated to 110 °C for a couple of days but remains stable below 50 °C.

== Properties ==
The fluorosulfite ion is tetrahedral, with sulfur at the top. The oxygen to sulfur bonds are 147.8 pm and the fluorine to sulfur bond is >169.0 pm long. In solid ionic fluorosulfites, the ion is not fixed in orientation and continuously turns around resulting in dynamic disorder. At room temperature this turning rate is from 2×10^{5} to 10^{7} Hz. When cooled the rate of rotation slows, and can be frozen in place, resulting in static disorder.

Fluorosulfite is isoelectronic with chloryl fluoride (ClO_{2}F) and in compounds it resembles chlorate (ClO_{3}^{−}).

The heat of formation from fluoride (F^{−}) and sulfur dioxide (SO_{2}) is 50 kcal mol^{−1}.

== Reactions ==
Fluorosulfites can react with chlorophosphazenes to make fluorophosphazenes:

(NPCl_{2})_{n} + 2n KSO_{2}F → (NPF_{2})_{n} + 2n KCl + 2nSO_{2} n=3 or 4

== Related ==
Fluorosulfite is in the category of halosulfite ions which include chlorosulfite, bromosulfite and iodosulfite. Related ions include cyanosulfite SO_{2}CN^{−}.

== List ==
name	formula	weight	system	space group	unit cell	volume	density	properties	ref
	NO[SO_{2}F]								
2-chloro-1,3-diisopropyl-4,5-dimethylimidazolium fluorosulfite	C_{11}H_{20}FClN_{2}O_{2}S								
2-fluoro-1,3-diisopropyl-4,5-dimethylimidazolium fluorosulfite	C_{11}H_{20}F_{2}N_{2}O_{2}S			P2_{1}/c	a=15.097 b=13.406 c=15.776 β=113.54 Z=8	2927			
(difluoromethyl)triphenylphosphonium fluorosulfite	[Ph_{3}PCF_{2}H][SO_{2}F]							white, melt ~240 °C	
tetramethylammonium fluorosulfite	[(CH_{3})_{4}N][SO_{2}F]	157.21	orthorhombic	Pbca	a=11.520 b=11.505 c=11.627 Z=8	1541.0	1.355		
tris-dimethylamino sulfonium fluorosulfite	[((CH_{3})_{2}N)_{3}S][SO_{2}F]	247.35	orthorhombic	Pnma	a=14.690 b=11.174 c=7.3340 Z=4	1203.8	1.365		
tris-dimethylamino sulfoxonium fluorosulfite	[((CH_{3})_{2}N)_{3}SO][SO_{2}F]	263.65	orthorhombic	Pna2_{1}	a=21.850 b=6.733 c=8.194 Z=4	1205.5	1.451		
potassium fluorosulfite	KSO_{2}F	122.16	monoclinic	P2_{1}/m	a=6.9725 b=5.6713 c=4.6653 β=107.702° Z=2	175.75	2.308		
rubidium fluorosulfite	RbSO_{2}F		monoclinic	P2_{1}/m	a=7.175 b=5.859 c=4.8416 β=107.18° Z=2	194.45	2.878		
alpha caesium fluorosulfite	α-CsSO_{2}F		orthorhombic	Pnma	a=7.9098 b=6.6607 c=7.9893 z=4	420.91	3.408		
beta caesium fluorosulfite	β-CsSO_{2}F		rhombohedral	R3m	a=6.5922 c=8.0050 z=3	301.27	3.571		
