= SF5 =

Sf5 or variation may refer to:

- Disulfur decafluoride (S_{2}F_{10}), a chemical reductively rendered as "SF_{5}" (monosulfur pentafluoride)
- Pentafluorosulfate(IV) (SF^{−}_{5}), an anionic chemical compound
- Street Fighter V, a fighting video game
- CASA SF-5, Spanish-built license production variants of the Northrup F-5 Tiger II Freedom Fighter jet fighter
- Sablatnig SF-5, German WWI reconnaissance seaplane
- USS V-2 (SF-5), U.S. Navy Barracuda-class submarine
- SF Motors SF5, an electric sport utility sedan
- Sf5 glass

== See also ==
- SF (disambiguation)
