= Disulfuryl chloride fluoride =

Names
- Preferred IUPAC name [(fluorosulfonyl)oxy]sulfonyl chloride
- Other names: Chloridosulfuric fluoridosulfuric anhydride; Pyrosulfuryl chloride fluoride; Sulfur(VI) pentoxychloride fluoride

Identifiers
CAS Number	13637-85-9
3D model (JSmol)	Interactive image
ChemSpider	103871276
PubChem CID	101943079
CompTox Dashboard (EPA)	DTXSID501308872
- InChI: InChI=1S/ClFO5S2/c1-8(3,4)7-9(2,5)6 Key: FKKHMCZBUXHJDY-UHFFFAOYSA-N
- SMILES: O=S(=O)(OS(=O)(=O)Cl)F

Properties
Chemical formula	ClFO_{5}S_{2}
Molar mass	198.56 g·mol^{−1}
Appearance	colorless liquid
Density	1.7934 g/cm^{3}
Boiling point	100 °C (212 °F; 373 K)
Solubility in water	reacts with water
- Except where otherwise noted, data are given for materials in their standard state (at 25 °C [77 °F], 100 kPa). Infobox references

Disulfuryl chloride fluoride (pyrosulfuryl chloride fluoride) is an inorganic compound of sulfur, chlorine, fluorine, and oxygen with the chemical formula S_{2}O_{5}ClF. Structurally, it is the chlorofluorosulfuric acid analog of disulfuric acid, or the mixed anhydride of chlorosulfuric acid and fluorosulfuric acid.

== Synthesis ==
Rapid heating of fluorosulfonic acid and cyanuric chloride:

6HSO_{3}F + (CNCl)_{3} → 3S_{2}O_{5}ClF + (HNCO)_{3} + 3HF

Also, a reaction of disulfuryl chloride (S_{2}O_{5}Cl_{2}) on silver monofluoride (AgF) at 80-90 °C.

== Physical properties ==
Disulfuryl chloride fluoride is a colorless liquid.

The compound hydrolyzes in water.

== See also ==
- Sulfuryl chloride fluoride
- Disulfuryl fluoride
- Disulfuryl chloride
- Peroxydisulfuryl difluoride
