= Iodine(I) fluorosulfonate =

Names
- Other names Iodine(I) fluorosulfate, iodine fluorosulfate

Identifiers
CAS Number	13537-34-3
3D model (JSmol)	Interactive image
ChemSpider	74012740
PubChem CID	13267199
- InChI: InChI=1S/FIO3S/c1-6(3,4)5-2 Key: SQEZHUFQILAKPK-UHFFFAOYSA-N
- SMILES: O=S(=O)(OI)F

Properties
Chemical formula	FIO_{3}S
Molar mass	225.96 g·mol^{−1}
Appearance	black crystals
Melting point	51.5 °C
Solubility in water	reacts with water
- Except where otherwise noted, data are given for materials in their standard state (at 25 °C [77 °F], 100 kPa). Infobox references

Iodine(I) fluorosulfonate is an inorganic compound of iodine, sulfur, fluorine, and oxygen with the chemical formula ISO_{3}F. This is a monovalent compound of iodine from the group of fluorosulfonates.

== Synthesis ==
Like the other halofluorosulfonates, iodine(I) fluorosulfonate can be obtained from iodine and peroxydisulfuryl difluoride:

I_{2} + S_{2}O_{6}F_{2} → 2ISO_{3}F

== Chemical properties ==
Reaction with iodine at 85 °C can convert iodine(I) fluorosulfate to triiodine fluorosulfonate.

I_{2} + ISO_{3}F → I_{3}SO_{3}F

When dissolved in carbon tetrachloride, iodine monochloride, peroxydisulfuryl difluoride, and phosgene are formed:

2ISO_{3}F + CCl_{4} → 2ICl + S_{2}O_{6}F_{2} + COCl_{2}

However, carbon dioxide can also be produced instead of phosgene:

4ISO_{3}F + CCl_{4} → 4 ICl + 2 S_{2}O_{6}F_{2} + CO_{2}

== Physical properties ==
The compound forms black crystals.

== See also ==
- Bromine fluorosulfate
- Fluorine fluorosulfate
- Chlorine fluorosulfate
- Triiodine fluorosulfate
