= Xenon nitrate =

Chemical compound

Identifiers
3D model (JSmol)	Interactive image
- InChI: InChI=1S/N2O6Xe/c3-1(4)7-9-8-2(5)6 Key: DDUBBJJTDIIEIU-UHFFFAOYSA-N
- SMILES: [O-][N+](=O)O[Xe]O[N+](=O)[O-]

Properties
Chemical formula	N_{2}O_{6}Xe
Molar mass	255.301 g·mol^{−1}

Related compounds
Related compounds	FXeNO_{3}
- Except where otherwise noted, data are given for materials in their standard state (at 25 °C [77 °F], 100 kPa). Infobox references

Xenon nitrate, also called xenon dinitrate, is an inorganic compound consisting of one xenon atom bonded to two nitrate groups. It can be made by reacting xenon difluoride with anhydrous nitric acid, but it only exists transiently before decomposing, and therefore it has not been isolated and fully characterized. A related compound, xenon fluoride nitrate, has been made and is stable enough to be studied in more detail.

== Production ==
Attempted production has used the following reaction:

XeF_{2} + 2 HNO_{3} → Xe(NO_{3})_{2} + 2 HF

This reaction makes a red-brown solid. However, it decomposes spontaneously at 23 °C, turning blue temporarily while doing so:

Xe(NO_{3})_{2} → Xe + O_{2}NOONO_{2} (an unstable nitrogen peroxide)
