= Thionyl tetrafluoride =

- Structure of thionyl tetrafluoride

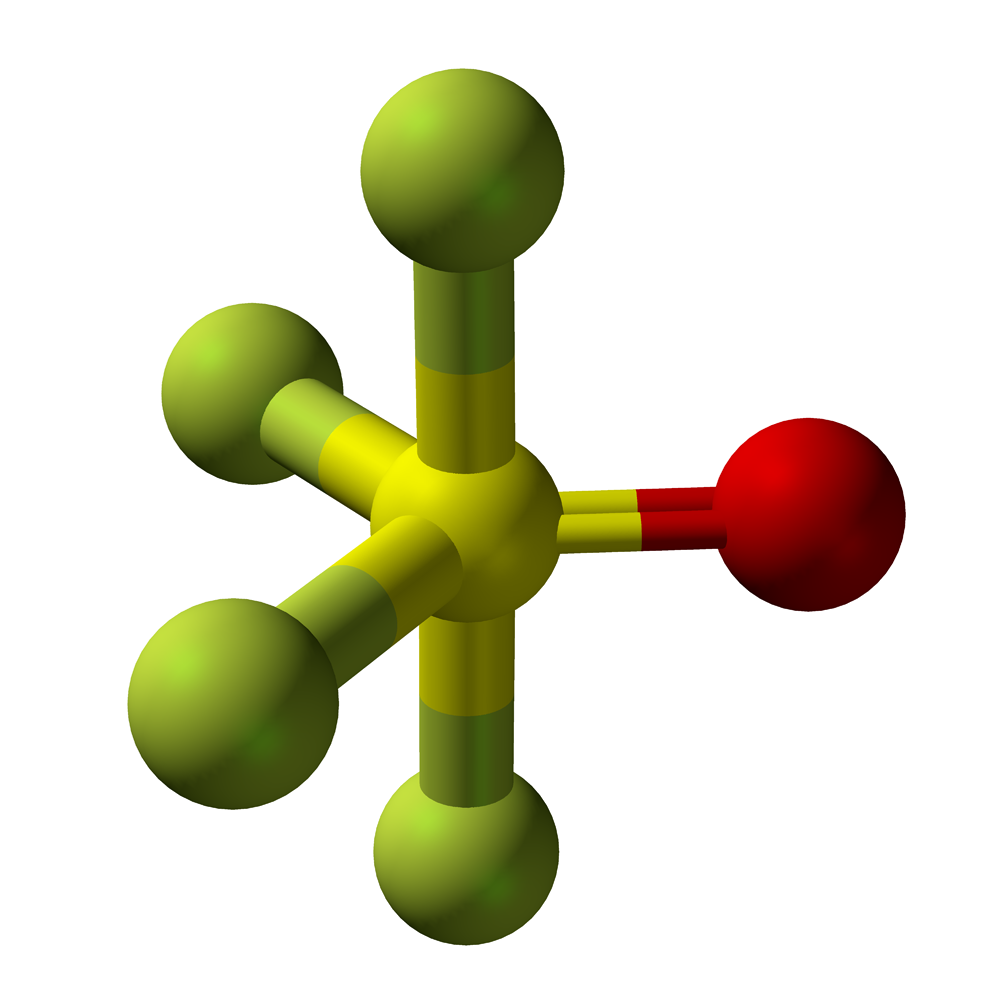
Ball-and-stick model of thionyl tetrafluoride
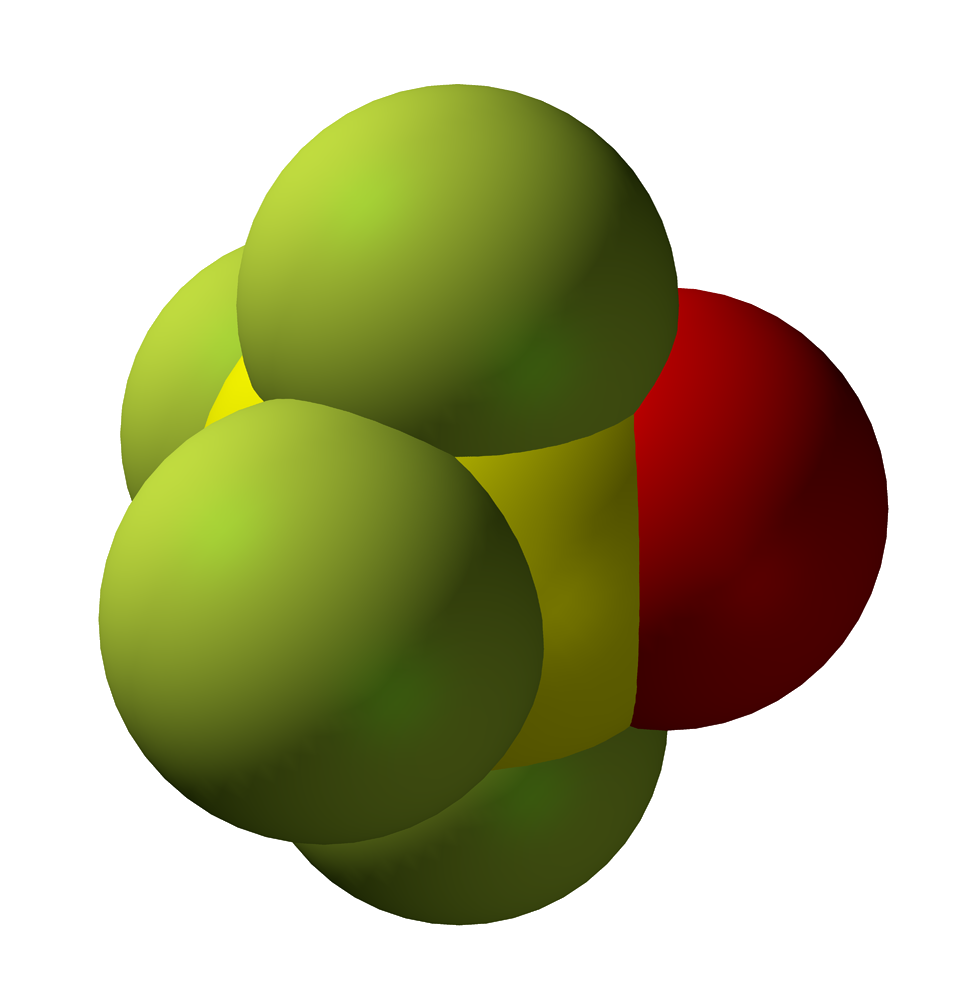
Space-filling model of thionyl tetrafluoride

Names
- IUPAC name Thionyl tetrafluoride

Identifiers
CAS Number	13709-54-1
3D model (JSmol)	Interactive image
ChemSpider	123077
PubChem CID	139557
CompTox Dashboard (EPA)	DTXSID30160060
- InChI: InChI=1S/F4OS/c1-6(2,3,4)5 Key: DUGWRBKBGKTKOX-UHFFFAOYSA-N
- SMILES: O=S(F)(F)(F)F

Properties
Chemical formula	SOF_{4}
Molar mass	124.05 g·mol^{−1}
Appearance	colorless gas
Density	1.653−0.0036T (°C) liquid
Melting point	−99.6 °C (−147.3 °F; 173.6 K)
Boiling point	−49 °C (−56 °F; 224 K) 5090 cal/mol heat of vapourisation
Solubility in water	reaction in water
log P	7.2349−859.58/T−26275/T²

Structure
Molecular shape	distorted trigonal bipyramid

Hazards
- GHS labelling
Pictograms	(GHS05: Corrosive) (GHS06: Toxic)
Signal word	Danger
Hazard statements	H300, H310, H314, H330
Precautionary statements	P260, P262, P264, P270, P271, P280, P284, P301+P310, P301+P330+P331, P302+P350, P303+P361+P353, P304+P340, P305+P351+P338, P310, P320, P321, P330, P361, P363, P403+P233, P405, P501

Related compounds
Related oxohalides	Thionyl fluoride; Selenyl tetrafluoride
Related compounds	Phosphoryl trifluoride; Pentafluorosulfur hypofluorite; Sulfuryl fluoride; Sulfur hexafluoride; Thiazyl trifluoride; Chromium oxytetrafluoride
- Except where otherwise noted, data are given for materials in their standard state (at 25 °C [77 °F], 100 kPa). verify (what is ?) Infobox references

Thionyl tetrafluoride, also known as sulfur tetrafluoride oxide, is an inorganic compound with the formula SOF_{4}. It is a colorless gas.

The shape of the molecule is a distorted trigonal bipyramid, with the oxygen found on the equator. The atoms on the equator have shorter bond lengths than the fluorine atoms on the axis. In the gas-phase, the sulfur-oxygen bond is 1.409 Å. The S−F bond on the axis has length 1.596 Å and the S−F bond on the equator has length 1.539 Å. The angle between the equatorial fluorine atoms is 112.8°. The angle between axial fluorine and oxygen is 97.7°. The angle between oxygen and equatorial fluorine is 123.6° and between axial and equatorial fluorine is 85.7°. Slight variations of bonds lengths and angles has been observed in solid-state by X-ray analysis. The fluorine atoms only produce one NMR line, probably because they exchange positions. It is isoelectronic with phosphorus pentafluoride.

== Formation ==
Thionyl fluoride reacting with fluorine gas can produce thionyl tetrafluoride. This was how the gas was first discovered by Moissan and Lebeau in 1902. They identified the formula by the pressure changes resulting from the reaction. Silver fluoride and platinum are capable of catalyzing the reaction.

It can also be formed from the reaction of silver difluoride with thionyl fluoride at 392 °F (200 °C), or by electrolyzing hydrogen fluoride with a solution of sulfur dioxide, which also made oxygen difluoride and sulfuryl fluoride. Thionyl chloride or thionyl fluoride electrolyzed with hydrogen fluoride produced even more of the gas.

== Reactions ==
Thionyl tetrafluoride reacts with water to make hydrofluoric acid, sulfurofluoridic acid, and sulfuryl difluoride. Mercury can strip off fluoride to make thionyl fluoride and mercurous fluoride. Strong bases result in formation of fluoride and fluorosulfate ions.

Reactions with the strong Lewis acids, such as AsF_{5} and SbF_{5}, result in the formation of trifluorosulfoxonium cation [SOF_{3}]^{+} and the corresponding salts [SOF_{3}]^{+}[AsF_{6}]^{−} (trifluorosulfoxonium hexafluoroarsenate(V)) and [SOF_{3}]^{+}[SbF_{6}]^{−} (trifluorosulfoxonium hexafluoroantimonate(V)), respectively.

=== Click chemistry ===
Thionyl tetrafluoride can be used in click chemistry through reactions with primary amines known as sulfur(VI) fluoride exchange (SuFEx). This kind of reaction was the first "click" reaction to generate a three-dimensional core.

Reactions with amines will lead to the corresponding sulfurimidoyl difluoride, which has been used in multiple high throughput screening efforts to discover new inhibitors or molecular glue degraders.
