= Disulfuryl chloride =

Names
- Other names: Pyrosulfuryl chloride; Disulfur pentoxydichloride; Sulfur pentoxydichloride

Identifiers
CAS Number	7791-27-7
3D model (JSmol)	Interactive image
ChemSpider	23051
PubChem CID	24649
UNII	DKB8YHP7JA
UN number	1817 (PYROSULFURYL CHLORIDE)
CompTox Dashboard (EPA)	DTXSID90999111
- InChI: InChI=1S/Cl2O5S2/c1-8(3,4)7-9(2,5)6 Key: NNTJKSMVNWGFTB-UHFFFAOYSA-N
- SMILES: O=S(=O)(OS(=O)(=O)Cl)Cl

Properties
Chemical formula	Cl_{2}O_{5}S_{2}
Molar mass	215.02 g·mol^{−1}
Appearance	colorless liquid
Density	1.84 g/cm^{3}
Melting point	–37 °C
Boiling point	152.5 °C
Solubility in water	reacts with water
- Except where otherwise noted, data are given for materials in their standard state (at 25 °C [77 °F], 100 kPa). Infobox references

Disulfuryl chloride is an inorganic compound of sulfur, chlorine, and oxygen with the chemical formula S_{2}O_{5}Cl_{2}. This is the anhydride of chlorosulfuric acid.

== Synthesis ==
Careful heating of sulfur trioxide and carbon tetrachloride:

2SO_{3} + CCl_{4} → S_{2}O_{5}Cl_{2} + COCl_{2}

There are also other known methods that do not produce phosgene as a by-product, for example mixing sulfur trioxide and sulfuryl chloride:

SO_{3} + SO_{2}Cl_{2} → S_{2}O_{5}Cl_{2}

== Physical properties ==
The compound appears as a dense, very refractive, colorless liquid with a pungent odor, insoluble in cold water, and prone to hydrolysis. Its tendency to smoke in air is low when the compound is pure, while the smoke increases with the presence of chlorosulfuric acid impurities, which are more prone to hydrolysis.

== Chemical properties ==
It slowly hydrolyzes on contact with water:

S_{2}O_{5}Cl_{2} + 3H_{2}O → 2H_{2}SO_{4} + 2HCl↑

Prolonged boiling or heating to 250 °C (482 °F) results in dissociation into sulfur trioxide, sulfur dioxide, and chlorine.

== Uses ==
The compound is used in organic synthesis and as a chlorinating agent.

== See also ==
- Disulfuryl fluoride
- Disulfuryl chloride fluoride
- Peroxydisulfuryl difluoride
- Trisulfuryl chloride
