= Disulfuryl fluoride =

Names
- Other names Pyrosulfuryl fluoride

Identifiers
CAS Number	13036-75-4
3D model (JSmol)	Interactive image
ChemSpider	74939
ECHA InfoCard	100.032.624
EC Number	235-903-0
PubChem CID	83067
CompTox Dashboard (EPA)	DTXSID7065332
- InChI: InChI=1S/F2O5S2/c1-8(3,4)7-9(2,5)6 Key: WICQXESQFGXSKV-UHFFFAOYSA-N
- SMILES: O=S(=O)(OS(=O)(=O)F)F

Properties
Chemical formula	F_{2}O_{5}S_{2}
Molar mass	182.11 g·mol^{−1}
Appearance	colorless liquid
Density	1.75 g/cm^{3}
Melting point	–48 °C
Boiling point	50.8 °C
Solubility in water	reacts with water
- Except where otherwise noted, data are given for materials in their standard state (at 25 °C [77 °F], 100 kPa). Infobox references

Disulfuryl fluoride is an inorganic compound of sulfur, fluorine, and oxygen with the chemical formula S_{2}O_{5}F_{2}. This is the anhydride of fluorosulfuric acid.

== Synthesis ==
Autoclave heating of sulfur trioxide and calcium fluoride:

3SO_{3} + CaF_{2} → S_{2}O_{5}F_{2} + CaSO_{4}

The compound can be produced by the reaction of SSF_{2} and FOSO_{2}F in deuterated chloroform at −100 °C:

2SSF_{2} + 4FOSO_{2}F → 2S_{2}O_{5}F_{2} + 2SOF_{2} + SF_{4} + 1/_{8}S_{8}

It can also be produced in the reaction of iodine pentafluoride and sulfur trioxide.

Other methods are also known.

== Physical properties ==
Pyrosulfuryl difluoride forms a colorless liquid that smokes slightly in the air. It causes severe suffocation and resembles phosgene in its action.

== Chemical properties ==
When heated, the compound is stable to a temperature of 200 °C.

It is slowly hydrolyzed by water:

S_{2}O_{5}F_{2} + H_{2}O → 2HSO_{3}F

It reacts with tetraethyl titanate to produce diethoxytitanium difluorosulfonate:

Ti(OC_{2}H_{5})_{4} + 2S_{2}O_{5}F_{2} → Ti(OC_{2}H_{5})_{2}(O_{3}SF)_{2} + 2C_{2}H_{5}OSO_{2}F

== See also ==
- Sulfuryl fluoride
- Disulfuryl chloride
- Disulfuryl chloride fluoride
- Trisulfuryl fluoride
- Peroxydisulfuryl difluoride
