= Sulfuryl chloride fluoride =

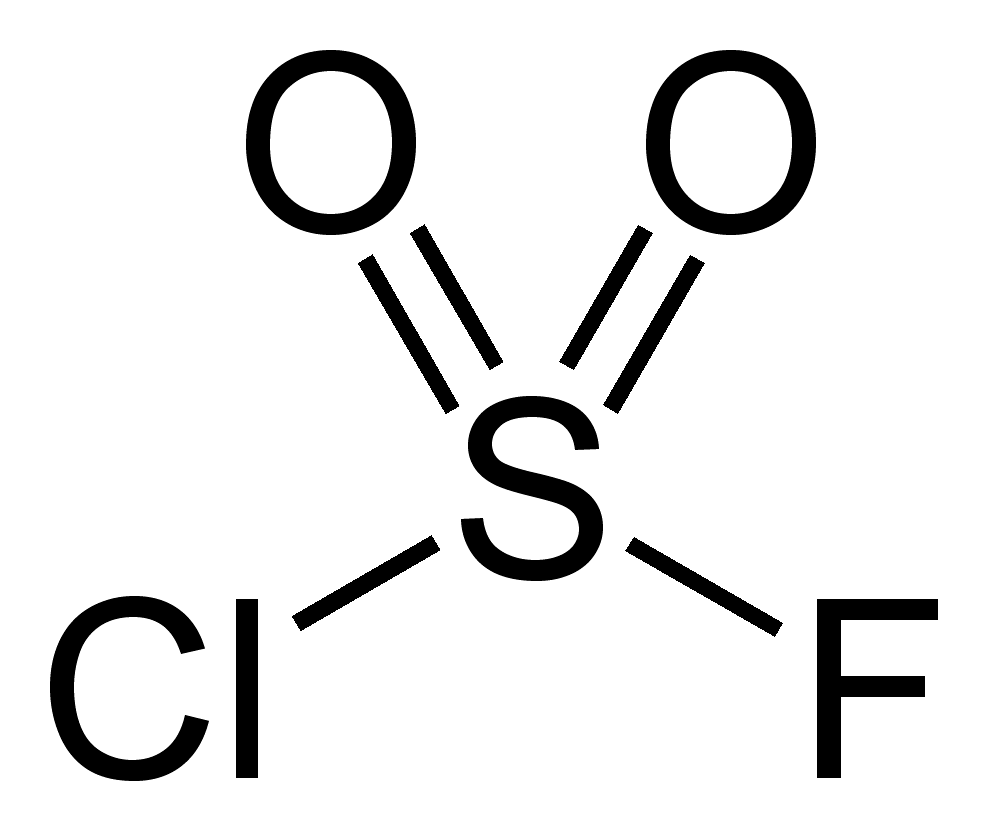
- Structure of sulfuryl chloride fluoride

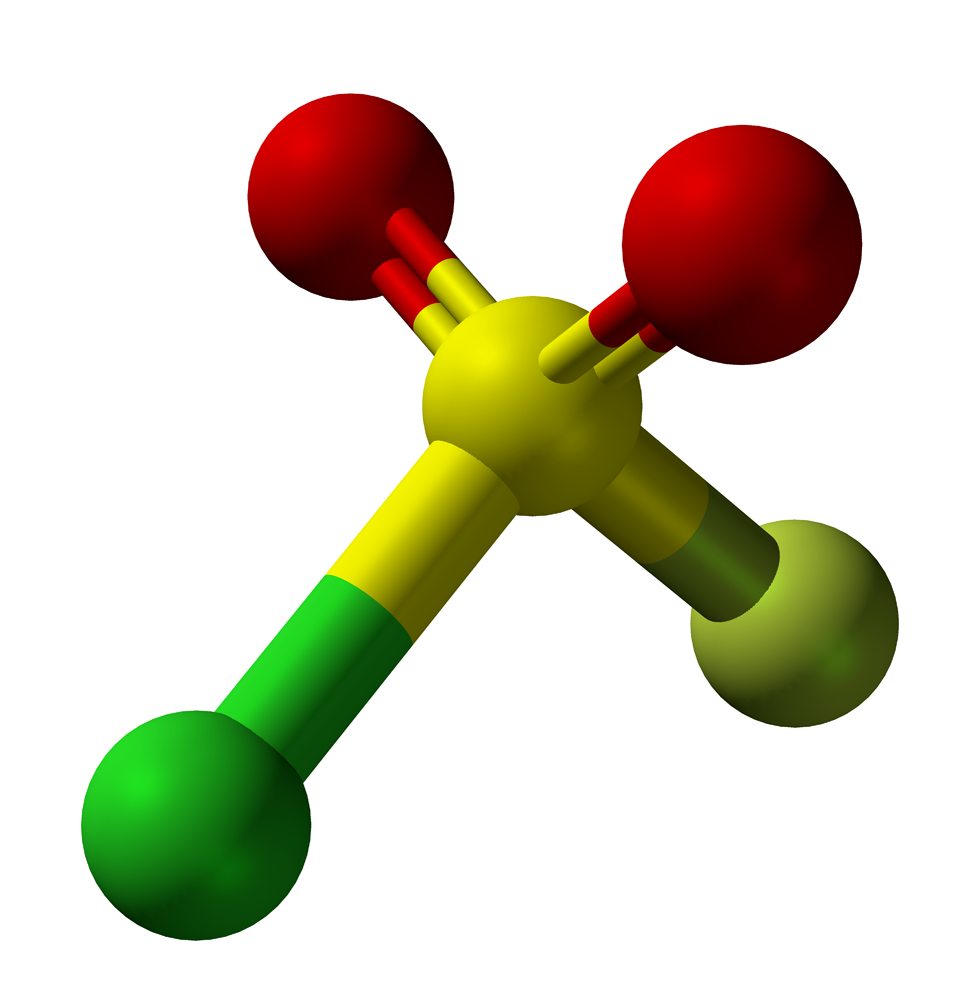

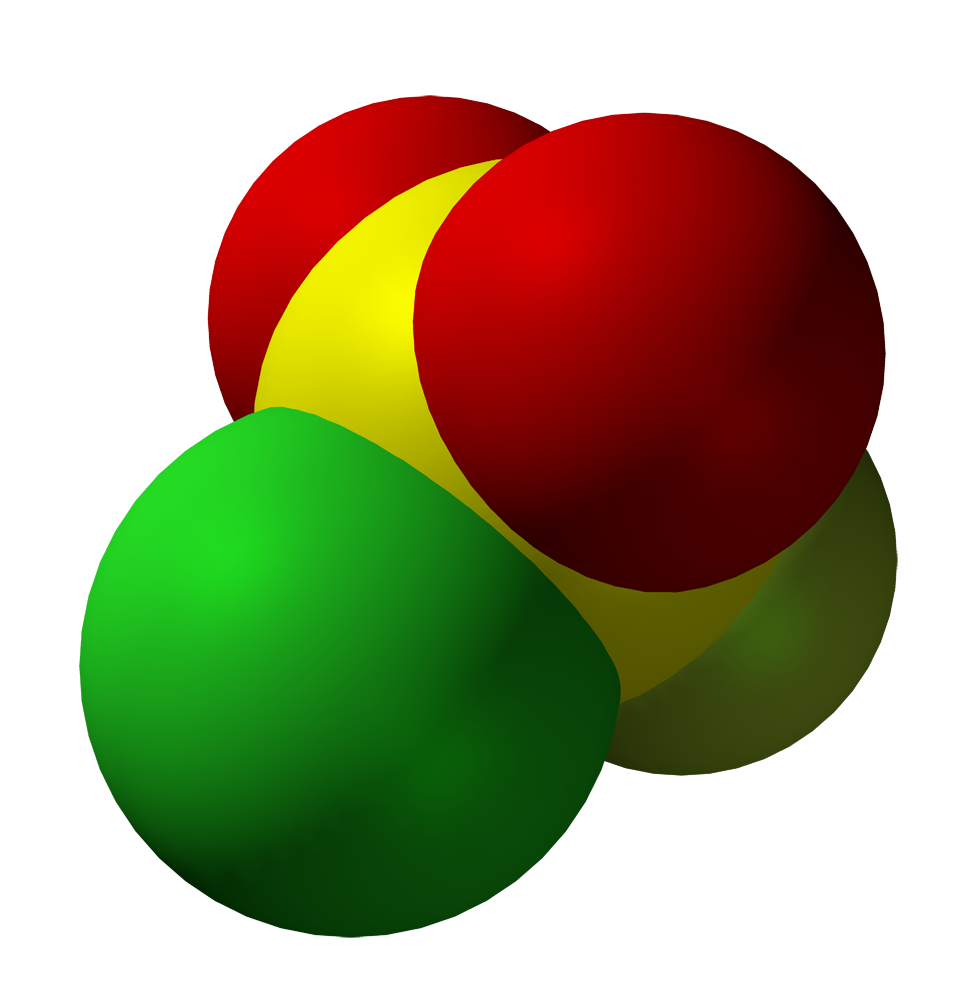

Names
- IUPAC name Sulfuryl chloride fluoride
- Other names Sulfuryl fluoride chloride, TL-212

Identifiers
CAS Number	13637-84-8
3D model (JSmol)	Interactive image
ChEBI	CHEBI:39445
ChemSpider	24370
ECHA InfoCard	100.033.737
EC Number	237-126-2
Gmelin Reference	1993
PubChem CID	26159
RTECS number	WT4900000
UNII	Y7TT1LZ9SD
CompTox Dashboard (EPA)	DTXSID0065567
- InChI: InChI=1S/ClFO2S/c1-5(2,3)4 Key: IXPAAHZTOUOJJM-UHFFFAOYSA-N; InChI=1/ClFO2S/c1-5(2,3)4 Key: IXPAAHZTOUOJJM-UHFFFAOYAK
- SMILES: ClS(F)(=O)=O

Properties
Chemical formula	SO_{2}ClF
Molar mass	118.52 g/mol
Appearance	colourless gas
Density	1.623 g/cm^{3} at 0 °C
Melting point	−124.7 °C (−192.5 °F; 148.5 K)
Boiling point	7.1 °C (44.8 °F; 280.2 K)
Solubility in water	hydrolyses
Solubility in other solvents	SO_{2} and ether

Structure
Coordination geometry	tetrahedral

Hazards
- Occupational safety and health (OHS/OSH)
Main hazards	moderately toxic, corrosive
- GHS labelling
Pictograms	(GHS05: Corrosive) (GHS06: Toxic)
Signal word	Danger
Hazard statements	H301, H311, H314, H331
Precautionary statements	P260, P264, P270, P271, P280, P301+P310, P301+P330+P331, P302+P352, P303+P361+P353, P304+P340, P305+P351+P338, P310, P311, P312, P321, P322, P330, P361, P363, P403+P233, P405, P501
Safety data sheet (SDS)	"External MSDS"

Related compounds
Related compounds	SO_{2}Cl_{2}; SO_{2}F_{2}; ClSO_{2}(NCO); SO_{2}BrF; S_{2}O_{5}ClF
- Except where otherwise noted, data are given for materials in their standard state (at 25 °C [77 °F], 100 kPa). verify (what is ?) Infobox references

Sulfuryl chloride fluoride is a chemical compound with the formula SO_{2}ClF. It is a colorless, easily condensed gas. It is a tetrahedral molecule.

Liquified sulfuryl chloride fluoride is employed as a solvent for highly oxidizing compounds.

== Preparation ==
The laboratory-scale synthesis begins with the preparation of potassium fluorosulfite:

SO_{2} + KF → KSO_{2}F

This salt is then chlorinated to give sulfuryl chloride fluoride

KSO_{2}F + Cl_{2} → SO_{2}ClF + KCl

Further heating (180 °C) of potassium fluorosulfite with the sulfuryl chloride fluoride gives sulfuryl fluoride.

KSO_{2}F + SO_{2}ClF → SO_{2}F_{2} + KCl + SO_{2}

Alternatively, sulfuryl chloride fluoride can be prepared without using gases as starting materials by treating sulfuryl chloride with ammonium fluoride or potassium fluoride in trifluoroacetic acid.

SO_{2}Cl_{2} + NH_{4}F → SO_{2}ClF + NH_{4}Cl
