= Chlorine fluorosulfate =

Identifiers
CAS Number	13997-90-5
3D model (JSmol)	Interactive image
ChemSpider	10329053
PubChem CID	12521007
- InChI: InChI=1S/ClFO3S/c1-5-6(2,3)4 Key: WDQSSBOCSOSRIZ-UHFFFAOYSA-N
- SMILES: ClOS(=O)(=O)F

Properties
Chemical formula	ClFO_{3}S
Molar mass	134.51 g·mol^{−1}
Appearance	Light yellow liquid
Density	1.71 g/cm³
Melting point	−84.3 °C
Boiling point	43.4 °C
Solubility in water	reacts with water
- Except where otherwise noted, data are given for materials in their standard state (at 25 °C [77 °F], 100 kPa). Infobox references

Chlorine fluorosulfate is an inorganic compound with the chemical formula ClFO_{3}S. This is a derivative of fluorosulfonic acid.

== Synthesis ==
Chlorine fluorosulfonate can be prepared by reacting sulfur trioxide and chlorine monofluoride at low temperatures:

SO_{3} + ClF → ClOSO_{2}F

The compound can also be prepared by reacting sulfonyl fluoride peroxide with chlorine at 125 °C under high pressure:

Cl_{2} + S_{2}O_{6}F_{2} → 2ClOSO_{2}F

== Physical properties ==
The compound is a highly reactive, and forms a pale yellow liquid that reacts violently with water. The compound decomposes upon warming to room temperature, turning red.

== Chemical properties ==
Chlorine trifluoride oxide reacts with chlorine fluorosulfate:

ClOF_{3} + 2ClOSO_{2}F → S_{2}O_{5}F_{2} + FClO_{2} + 2ClF

The reaction also produces SO_{2}F_{2}.

The compound also reacts with nitronium perchlorate to produce chlorine perchlorate:

2ClOSO_{2}F + NO_{2}ClO_{4} → ClClO_{4} + NO_{2}SO_{3}F

== Uses ==
The compound is used as a chlorinating agent, fluorosulfating agent, and oxidizer.

== See also ==
- Bromine fluorosulfate
- Fluorine fluorosulfate
- Iodine fluorosulfate
- Triiodine fluorosulfate
