= Fluorosulfonate =

- Fluorosulfate ion

Identifiers
CAS Number	(ion): 15181-47-2
3D model (JSmol)	(ion): Interactive image
ChemSpider	(ion): 2657785
PubChem CID	(ion): 3413884
CompTox Dashboard (EPA)	(ion): DTXSID80392253
- InChI: (ion): InChI=1S/FHO3S/c1-5(2,3)4/h(H,2,3,4)/p-1 Key: UQSQSQZYBQSBJZ-UHFFFAOYSA-M
- SMILES: (ion): [O-]S(=O)(=O)F

Properties
Chemical formula	FO_{3}S^{−}
Molar mass	99.06 g·mol^{−1}

Related compounds
Other anions	Chlorosulfate
Related compounds	Fluorine fluorosulfonate, Sulfuryl fluoride, Trifluorosulfate
- Except where otherwise noted, data are given for materials in their standard state (at 25 °C [77 °F], 100 kPa). Infobox references

Fluorosulfonate, in organic chemistry, is a functional group that has the chemical formula F-SO_{2}-R, and typically is a very good leaving group. In organic chemistry, fluorosulfonate is different than fluorosulfate. In fluorosulfonates, sulfur atom is directly bonded to a non-oxygen atom such as carbon. In inorganic chemistry, fluorosulfonate is another term for fluorosulfate, the anion F-SO_{2}-O^{−}, the conjugate base of fluorosulfonic acid. They form a series of salts with metal and organic cations called fluorosulfates.

Organic (alkyl) fluorosulfonates are usually strong alkylation agents, similar to triflate esters (F_{3}C-SO_{2}-OR). But unlike the triflate group, the fluorosulfonate group is not stable against hydrolysis. Therefore, fluorosulfonate esters are less frequently used as alkylation agents than triflate esters.

General chemical structure of a fluorosulfate ester. In Fluorosulfonates, sulfur atom is directly bonded to a non-oxygen atom such as carbon.

== See also ==
- Bromine(III) fluorosulfonate
- Chlorine fluorosulfate
- Fluorosulfite
- Methyl fluorosulfonate
