= Xenon fluoride nitrate =

Identifiers
CAS Number	128970-72-9
3D model (JSmol)	Interactive image
- InChI: InChI=1S/FNO3Xe/c1-6-5-2(3)4 Key: YCLGDVQFVLWCLS-UHFFFAOYSA-N
- SMILES: [O-][N+](=O)O[Xe]F

Properties
Chemical formula	FNO_{3}Xe
Molar mass	212.295 g·mol^{−1}
- Except where otherwise noted, data are given for materials in their standard state (at 25 °C [77 °F], 100 kPa). Infobox references

Xenon fluoride nitrate, also known as fluoroxenonium nitrate, is the chemical compound with formula FXeONO_{2}.

== Synthesis ==
This compound is formed via the reaction:

[FXeOXeFXeF][AsF_{6}] + 2NO_{2}F → FXeONO_{2} + NO_{2}AsF_{6}.

Purification of FXeONO_{2} can then take place by dissolving in SO_{2}ClF, which leaves the nitronium arsenic hexafluoride behind as a solid.

An alternate low yield method to make FXeONO_{2} is to dissolve xenon difluoride in liquid dinitrogen tetroxide at 0 °C.

XeF_{2} + NO^{+} + NO_{3}^{−} → FXeONO_{2} + NOF

This method is inefficient as not much nitrate ion exists in the liquid and the xenon fluoride nitrate decomposes.

Another method claimed to make this substance is:

XeF_{2} + HNO_{3} → FXeONO_{2} + HF

== Properties ==
FXeONO_{2} is a white crystalline material. The space group of the crystals is P2_{1}/c, which is monoclinic. The unit cell contains four molecules with a total volume of 386.6 Å^{3}. The unit cell dimensions are a = 4.6663 Å, b = 8.799 Å c = 9.415 Å, with non-perpendicular angle β = 90.325°. With a molecular weight of 212.3, the crystal has density 3.648. (These measurements at −173 °C.)

The bond lengths in the molecule are 1.992 Å for Xe–F, 2.126 Å for Xe–O, 1.36 Å for O–NO_{2}, 1.199 for N–O_{cis} and 1.224 Å for N–O_{trans}. The bond angles are 177.6° for F–Xe–O, 114.7° for Xe-O-N, 114.5° for (Xe)O–N–O_{cis}, 118.4° for (Xe)O–N–O_{trans} and 127.1° for O_{cis}–N–O_{trans}. The bond lengths and angles on the xenon atom are similar to that in FXeOSO_{2}F and FXeOTeF_{5}, indicating a polar oxygen bond. The Xe–O–N angle is larger than those in halogen nitrates, which indicates a lower bond density for the Xe–O bond. The N–O_{cis} bond length is longer than the N–O_{trans} bond length, opposite to other halogen nitrates.

FXeONO_{2} is not particularly stable and slowly breaks down at −78 °C, yielding XeF_{2}·N_{2}O_{4}. This happens on a timescale of several days. At 0 °C, FXeONO_{2} has a half life of seven hours, decomposing to XeF_{2}.
