= Chlorosulfuric acid =

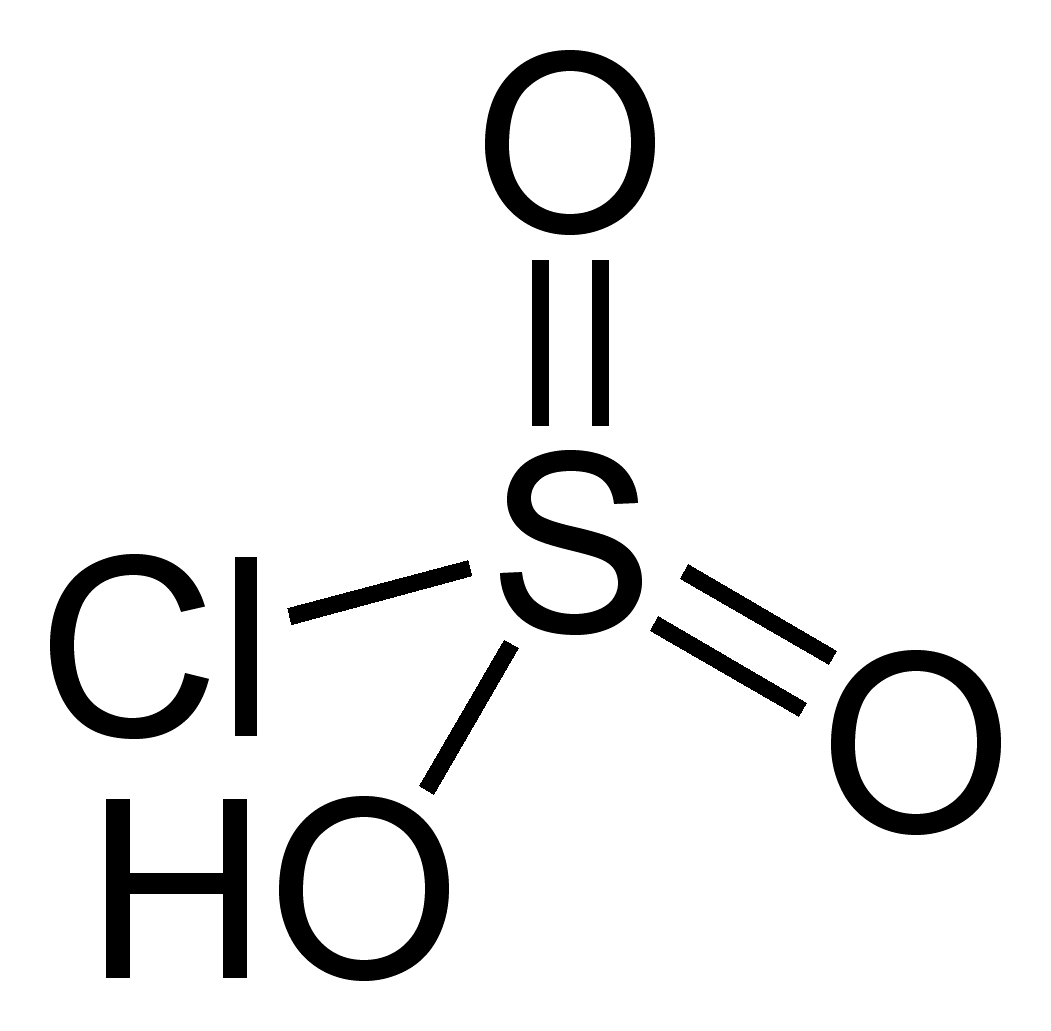

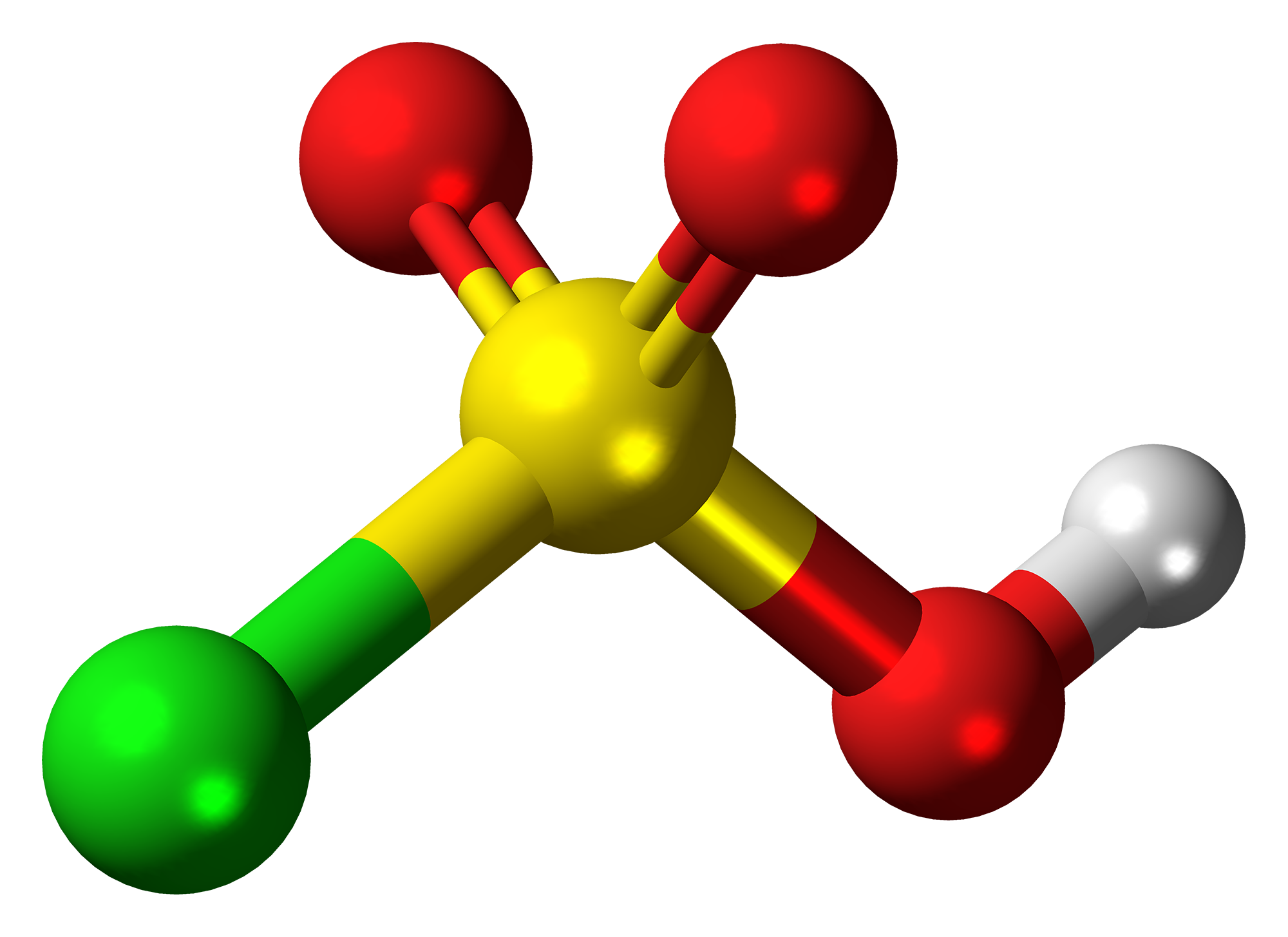

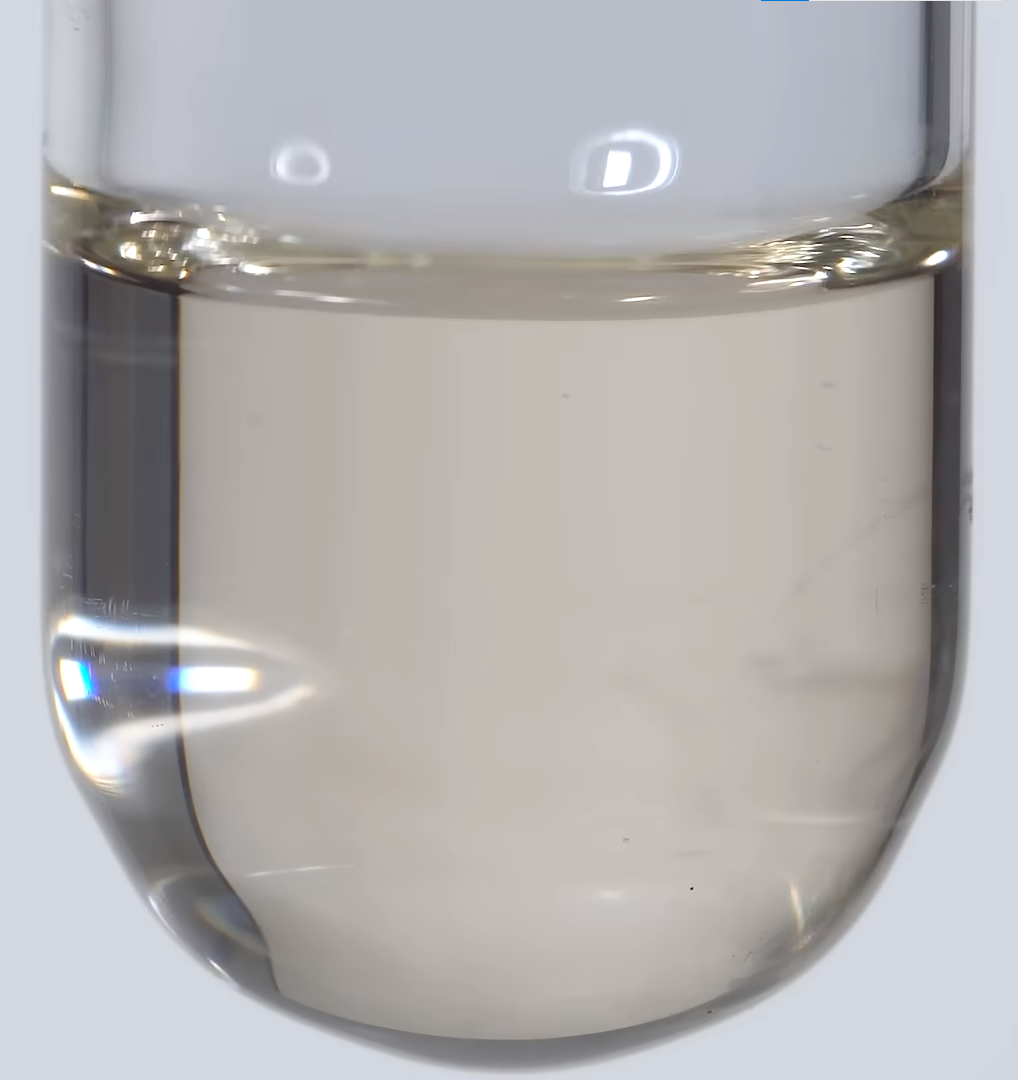

Names
- IUPAC name Sulfurochloridic acid
- Other names Chlorosulfuric acid, Chlorosulfonic acid, Chlorosulphonic acid, Chlorinesulfonic acid, Chlorinesulphonic acid, Chloridosulfonic acid, Chloridosulphonic acid, Sulfuric chlorohydrin

Identifiers
CAS Number	7790-94-5
3D model (JSmol)	Interactive image
ChemSpider	23040
ECHA InfoCard	100.029.304
EC Number	232-234-6
PubChem CID	24638
RTECS number	FX5730000
UNII	2O9AXL1TJ4
UN number	1754
CompTox Dashboard (EPA)	DTXSID1029706
- InChI: InChI=1S/ClHO3S/c1-5(2,3)4/h(H,2,3,4) Key: XTHPWXDJESJLNJ-UHFFFAOYSA-N; InChI=1/ClHO3S/c1-5(2,3)4/h(H,2,3,4) Key: XTHPWXDJESJLNJ-UHFFFAOYAO
- SMILES: ClS(=O)(=O)O

Properties
Chemical formula	HSO_{3}Cl
Molar mass	116.52 g mol^{−1}
Appearance	colorless liquid, but commercial samples usually are pale brown
Density	1.753 g cm^{−3}
Melting point	−80 °C (−112 °F; 193 K)
Boiling point	151 to 152 °C (304 to 306 °F; 424 to 425 K) (755 mmHg or 100.7 kPa)
Solubility in water	hydrolysis
Solubility in other solvents	reacts with alcohols soluble in chlorocarbons
Acidity (pK_{a})	−5.9 (in CF_{3}CO_{2}H)
Refractive index (n_{D})	1.433

Structure
Molecular shape	tetrahedral

Hazards
- GHS labelling
Pictograms	(GHS05: Corrosive) (GHS07: Exclamation mark)
Signal word	Danger
Hazard statements	H314, H335
Precautionary statements	P260, P264, P271, P280, P301+P330+P331, P303+P361+P353, P304+P340, P305+P351+P338, P310, P312, P321, P363, P403+P233, P405, P501
NFPA 704 (fire diamond)	3 0 2 W; OX
Safety data sheet (SDS)	ICSC 1039

Related compounds
Related compounds	Sulfuryl chloride Sulfuric acid Fluorosulfuric acid Trichloromethanesulfonic acid
- Except where otherwise noted, data are given for materials in their standard state (at 25 °C [77 °F], 100 kPa). verify (what is ?) Infobox references

Chlorosulfuric acid (IUPAC name: sulfurochloridic acid) is the inorganic compound with the formula HSO_{3}Cl. It is also known as chlorosulfonic acid, being the sulfonic acid of chlorine. It is a distillable, colorless liquid which is hygroscopic and a powerful lachrymator. Commercial samples usually are pale brown or straw colored.

Salts and esters of chlorosulfuric acid are known as chlorosulfates.

== Structure and properties ==
Chlorosulfuric acid is a tetrahedral molecule. Its structure was debated for many decades until in 1941 Shrinivasa Dharmatti proved by magnetic susceptibility that chlorine is directly bonded to sulfur.

The formula is more descriptively written SO_{2}(OH)Cl, but HSO_{3}Cl is traditional. It is an intermediate, chemically and conceptually, between sulfuryl chloride (SO_{2}Cl_{2}) and sulfuric acid (H_{2}SO_{4}). The compound is rarely obtained pure. Upon standing with excess sulfur trioxide, it decomposes to pyrosulfuryl chlorides:

2 ClSO_{3}H + SO_{3} → H_{2}SO_{4} + S_{2}O_{5}Cl_{2}

== Synthesis ==
The industrial synthesis entails the reaction of hydrogen chloride with a solution of sulfur trioxide in sulfuric acid:

HCl + SO_{3} → ClSO_{3}H

It can also be prepared by the method originally used by acid's discoverer Alexander William Williamson in 1854, namely chlorination of sulfuric acid, written here for pedagogical purposes as HSO_{3}(OH) vs. the usual format H_{2}SO_{4}:

PCl_{5} + HSO_{3}(OH) → HSO_{3}Cl + POCl_{3} + HCl

The latter method is more suited for laboratory-scale operations.

Williamson's discovery disproved then-popular hypothesis that sulfuric acid is a compound of water (which was incorrectly assumed to have formula of HO) and sulfur trioxide.

== Applications ==
ClSO_{2}OH is used to prepare alkyl sulfates, which are useful as detergents and as chemical intermediates:

ROH + ClSO_{3}H → ROSO_{3}H + HCl

One historical synthesis of saccharin begins with the reaction of toluene with ClSO_{2}OH to give the ortho- and para-toluenesulfonyl chloride derivatives:

CH_{3}C_{6}H_{5} + 2 ClSO_{2}OH → CH_{3}C_{6}H_{4}SO_{2}Cl + H_{2}SO_{4} + HCl

Oxidation of the ortho isomer gives the benzoic acid derivative that then is cyclized with ammonia and neutralized with base to afford saccharin.

Chlorosulfonic acid has been used as an anti-contrail agent in Ryan Model 147 reconnaissance drones, and to produce smoke screens.

== Safety ==
ClSO_{3}H reacts violently with water to yield sulfuric acid and hydrogen chloride, which are corrosive:

ClSO_{3}H + H_{2}O → H_{2}SO_{4} + HCl

== Related halosulfuric acids ==
- Fluorosulfonic acid, FSO_{2}OH, is a related strong acid with a diminished tendency to hydrolyze to corresponding hydrogen halide compared to chlorosulfuric acid.
- Bromosulfonic acid, BrSO_{2}OH, unstable substance decomposing at its melting point of 8 °C to give bromine, sulfur dioxide, and sulfuric acid.
- Iodosulfonic acid, not successfully synthesised as of 2026
