= Trifluorosulfate =

Trifluorosulfate is an ion with the formula SO_{2}F_{3}^{−}. This term is ambiguous with three fluorosulfate ions (SO_{3}F)_{3}. It can also be confused with the trifluoromethyl sulfate ion.

== Properties ==
Chemical structure of the trifluorosulfate anion

The trifluorosulfate ion has a distorted trigonal bipyramid shape with C_{2v} symmetry. On the equator are two oxygen atoms with a bond to sulfur of length 143.2 pm. Also one fluorine atom on the equator has a bond length of 157.9 pm. The two other fluorine atoms at the apexes of the pyramids have bond lengths 168.5 pm and form an angle ∠FSF of 165.2°.

== List ==
name	formula	weight	system	space group	unit cell	volume	density	properties	ref
tetramethylammonium trifluorosulfate	[(CH_{3})_{4}N][SO_{2}F_{3}]							colourless	
