= Sulfuryl chloride =

Chemical compound

- Structure and dimensions of sulfuryl chloride

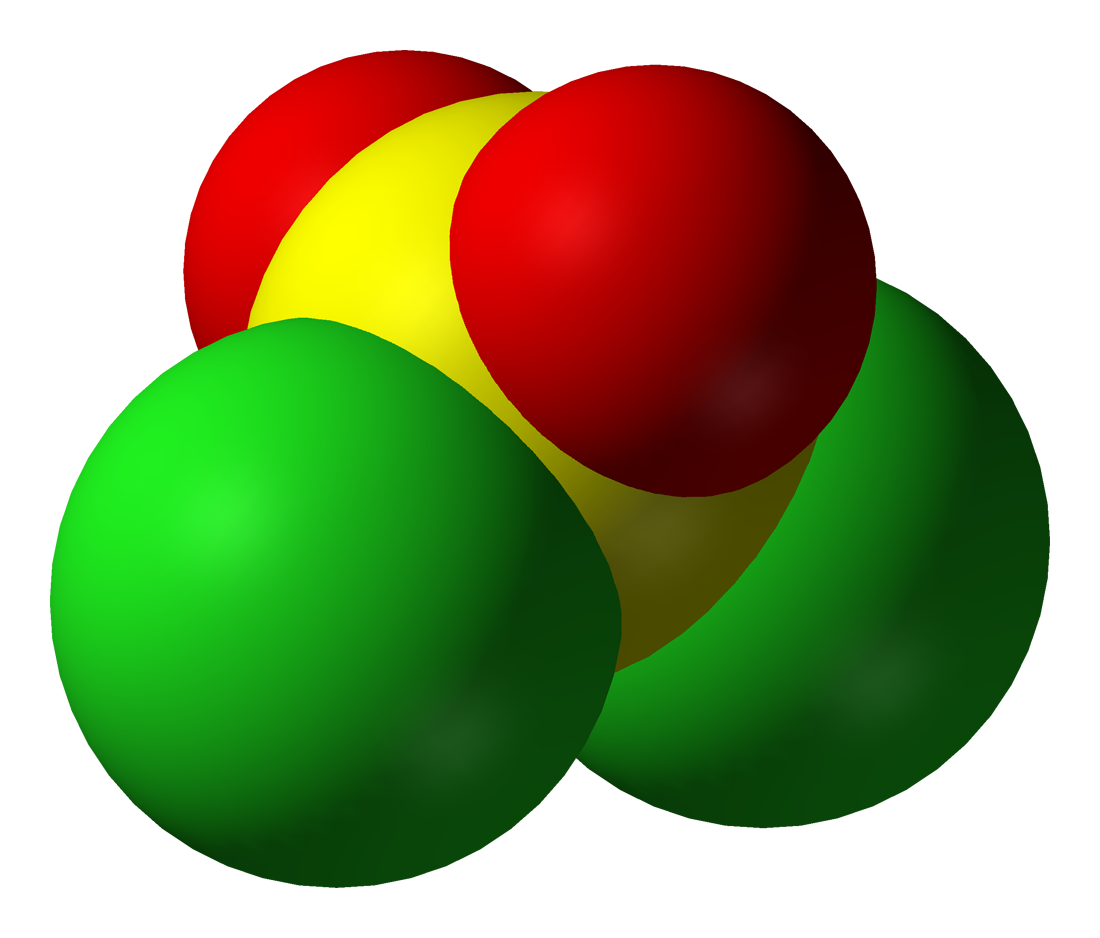
- Ball-and-stick model of sulfuryl chloride

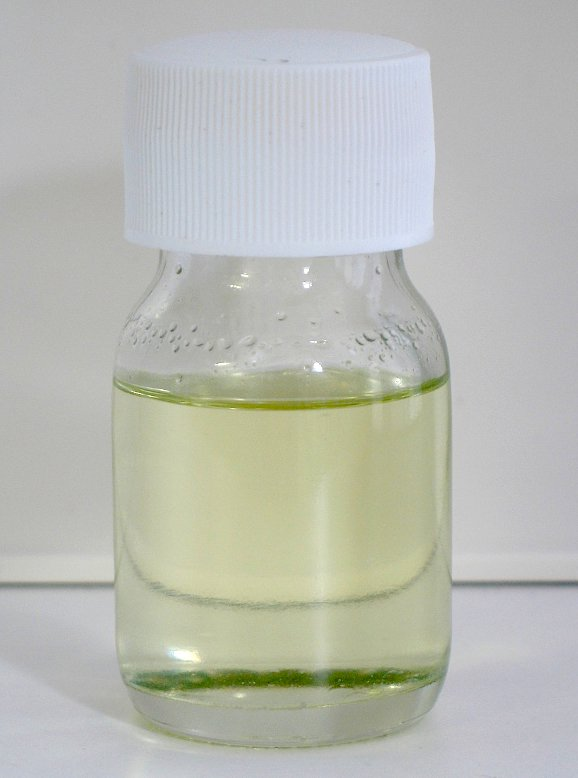

Names
- IUPAC name Sulfuryl chloride
- Other names Sulfonyl chloride Sulfuric chloride Sulfur dichloride dioxide

Identifiers
| CAS Number | 7791-25-5 |
| 3D model (JSmol) | Interactive image |
| ChEBI | CHEBI:29291 |
| ChEMBL | ChEMBL3186735 |
| ChemSpider | 23050 |
| ECHA InfoCard | 100.029.314 |
| EC Number | 232-245-6 |
| Gmelin Reference | 2256 |
| PubChem CID | 24648 |
| RTECS number | WT4870000 |
| UNII | JD26K0R3J1 |
| UN number | 1834 |
| CompTox Dashboard (EPA) | DTXSID6029707 |
- InChI: InChI=1S/Cl2O2S/c1-5(2,3)4 Key: YBBRCQOCSYXUOC-UHFFFAOYSA-N; InChI=1/Cl2O2S/c1-5(2,3)4 Key: YBBRCQOCSYXUOC-UHFFFAOYAD
- SMILES: ClS(Cl)(=O)=O

Properties
| Chemical formula | SO_{2}Cl_{2} |
| Molar mass | 134.9698 g mol^{−1} |
| Appearance | Colorless liquid with a pungent odor. Yellows upon standing. |
| Density | 1.67 g cm^{−3} (20 °C) |
| Melting point | −54.1 °C (−65.4 °F; 219.1 K) |
| Boiling point | 69.4 °C (156.9 °F; 342.5 K) |
| Solubility in water | hydrolyzes |
| Solubility | miscible with benzene, toluene, chloroform, CCl_{4}, glacial acetic acid |
| Refractive index (n_{D}) | 1.4437 (20 °C) |

Hazards
- GHS labelling
| Pictograms | (GHS05: Corrosive) (GHS07: Exclamation mark) |
| Signal word | Danger |
| Hazard statements | H314, H335 |
| Precautionary statements | P260, P264, P271, P280, P301+P330+P331, P303+P361+P353, P304+P340, P305+P351+P338, P310, P312, P321, P363, P403+P233, P405, P501 |
| NFPA 704 (fire diamond) | 3 0 2 W |
| Flash point | Not flammable |

Related compounds
| Related sulfuryl halides | Sulfuryl fluoride |
| Related compounds | Thionyl chloride Chlorosulfonic acid Sulfuric acid Chromyl chloride |
- Except where otherwise noted, data are given for materials in their standard state (at 25 °C [77 °F], 100 kPa). verify (what is ?) Infobox references

Sulfuryl chloride is an inorganic compound with the formula SO_{2}Cl_{2}. At room temperature, it is a colorless liquid with a pungent odor. Sulfuryl chloride is not found in nature.

Sulfuryl chloride is commonly confused with thionyl chloride, SOCl_{2}. The properties of these two sulfur oxychlorides are quite different: sulfuryl chloride is a source of chlorine whereas thionyl chloride is a source of chloride ions. An alternative IUPAC name is sulfuryl dichloride.

Sulfur is tetrahedral in SO_{2}Cl_{2} and the oxidation state of the sulfur atom is +6, as in sulfuric acid.

== Synthesis ==
SO_{2}Cl_{2} is prepared by the reaction of sulfur dioxide and chlorine in the presence of a catalyst, such as activated carbon.

SO_{2} + Cl_{2} → SO_{2}Cl_{2}

The product can be purified by fractional distillation.

=== Legacy routes ===
Sulfuryl chloride was first prepared in 1838 by the French chemist Henri Victor Regnault.

Older routes include oxidation of thionyl chloride:

5 SOCl_{2} + HgO → ClSSCl + HgCl_{2} + 3 SO_{2}Cl_{2}
2 SOCl_{2} + MnO_{2} → SO_{2} + MnCl_{2} + SO_{2}Cl_{2}

== Reactions ==
Sulfuryl chloride reacts with water, releasing hydrogen chloride gas and sulfuric acid:

2 H_{2}O + SO_{2}Cl_{2} → 2 HCl + H_{2}SO_{4}

For sulfuryl chloride, this happens at room temperature, but the related sulfuryl fluoride does not hydrolyse at temperatures up to 150 °C.

SO_{2}Cl_{2} will also decompose when heated to or above 100 °C, about 30 °C above its boiling point.

Upon standing, SO_{2}Cl_{2} decomposes to sulfur dioxide and chlorine, which gives the older samples a slightly yellowish color.

SO_{2}Cl_{2} can be used as a source of chlorine in alkane radical chlorination, initiated chemically (usually by peroxide) or by light:

CH_{4} + SO_{2}Cl_{2} → CH_{3}Cl + SO_{2} + HCl

== Uses ==
Sulfuryl chloride is used as a source of Cl_{2}. Because it is a pourable liquid, it is considered more convenient than Cl_{2} to dispense.

Sulfuryl chloride is used in the conversion of C−H to C−Cl adjacent to activating substituents such as carbonyls and sulfoxides:

RC(O)CH_{2}R' + SO_{2}Cl_{2} → RC(O)CHClR' + HCl + SO_{2}

It also chlorinates alkanes, alkenes, alkynes, aromatics, ethers (such as tetrahydrofuran) and epoxides. Such reactions occur under free radical conditions using an initiator such as AIBN. It convert thiols or disulfides into the corresponding sulfenyl chlorides:

RSH + SO_{2}Cl_{2} → RSCl + HCl + SO_{2}

Occasionally, sulfinyl chlorides result from such reactions. SO_{2}Cl_{2} can also convert alcohols to alkyl chlorides. In industry, sulfuryl chloride is most used in producing pesticides. Phosphorus pentachloride is prepared by the reaction of white phosphorus with sulfuryl chloride.

Sulfuryl chloride can also be used to treat wool to prevent shrinking.

== Precautions ==
Sulfuryl chloride is toxic, corrosive, and acts as a lachrymator. It releases hydrogen chloride upon contact with water, as well as donor solvents such as dimethyl sulfoxide and dimethylformamide.

== See also ==
- Disulfuryl chloride
- Trisulfuryl chloride
