= Peroxydisulfuryl difluoride =

Identifiers
CAS Number	13709-32-5
3D model (JSmol)	Interactive image
ChemSpider	9195015
PubChem CID	11019833
CompTox Dashboard (EPA)	DTXSID801312731
- InChI: InChI=1S/F2O6S2/c1-9(3,4)7-8-10(2,5)6 Key: CTHHBLWYPDKYFP-UHFFFAOYSA-N
- SMILES: O=S(=O)(OOS(=O)(=O)F)F

Properties
Chemical formula	F_{2}O_{6}S_{2}
Molar mass	198.11 g·mol^{−1}
Appearance	colorless liquid
Density	1.645 g/cm^{3}
Melting point	−55.4 °C (−67.7 °F; 217.8 K)
Boiling point	67.1 °C (152.8 °F; 340.2 K)
Solubility in water	reacts with water
- Except where otherwise noted, data are given for materials in their standard state (at 25 °C [77 °F], 100 kPa). Infobox references

Peroxydisulfuryl difluoride is an inorganic compound from the group of peroxides. The chemical formula is F_{2}O_{6}S_{2}.

== Synthesis ==
Peroxydisulfuryl difluoride can be obtained by the reaction of sulfur trioxide with fluorine in the presence of silver(II) fluoride or by electrolysis of fluorosulfuric acid.

2SO_{3} + F_{2} → S_{2}O_{6}F_{2}

It is also possible to prepare it by reacting chromium(V) fluoride with sulfur trioxide:

CrF_{5} + 5SO_{3} → S_{2}O_{6}F_{2} + Cr(SO_{3}F)_{3}

or by the reaction between fluorosulfuric acid and dioxygenyl hexafluoroarsenate:

2HSO_{3}F + 2[O_{2}][AsF_{6}] → S_{2}O_{6}F_{2} + 2O_{2} + 2AsF_{5} + 2HF

== Physical properties ==
Peroxydisulfuryl difluoride is a colorless liquid with an unpleasant odor that hydrolyzes with water to produce oxygen and fluorosulfuric acid. The compound can ignite organic materials upon contact.

== Chemical properties ==
It reacts with cesium fluorosulfonate and silver fluorosulfonate to produce the divalent silver compound CsAg(SO_{3}F)_{3}.

Iodine(I) fluorosulfonate can be obtained from iodine and peroxydisulfuryl difluoride:

I_{2} + S_{2}O_{6}F_{2} → 2ISO_{3}F

== Uses ==
Peroxydisulfuryl difluoride can be used to produce fluorosulfates. It is a strong oxidizing agent and can be used for the oxidation of noble metals (Ag Au Re Pt Os Rh) to the salts of fluorosulfuric acid.

== See also ==
- Disulfuryl fluoride
- Disulfuryl chloride
- Disulfuryl chloride fluoride
