= Pentafluorosulfate(IV) =

Class of fluorine compounds

- Chemical structure of pentafluorosulfate(IV) anion

Identifiers
| 3D model (JSmol) | Interactive image |
- InChI: InChI=1S/F5S/c1-6(2,3,4)5/q-1; Key: XYHBJTMLVHIFKZ-UHFFFAOYSA-N
- SMILES: F[S-](F)(F)(F)F

Properties
| Chemical formula | F_{5}S^{−} |
| Molar mass | 127.05 g·mol^{−1} |
- Except where otherwise noted, data are given for materials in their standard state (at 25 °C [77 °F], 100 kPa). Infobox references

Pentafluorosulfite or pentafluorosulfate(IV) is an anion with formula [SF_{5}]^{−}.

Most pentafluorosulfite salts are unstable, decaying info SF_{4} gas and a fluoride salt. So for example, tetramethyl ammonium pentafluorosulfite has a vapour pressure of 2-3 mm Hg of SF_{4}.

== Formation ==
Some salts can be formed by reacting SF_{4} gas at low temperature with the fluoride salt.

== Properties ==
[[]] Pentafluorosulfites are decomposed by water, but may be soluble in dimethylformamide.

The ion has a square pyramidal shape with C_{4v} symmetry. The ion has a very similar spectrum and force constants to ClF_{5}, and the spectrum is similar in form to other pentafluorides with a lone pair of electrons.

Force constants derived from the IR and Raman spectrum are: f_{R} = 4.12 mdyn/Å, f_{r} = 2.06 mdyn/Å, f_{α} = 2.26 mdyn/Å radian, f_{β} = 0.86 mdyn/Å radian, f_{rr'} = 0.52, f_{ββ'} = 0.55 mdyn/Å radian, f_{αα'} = 0.11 mdyn/Å radian, f_{rr} =0.23 mdyn/Å radian, f_{Rβ} =0.25mdyn/Å radian, f_{rβ} =0.15, f_{rβ} mdyn/Å radian, f_{ββ} = −0.20 mdyn/Å radian^{2}.

Spectrum
| point group assignment | description | band id | IR band cm^{−1} | Raman line cm^{−1} |
|---|---|---|---|---|
| A_{1} | vibration S-F axial | v1 | 793 | 796 |
| A_{1} | vibration S-F_{4} equatorial | v2 | 520 | 522 |
| A_{1} | deformation S-F_{4} umbrella | v3 | 466 | 469 |
| B_{1} | stretch S-F_{4} out of phase | v4 | - | 435 overlap |
| B_{1} | S-F_{4} out of plane | v5 | - | 269 |
| B_{2} | deformation S-F_{4} in plane | v6 | - | 342 |
| E | v_{as} | v7 | 590 | 590 |
| E | deformation F'-S-F_{4} | v8 | 430 | 435 overlap |
| E | deformation as SF_{4} in plane | v9 | - | 241 |

== Reactions ==
Trichloroisocyanuric acid can react with pentafluorosulfite to form SF_{5}Cl.

== Related ==
Selenium and tellurium also form similar anions SeF^{−}_{5} and TeF^{−}_{5}. The general term for these is pentafluorochalcogenate(IV) anions. In organic chemistry the -SF_{5} group is called pentafluoro-λ^{6}-sulfane or pentafluorosulfane, or as a prefix: pentafluoro-λ^{6}-sulfanyl or pentafluorosulfanyl.

== List ==
| formula | crystal system | space group | unit cell | cell volume | density | comment | ref |
|---|---|---|---|---|---|---|---|
| [(CH_{3})_{4}N^{+}]SF_{5}^{−} | tetragonal | P4/n | a=13.503 c=19.471 Z=4 | 3550.2 | 1.48 | | |
| [(tmg)_{3}PF]^{+}SF_{5}^{−} tmg=tetramethylguanidyl | | | | | | dissolve in THF or 1,2-difluorobenzene | |
| [(R^{1})_{3}PF]^{+}SF_{5}^{−} R1 = 1,3-di-tert-butylimidazolidin-2-ylidenamino | | | | | | | |
| Rb^{+}SF_{5}^{−} | orthorhombic | Pbnm | a = 7.76 b = 9.903 c = 6.141 Z = 4 | | | | |
| trans,trans-[Rh(Cl)_{2}(CO)(IMes)_{2}][SF_{5}] | | | | | | deep red; decomposes at room temperature | |
| trans-[Rh(Cl)(F)(CO)(IMes)_{2}][SF_{5}] | | | | | | decomposes at room temperature | |
| Cs^{+}SF_{5}^{−} | tetrahedral | P4̅b2 | a = 10.32 c = 6.276 Z = 1 | | | | |
| (Cs^{+})_{6}(SF_{5}^{−})_{4} (HF_{2}^{−})_{2} | | | | | | | |
| [Cs^{+}.(18-crown-6)_{2}] [SF_{5}^{−}] | | | | | | | |
| [Cs(tetraglyme)_{2}][SF_{5}] | tetrahedral | P4̅2_{1}c | a =13.1515 c=17.792 | | | | |
