= Fluorosulfates =

Class of Chemical Compounds

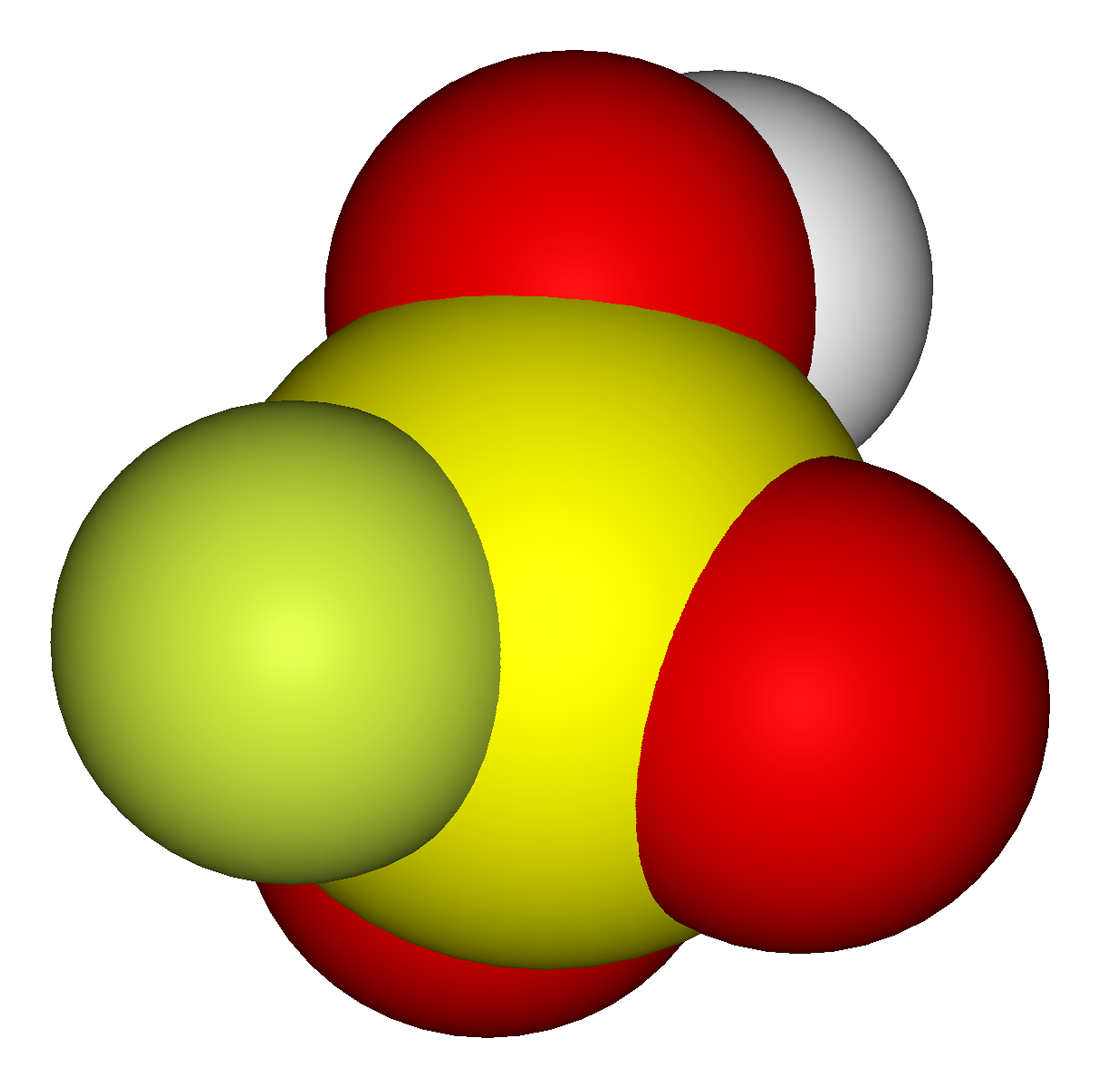
The parent acid, fluorosulfuric acid.

The fluorosulfates or fluorosulfonates are a set of salts of fluorosulfuric acid containing the fluorosulfonate anion SO_{3}F^{−}. The fluorosulfate anion can be treated as though it were a hydrogen sulfate anion with hydroxyl substituted by fluorine. The fluorosulfate ion has a low propensity to form complexes with metal cations. Since fluorine is similar in size to oxygen, the fluorosulfate ion is roughly tetrahedral and forms salts similar to those of the perchlorate ion. It is isoelectronic with sulfate, SO^{2−}_{4}. When an organic group is substituted for the anions, organic fluorosulfonates are formed.

In solution the fluorosulfate anion is completely ionised. The volume of the ions is 47.8 cm^{3}/mol. Quaternary ammonium and most metal ions can form fluorosulfate salts. Different ways to make these salts include treating a metal chloride with anhydrous fluorosulfuric acid, releasing hydrogen chloride gas. Double decomposition methods utilising a metal sulfate with barium fluorosulfate, or a metal chloride with silver fluorosulfate, leave the metal salt in solution.

The fluorosulfate anion is weakly coordinating and difficult to oxidise. It is important historically as a model weakly coordinating anion. However, by the twenty-first century fluorosulfate was superseded in this use, in particular by BARF.

Many pseudobinary fluorosulfate salts are known. They are called pseudobinary because, although there is one other element, there are four kinds of atoms. Nonmetal pseudobinary fluorosulfates are known for including those of halogens and xenon.

Some pseudoternary fluorosulfates exist, including Cs[Sb(SO_{3}F)_{6}], Cs[Au(SO_{3}F)_{4}], Cs_{2}[Pt(SO_{3}F)_{6}].

Fluoroselenates (SeO_{3}F^{−}) are unknown as of 2023. Known related compounds include fluorooxotellurates, hydroxyfluorooxotellurates, fluorochromates (CrO_{3}F^{−}), fluoroselenites (SeO_{2}F^{−}) and fluorosulfites (SO_{2}F^{−}). Sulfate fluorides are distinct, as they contain fluoride ions without a bond to the sulfate groups.

There exists one fluorosulfate mixed anion compound, which also contains carbonate and chloride, containing mineral called reederite-(Y).

== Compounds ==
Formula	Name	Colour	Decomposition temperature (°C)	Decomposition product	Crystal	Ref
LiSO_{3}F	lithium fluorosulfate				C2/m a=8.54 b=7.62 c=4.98 β=90.0 V=81	
Be(SO_{3}F)_{2}				SO_{3}		
CF_{3}(SO_{3}F)						
CF_{2}(SO_{3}F)_{2}						
CF(SO_{3}F)_{3}						
C(SO_{3}F)_{4}						
NH_{4}SO_{3}F	ammonium fluorosulfate				Orthorhombic Pnma a=8.97 b=6.00 c=7.54 V=101.4 Z=4	
N(CH_{3})_{4}SO_{3}F	tetramethylammonium fluorosulfate				Orthorhombic Pnma a=8.38 b=8.38 c=5.86 V=102.88 Z=4	
N^{III}OSO_{3}F	nitrosyl fluorosulfonate		melts 156		density 1.96	
N^{V}O_{2}SO_{3}F	nitronium fluorosulfinate					
C(NH_{2})_{3}SO_{3}F	guanidinium fluorosulfinate				SHQ: 5 × KDP; birefringence: 0.133@1064 nm	
S_{4}(SO_{3}F)_{2}	tetrasulfur fluorosulfate					
S_{2}O_{6}F_{2}	bis(fluorosulfuryl) peroxide					
NaSO_{3}F	sodium fluorosulfate				Hexagonal a=5.4812 b=5.4812 c=6.5172 V=169.57 Z=2 D=2.390	
Mg(SO_{3}F)_{2}	magnesium fluorosulfonate			SO_{3}		
Al(SO_{3}F)_{2}.3CH_{3}CN						
Al(SO_{3}F)_{3}	aluminium fluorosulfate	white			polymeric, fluorosulfate is bidentate and bridged	
Si(SO_{3}F)_{4}	silicon tetrafluorosulfonate			S_{2}O_{5}F_{2} SiO_{2}		
P^{V}O(SO_{3}F)_{3}	phosphoryl trifluorosulfonate			S_{2}O_{5}F_{2}		
PO(SO_{3}F)						
ClSO_{3}F	chlorosulfuryl fluoride					
ClO_{2}SO_{3}F	chloryl fluorosulfate	red or pale yellow	low melting point			
KSO_{3}F	potassium fluorosulfate				Pnma a=8.62 b=5.84 c=7.35 V=92.5	
Ca(SO_{3}F)_{2}				CaF_{2} SO_{3}		
Ti^{IV}(SO_{3}F)_{4}	titanium tetrafluorosulfonate titanium(IV) fluorosulfonate			S_{2}O_{5}F_{2}		
VO(SO_{3}F)_{3}		deep red liquid				
Cr^{VI}O_{2}(SO_{3}F)_{2}	chromyl fluorosulfate	green or brown				
Mn(SO_{3}F)_{2}						
MnO(SO_{3}F)		brownish black				
Mn(SO_{3}F)_{3}						
Mn^{I}(CO)_{4}(SO_{3}F)						
Mn^{I}(CO)_{5}(SO_{3}F)						
Rb_{2}Mn(SO_{3}F)_{5}						
Cs_{2}Mn(SO_{3}F)_{5}						
Fe^{III}(SO_{3}F)_{3}	ferric fluorosulfate	green grey	230	S_{2}O_{5}F_{2} SO_{3} FeF_{3}		
CoO(SO_{3}F)		chocolate brown				
Ni(SO_{3}F)_{2}						
Ni(py)_{4}(SO_{3}F)_{2} py=pyridine						
NiO(SO_{3}F)		dark grey				
Cu^{II}(SO_{3}F)_{2}	cupric fluorosulfate copper(II) fluorosulfate	pale yellow/white	210	S_{2}O_{5}F_{2} SO_{3} CuSO_{4} CuF_{2}		
Cu^{II}(py)_{4}(SO_{3}F)_{2} py=pyridine						
Cu(SO_{3}F).CH_{3}CN						
Zn(SO_{3}F)_{2}	zinc fluorosulfate	white	280	SO_{3} ZnF_{2}		
Zn(py)_{4}(SO_{3}F)_{2} py=pyridine						
Ga^{III}(SO_{3}F)_{3}	gallium fluorosulfate	white	240	SO_{3}	polymeric	
As^{III}(SO_{3}F)_{3}	arsenic trifluorosulfonate arsenic(III) fluorosulfonate			S_{2}O_{5}F_{2}		
As^{V}F_{2}(SO_{3}F)_{3}						
As^{V}F_{3}(SO_{3}F)_{2}						
BrSO_{3}F	bromosulfuryl fluoride	red liquid				
RbSO_{3}F	rubidium fluorosulfate				Orthorhombic Pnma a=8.7812 b=6.0318 c=7.5108 V=397.82 Z=4 D=3.081	
Sr(SO_{3}F)_{2}				SO_{2}F_{2}		
MoO_{2}(SO_{3}F)_{2}						
Nb^{V}(SO_{3}F)_{5}	niobium pentafluorosulfonate niobium(V) fluorosulfate	colourless solution	25	SO_{3}		
NbO(SO_{3}F)_{3}		yellow liquid				
Ru(SO_{3}F)_{3}		very dark red				
CsRu(SO_{3}F)_{4}		dark brown				
ClO_{2}Ru(SO_{3}F)_{4}		black				
CsRu(SO_{3}F)_{5}		red brown				
Cs_{2}Ru(SO_{3}F)_{6}		bright orange				
K_{2}Ru(SO_{3}F)_{6}		bright orange				
Rh(SO_{3}F)_{3}		bright orange	190			
Pd(SO_{3}F)_{2}		purple	250	SO_{3} PdF_{2}		
Pd(SO_{3}F)_{3}		dark brown	180			
Pd(CO)_{2}(SO_{3}F)_{2}	bis(carbonyl)palladium(II) fluorosulfate	yellow				
c-Pd_{2}(μ-CO)_{2}](SO_{3}F)_{2}	cyclo-Bis(μ-carbonyl)dipalladium(I) Fluorosulfate	orange			monoclinic C2/c a=11.495 b=8.255 c=9.556 β =91.94 Z=8	
Ag^{I}SO_{3}F	silver fluorosulfate				P2_{1}/m a=5.413 b=8.174 c=7.544 β=94.60 V=83.17 Z=4	
Ag^{II}(SO_{3}F)_{2}	silver(II) fluorosulfate	dark brown	room temperature fast >120	Ag_{3}(SO_{3}F)_{4} SO_{3}F^{•}	monoclinic a=10.5130 Å, b= 7.7524 Å, c = 8.9366 Å, β = 117.867° V =643.88 Å^{3}, Z = 4, d = 3.15 gcm^{−3}	
Ag_{2}O(SO_{3}F)_{2}	black					
Ag^{I}_{2}Ag^{II}(SO_{3}F)_{4}	silver(I, II) fluorosulfate	black				
KAg^{I}_{2}Ag^{II}(SO_{3}F)_{5}					orthorhombic P 222_{1}, a = 6.4736 b = 7.3915 c = 17.7736	
RbAg^{I}_{2}Ag^{II}(SO_{3}F)_{5}					orthorhombic P 222_{1}, a = 6.4828 b = 7.3551c = 18.0262	
RbAg^{II}(SO_{3}F)_{3}					monoclinic P 2_{1}/m , a = 15.815 b = 15.486 c = 17.021 β = 101.513	
CsAg^{II}(SO_{3}F)_{3}					triclinic P1_ , a = 14.9241 b = 9.7046 c = 17.8465 α = 109.116°, β = 84.655° γ = 119.171°	
Cd(SO_{3}F)_{2}						
In^{III}(SO_{3}F)_{3}	Indium tri(fluorosulfate)				polymeric	
Sn^{IV}(SO_{3}F)_{4}	tin tetrafluorosulfonate tin(IV) fluorosulfonate			S_{2}O_{5}F_{2}		
SbF_{4}SO_{3}F						
Sb(SO_{3}F)_{2}.2CH_{3}CN						
Cs[Sb(SO_{3}F)_{6}]	Cesium hexakis(fluorosulfato)antimonate(V)				trigonal, R3̄ a = 12.0317 Å, c = 12.026 Å, Z = 3	
TeF_{5}SO_{3}F						
ISO_{3}F						
ICl_{2}SO_{3}F						
IBr_{2}SO_{3}F		rust brown	90	ISO_{3}F, Br_{2}		
IO_{2}SO_{3}F	iodyl fluorosulfate		100		yellow	
I^{V}F_{3}(SO_{3}F)_{2}	iodine trifluoride bisfluorosulfonate					
FXe(SO_{3}F)						
Xe^{II}(SO_{3}F)_{2}	xenon(II) fluorosulfate					
F_{5}Xe^{VI}(SO_{3}F)						
CsSO_{3}F	caesium fluorosulfate				l4_{1}/a a=5.611 b=5.611 c=14.13 V=111.3 Z=4	
Cs[H(SO_{3}F)_{2}]						
Ba(SO_{3}F)_{2}				BaSO_{4} SO_{2}F_{2}		
Ho(SO_{3}F)_{3}	holmium fluorosulfate					
Ta^{V}(SO_{3}F)_{5}	tantalum pentafluorosulfonate pentakis(fluorosulfonato)tantalum(V)	colourless solution				
Ta^{V}O(SO_{3}F)_{3}		yellow liquid				
W^{VI}O(SO_{3}F)_{4}	oxo tetrakis(fluorosulfato)tungsten(VI)	colourless liquid				
Re^{VII}O_{2}(SO_{3}F)_{3}	dioxo trisfluorosulfato rhenium(VII)	white solid				
Re^{VII}O_{3}(SO_{3}F)	trioxo fluorosulfato rhenium(VII)	yellow liquid				
Re^{I}(CO)_{5}(SO_{3}F)						
Os(SO_{3}F)_{3}		bright green	130			
Ir(SO_{3}F)_{3}						
Ir(SO_{3}F)_{4}						
Cs_{2}Ir(SO_{3}F)_{6}						
BaIr(SO_{3}F)_{6}						
(ClO_{2})_{2}Ir(SO_{3}F)_{6}						
mer-Ir(CO)_{3}(SO_{3}F)_{3}	mer-Tris(carbonyl)iridium(III) Fluorosulfate	colourless			Monoclinic P2_{1}/c, Z = 4, a = 8.476 b = 12.868 c = 12.588 β = 108.24°, V = 1304.0 MW 573.42	
Pt(SO_{3}F)_{4}						
Cs_{2}[Pt(SO_{3}F)_{6}]	cesium hexakis(fluorosulfato)platinate(IV)					
Pt(CO)_{2}(SO_{3}F)_{2}	bis(carbonyl)platinum(II) fluorosulfate	creamy white				
Au^{I}CO(SO_{3}F)						
Au^{II}(SO_{3}F)_{2}	gold(II) fluorosulfate	yellow red				
Au^{III}(SO_{3}F)_{3}						
Cs[Au(SO_{3}F)_{4}]	Cesium Tetrakis(fluorosulfato)aurate(III)				monoclinic, C2/c a = 17.725 Å, b = 5.822 Å, c = 14.624 Å, β = 102.120°, Z = 4	
Hg(SO_{3}F)_{2}	mercuric fluorosulfate				density 3.715	
TlSO_{3}F	thallium fluorosulfate				Orthorhombic a=5.2205 b=5.5141 c=13.4378 V=386.83 Z=4 D=5.210	
TlO(SO_{3}F)		brown				
Tl^{III}(SO_{3}F)_{3}	thallium tri(fluorosulfate) thallium(III) fluorosulfonate					
Pb^{IV}(SO_{3}F)_{4}	lead(IV) fluorosulfate					
Bi^{III}(SO_{3}F)_{3}	bismuth(III) fluorosulfate tris(fluorosulfonato)bismuth(III)					
Th^{IV}(SO_{3}F)_{4}	thorium(IV) fluorosulfate					
U^{II}(SO_{3}F)_{2}					yellow	
U^{III}(SO_{3}F)_{3}					green	
U^{IV}(SO_{3}F)_{4}	uranium(IV) fluorosulfate				tan	
Na_{2}U^{IV}(SO_{3}F)_{6}						
U^{IV}O(SO_{3}F)_{2}	oxouranium(IV) fluorosulfate					
U^{VI}O_{2}(SO_{3}F)_{2}	uranyl fluorosulfate dioxouranium(VI) fluorosulfate					
