= Sulfuryl fluoride =

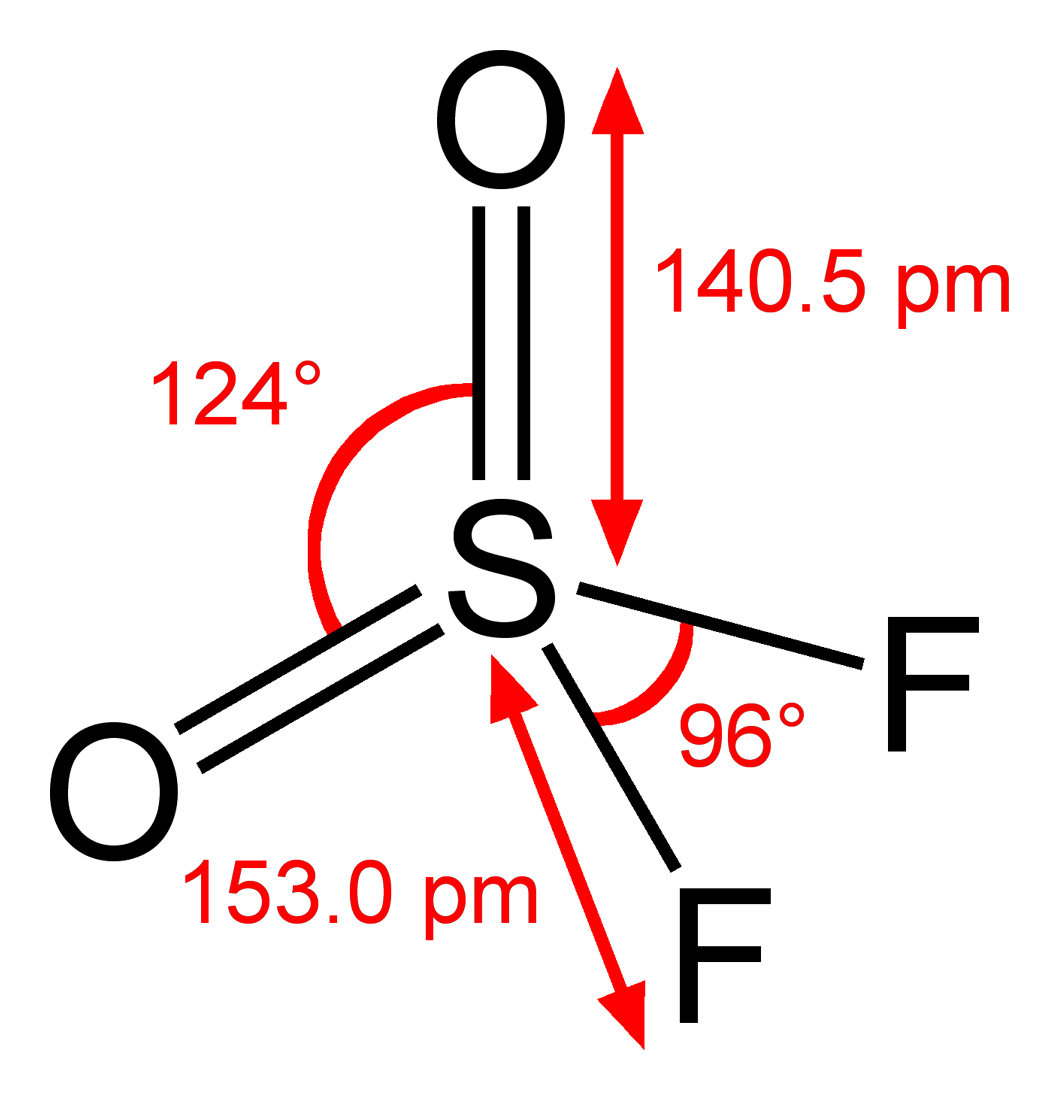
Structure and dimensions of sulfuryl fluoride
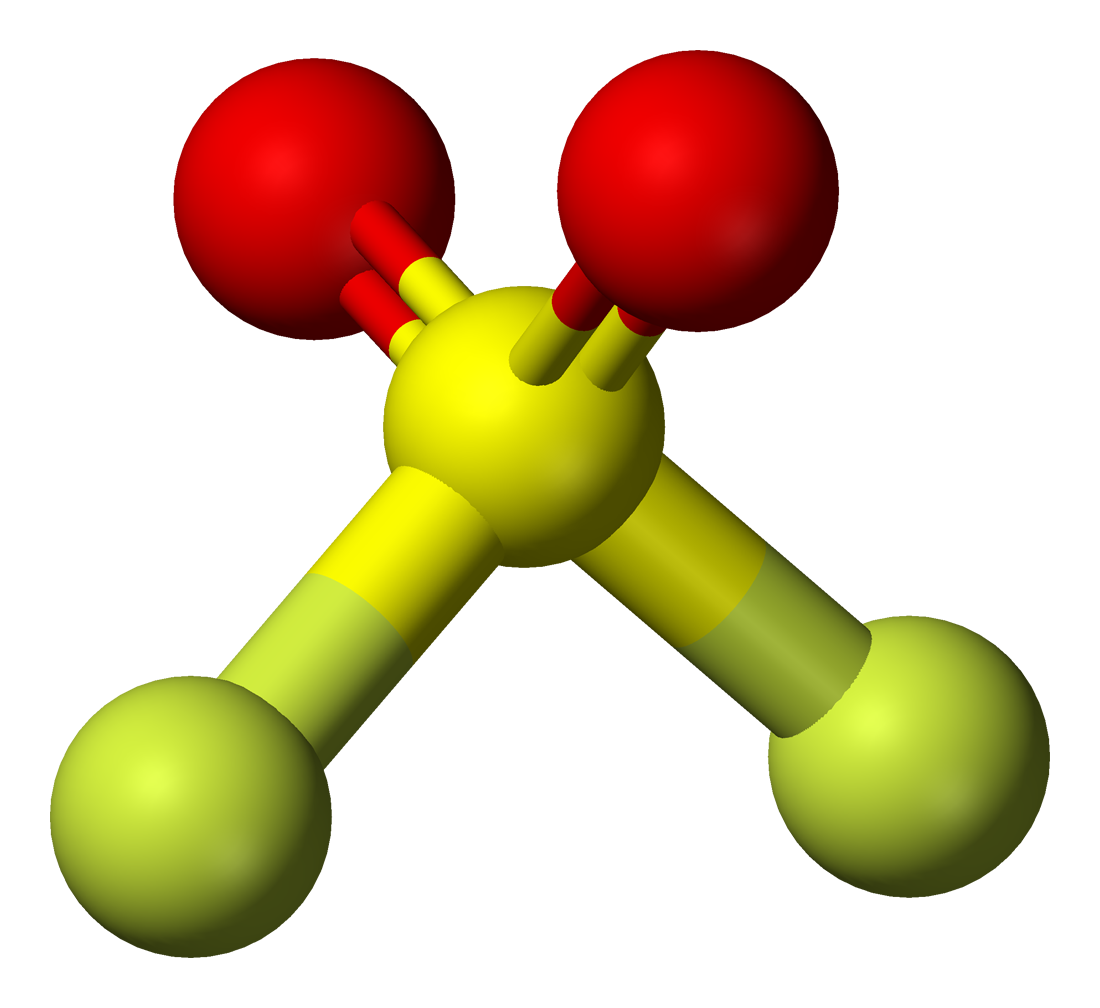
Ball-and-stick model of sulfuryl fluoride

Names
- IUPAC name Sulfuryl fluoride
- Other names Sulfonyl fluoride; Sulfur dioxide difluoride; Sulphuryl fluoride; Sulfuryl difluoride; Vikane; Zythor

Identifiers
CAS Number	2699-79-8
3D model (JSmol)	Interactive image
ChEBI	CHEBI:39287
ChemSpider	16647
ECHA InfoCard	100.018.437
PubChem CID	17607
UNII	64B59K7U6Q
CompTox Dashboard (EPA)	DTXSID9034945
- InChI: InChI=1S/F2O2S/c1-5(2,3)4 Key: OBTWBSRJZRCYQV-UHFFFAOYSA-N; InChI=1/F2O2S/c1-5(2,3)4 Key: OBTWBSRJZRCYQV-UHFFFAOYAJ
- SMILES: FS(F)(=O)=O

Properties
Chemical formula	SO_{2}F_{2}
Molar mass	102.06 g/mol
Appearance	colourless gas
Odor	odorless
Density	4.172 g/L (gas), 1.632 g/mL (liquid under compressed gas at 0 °C)
Melting point	−124.7 °C (−192.5 °F; 148.5 K)
Boiling point	−55.4 °C (−67.7 °F; 217.8 K)
Solubility in water	0.2% (0°C)
Solubility in other solvents	SO_{2}
Vapor pressure	15.8 atm (21°C)

Structure
Coordination geometry	tetrahedral

Hazards
- Occupational safety and health (OHS/OSH)
Main hazards	neurotoxin
NFPA 704 (fire diamond)	3 0 1
- Lethal dose or concentration (LD, LC)
LC_{50} (median concentration)	991 ppm (rat, 4 hr)
LC_{Lo} (lowest published)	1200 ppm (mouse, 1 hr); 5000 ppm (rabbit, 1 hr)
- NIOSH (US health exposure limits)
PEL (Permissible)	TWA 5 ppm (20 mg/m^{3})
REL (Recommended)	TWA 5 ppm (20 mg/m^{3}) ST 10 ppm (40 mg/m^{3})
IDLH (Immediate danger)	200 ppm

Related compounds
Other anions	SO_{2}Cl_{2}, SO_{2}ClF
Other cations	SeO_{2}F_{2}
Related compounds	SF_{6}, SO_{3} SO_{2}F_{3}^{−} CrO_{2}F_{2}
- Except where otherwise noted, data are given for materials in their standard state (at 25 °C [77 °F], 100 kPa). Infobox references

Sulfuryl fluoride (also spelled sulphuryl fluoride) is an inorganic compound with the formula SO_{2}F_{2}. It is an easily condensed gas and has properties more similar to sulfur hexafluoride than sulfuryl chloride, being resistant to hydrolysis even up to 150 °C. It is neurotoxic and a potent greenhouse gas, but is widely used as a fumigant insecticide to control termites.

== Structure, preparation, reactions ==
The molecule is tetrahedral with C_{2v} symmetry. The S-O distance is 140.5 pm, S-F is 153.0 pm. As predicted by VSEPR, the O-S-O angle is more open than the F-S-F angle, 124° and 97°, respectively.

One synthesis begins with the preparation of potassium fluorosulfite:

SO_{2} + KF → KSO_{2}F

This salt is then chlorinated to give sulfuryl chloride fluoride:

KSO_{2}F + Cl_{2} → SO_{2}ClF + KCl

Heating the sulfuryl chloride fluoride with potassium fluorosulfite at 180 °C gives the desired product:

SO_{2}ClF + KSO_{2}F → SO_{2}F_{2} + KCl + SO_{2}

Heating metal fluorosulfonate salts also gives this molecule:

Ba(OSO_{2}F)_{2} → BaSO_{4} + SO_{2}F_{2}

It can be prepared by direct reaction of fluorine with sulfur dioxide:

SO_{2} + F_{2} → SO_{2}F_{2}

On a laboratory scale, sulfuryl fluoride has been conveniently prepared from 1,1'-sulfonyldiimidazole, in the presence of potassium fluoride and acid.

Sulfuryl fluoride is unreactive toward molten sodium metal. Similarly it is slow to hydrolyze, but eventually converts to sulfur trioxide.

Sulfuryl fluoride gas is a precursor to fluorosulfates and sulfamoyl fluorides:

SO_{2}F_{2} + ROH + base → ROSO_{2}F + Hbase^{+}F^{−}

== Use as a fumigant ==
Originally developed by the Dow Chemical Company, sulfuryl fluoride is in widespread use as a structural fumigant insecticide to control drywood termites, particularly in warm-weather portions of the southwestern and southeastern United States and in Hawaii. It has a non-specific mode of action (IRAC group 8C). Less commonly, it can also be used to control rodents, powderpost beetles, deathwatch beetles, bark beetles, and bedbugs. Its use has increased as a replacement for methyl bromide, which was phased out because of harm to the ozone layer. It is an alternative to the use of phosphine, which is acutely toxic.

=== Fumigation methodology ===
During application, the building is enclosed and filled with the gas for a period of time, usually at least 16–18 hours, sometimes as long as 72 hours. The building must then be ventilated, generally for at least 6 hours, before occupants can return. California regulations are such that the tent will be on for three to five days, which includes ventilation. In the US, sulfuryl fluoride must be transported in a vehicle marked with "Inhalation Hazard 2" placards. Most states require a license or certification for the individual applying the fumigant.

The concentration is continuously monitored and maintained at the specified level using electronic equipment. Possible leakages are also checked by low range electronic detectors. Reentry to the home is allowed when the concentration level is at or below 5 ppm. Sulfuryl fluoride is colorless and odorless, however, during the fumigation process, a warning agent called chloropicrin is first released into the building to ensure that no occupants remain. Tent fumigation is the most effective treatment for the extermination of known and unknown infestations of wood-destroying insects. Heat is the only other approved method for whole structure treatment for termites in California. Sulfuryl fluoride provides no protection from future infestations, although heavy re-infestation can take several years since drywood termites have slower growing colonies than ground termites.

=== U.S. perspective ===
Sulfuryl fluoride is marketed in the U.S. by three manufacturers, under four different brand names. Vikane (Dow) (EPA Reg. No. 62719- 4-ZA) has been commercially available since the early 1960s, with Zythor (marketed by competitor Ensystex of North Carolina) (EPA Reg. No. 81824- 1-AA) being more recently introduced gradually as its use is approved by individual states (in Florida circa 2004, but not in California until October 2006, for example). Sulfuryl fluoride has been marketed as a post-harvest fumigant for dry fruits, nuts, and grains under the trade name ProFume (U.S. EPA Reg. No. 62719- 376-AA). Most recently Drexel Chemical Company has registered Master Fume (EPA Reg. No. 19713-596-AA) for the structural market, competing against Vikane and Zythor.

== Health hazards ==
Inhalation of sulfuryl fluoride is hazardous and may result in respiratory irritation, pulmonary edema, nausea, abdominal pain, central nervous system depression, numbness in the extremities, muscle twitching, seizures, and death. These high exposures occurred when people entered into structures illegally during fumigation or after insufficient aeration. Epidemiological studies showed that fumigation workers who used sulfuryl fluoride showed neurological effects, which included reduced performance on cognitive tests and pattern memory tests, and reduced olfactory function.

=== Case studies ===
In 1987, an elderly couple was exposed to sulfuryl fluoride in their house already cleared for reentry. While the fumigation company opened windows and doors, and aerated the house with fans, sulfuryl fluoride level was not measured. It was not detected when the air was sampled 12 days after aeration. The couple experienced weakness, nausea and shortness of breath that evening. The man suffered a seizure and died the following day. His wife's condition got worse with pulmonary edema, and she died after a cardiovascular arrest 6 days later.

In 2015, a 10-year-old boy suffered severe brain damage and lost function of his left arm and leg after his home was treated with sulfuryl fluoride and insufficiently aerated, prompting a criminal investigation by the Department of Justice and the Florida Department of Agricultural and Consumer Services. Two pest control workers later pled guilty to charges of misuse of the pesticide resulting in the boy's poisoning, and were each sentenced to one year in prison.

In 2016, a 24-year-old man who allegedly entered an apartment that was being fumigated in Fremont, California to commit a burglary was exposed to sulfuryl fluoride and chloropicrin and died shortly thereafter. According to a police officer, he experienced labored breathing and was sweating before he collapsed just a few steps from the first floor window of the apartment he allegedly burglarized.

In April 2024 in Pompano Beach, Florida, two company pesticide workers died. The owner was also hospitalized but survived.

== Greenhouse gas ==
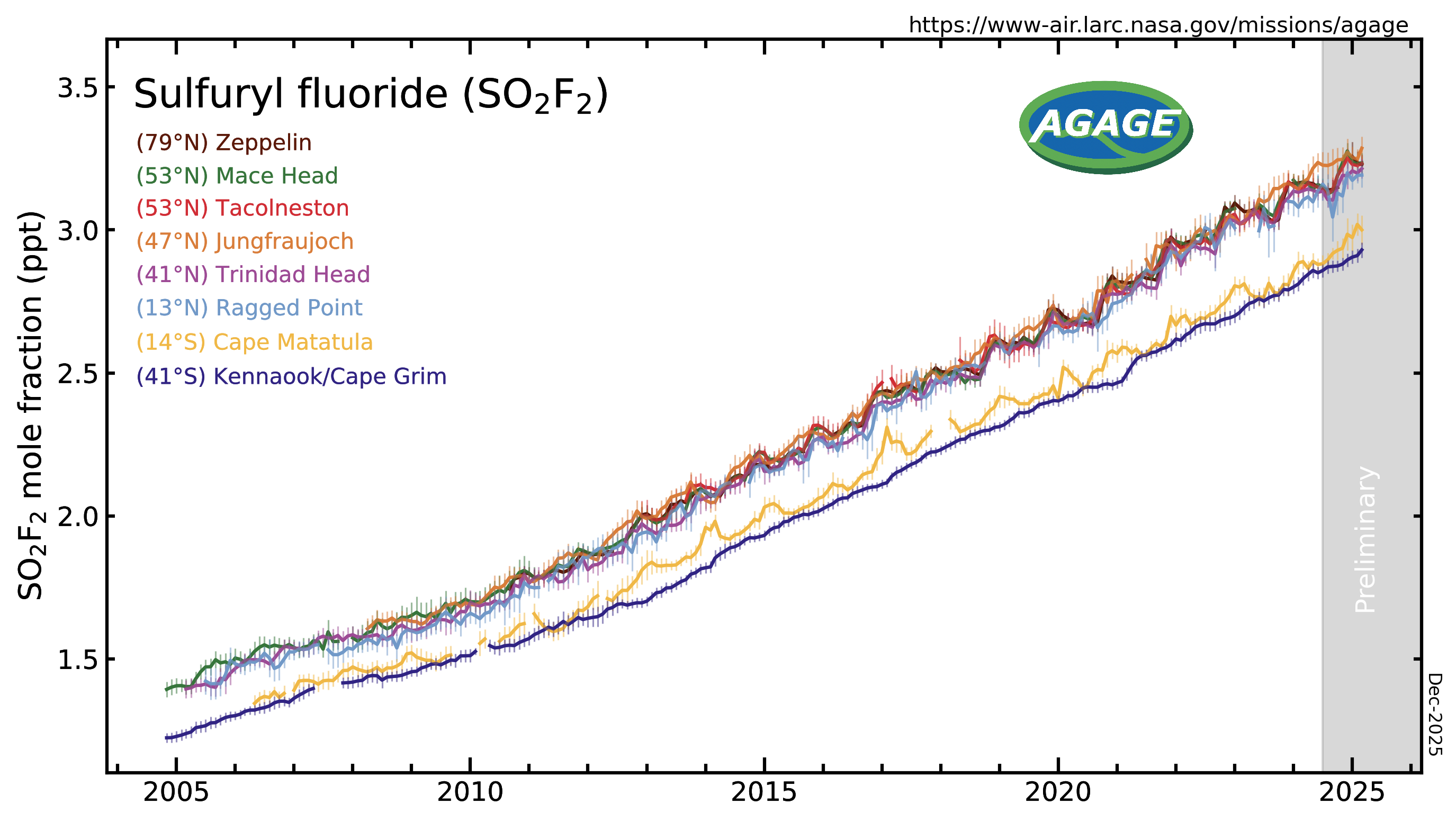
Sulfuryl fluoride (SO_{2}F_{2}) measured by the Advanced Global Atmospheric Gases Experiment (AGAGE) in the lower atmosphere (troposphere) at stations around the world. Abundances are given as pollution free monthly mean mole fractions in parts-per-trillion.

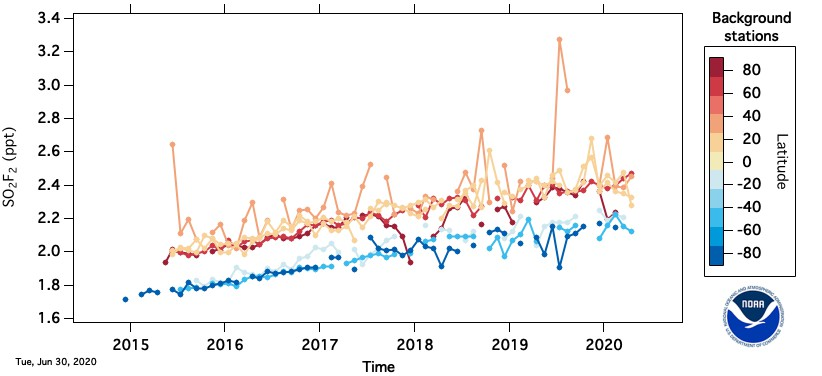
Sulfuryl fluoride timeseries at various latitudes.

Based on the first high frequency, high precision, in situ atmospheric and archived air measurements, sulfuryl fluoride has an atmospheric lifetime of 30–40 years, much longer than the 5 years earlier estimated.

Sulfuryl fluoride has been reported to be a greenhouse gas which is about 4000–5000 times more efficient in trapping infrared radiation (per kg) than carbon dioxide (per kg). The amount of sulfuryl fluoride released into the atmosphere is about 2000 metric tons per year. The most important loss process of sulfuryl fluoride is dissolution of atmospheric sulfuryl fluoride in the ocean followed by hydrolysis.
