= Sulfur fluoride =

Sulfur fluoride may refer to any of the following sulfur fluorides:

- Sulfur hexafluoride, SF_{6}
- Disulfur decafluoride, S_{2}F_{10}
- Sulfur tetrafluoride, SF_{4}
- Disulfur tetrafluoride, S_{2}F_{4}
- Sulfur difluoride, SF_{2}
- Disulfur difluoride, S_{2}F_{2}
- Thiothionyl fluoride, S_{2}F_{2} (second isomer)
- 1,3-Difluoro-trisulfane-1,1-difluoride, S_{3}F_{4}

== See also ==
- Chlorine oxides, some of which are valence isoelectronic with sulfur fluorides
