= Difluorodisulfanedifluoride =

difluorodisulfanedifluoride
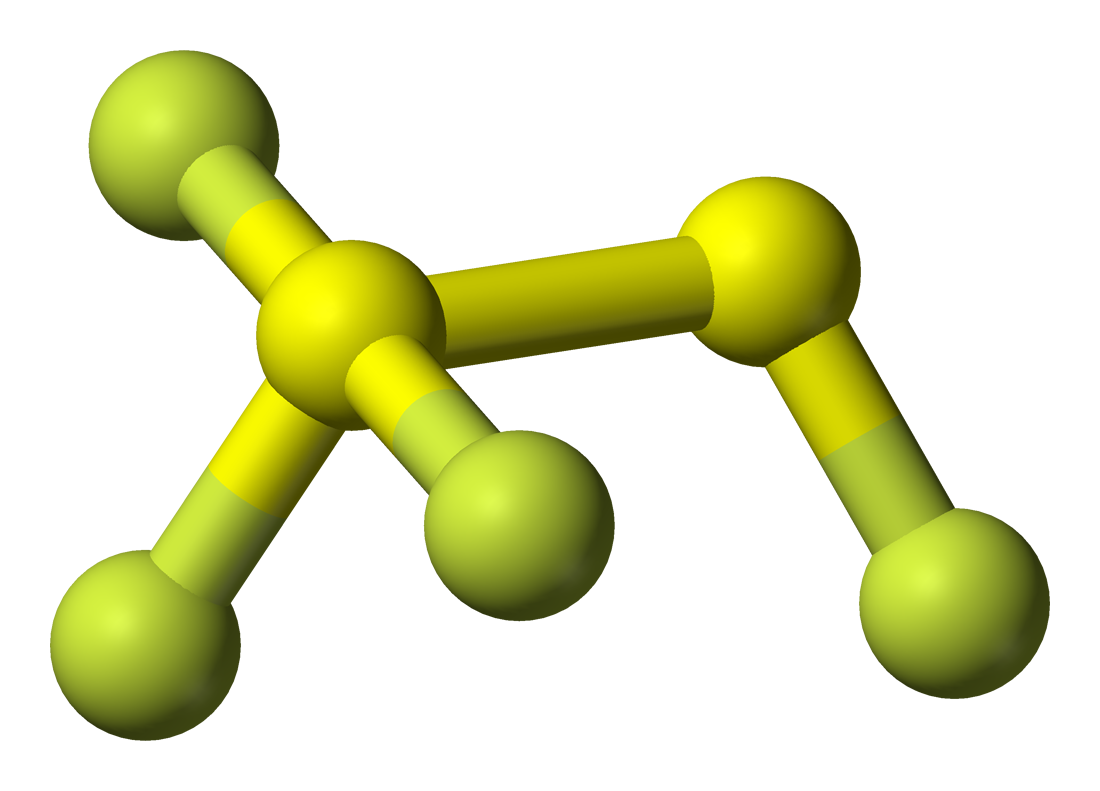

Names
- IUPAC name 1,1,1,2-tetrafluoro-1λ^{4}-disulfane
- Other names 1,2-difluorodisulfane 1,1-difluoride

Identifiers
CAS Number	27245-05-2
3D model (JSmol)	Interactive image
ChemSpider	124683
PubChem CID	141342
- InChI: : InChI=1S/F4S2/c1-5-6(2,3)4 Key: MKKRFYJAWNGNCJ-UHFFFAOYSA-N
- SMILES: S(SF)(F)(F)F

Properties
Chemical formula	S_{2}F_{4}
Molar mass	140.124 g/mol
Appearance	liquid
Density	1.81
Melting point	−98 °C (−144 °F; 175 K)
Boiling point	39 °C (102 °F; 312 K)
- Except where otherwise noted, data are given for materials in their standard state (at 25 °C [77 °F], 100 kPa). Infobox references

1,1,1,2-tetrafluorodisulfane, also known as 1,2-difluorodisulfane 1,1-difluoride or just difluorodisulfanedifluoride (FSSF_{3}) is an unstable molecular compound of fluorine and sulfur. The molecule has a pair of sulfur atoms, with one fluorine atom on one sulfur, and three fluorine atoms on the other. It has the uncommon property that all the bond lengths are different. The bond strength is not correlated with bond length but is inversely correlated with the force constant (Badger's rule). The molecule can be considered as sulfur tetrafluoride in which a sulfur atom is inserted into a S-F bond.

Atoms are labelled with the sulfur atom connected to three fluorine atoms as S_{hyp} (for hypervalent) and S_{top}. The fluorine atoms are labelled F_{top} attached to S_{top}, and on the hypervalent S atom: F_{cis}, the closest F atom to F_{top}, F_{trans} the furthest away F atom from F_{top}, and F_{eq}

Carlowitz first determined the structure in 1983.

atom 1	atom 2	bond length Å	bond dissociation energy kcal/mol	bond angle to S-S axis °
F_{top}	S_{top}	1.62	86.4	105
F_{cis}	S_{hyp}	1.67	102.1	76
F_{trans}	S_{hyp}	1.77	97.8	92
F_{eq}	S_{hyp}	1.60	86.7	106
S_{top}	S_{hyp}	2.08		

F_{eq} is 90° from F_{trans}, and 84° from F_{cis}, and the torsion compared to F_{top} is about 95°.

== Reactions ==
The dimerization reaction 2SF_{2} ⇌ FSSF_{3} is reversible. It also disproportionates: SF_{2} + FSSF_{3} → FSSF + SF_{4}. A side reaction also produces the intermediate F_{3}SSSF_{3}. hydrogen fluoride catalyses disproportionation to sulfur and sulfur tetrafluoride by forming a reactive intermediate HSF molecule. When FSSF_{3} dissociates, the F_{cis} atom forms a new bond to the S_{top} atom, and the S-S bond breaks. As a gas, at ambient and totally clean conditions, FSSF_{3} decomposes with a half life of about 10 hours. Disproportionation to SSF_{2} and SF_{4} catalysed by metal fluorides can take place in under one second. However it is indefinitely stable at -196 °C.

A symmetrical molecule F_{2}SSF_{2} is calculated to be 15.1 kcal/mol higher in energy than FSSF_{3}.

FSSF_{3} is easily hydrolysed with water.

FSSF_{3} spontaneously reacts with oxygen gas to make thionyl fluoride, the only sulfur fluoride that does not need any assistance to do this. FSSF_{3} reacts with copper at high temperatures producing copper fluoride and copper sulfide.

== Formation ==
SF_{3}SF can be made in the laboratory when low pressure (10 mm Hg) SCl_{2} vapour is passed over potassium fluoride or mercuric fluoride heated to 150 °C. Byproducts include FSSF, SSF_{2}, SF_{4}, SF_{3}SCl, and FSSCl. SF_{3}SCl can be removed from this mixture in a reaction with mercury. Separation of the sulfur fluorides can be achieved by low temperature distillation. SF_{3}SF distills just above -50 °C.

SF_{3}SF is also made in small amounts by reacting sulfur with silver fluoride, or photolysis of disulfur difluoride and SSF_{2}. The molecule is formed by the dimerization of sulfur difluoride.

== Properties ==
The nuclear magnetic resonance spectrum of FSSF_{3} shows four bands, each of eight lines at -53.2, -5.7, 26.3 and 204.1 ppm.

FSSF_{3} is stable as a solid, as a liquid below -74 °C and dissolved in other sulfur fluoride liquids. This is in contrast to SF_{2} which is only stable as a dilute gas.

Infrared vibration bands for FSSF_{3} are at 810, 678, 530, 725, and 618(S-S) cm^{−1}.

== Related ==
The related compound FSSSF_{3} has a similar structure, but with an extra sulfur atom in the chain. Thiothionyltetrafluoride, S=SF_{4} may exist as a gas. It is less energetically favourable to FSSF_{3} by 37 kJ/mol, but has a high energy barrier of 267 kJ/mol. However it may disproportionate rapidly to sulfur and sulfur tetrafluoride. The other known sulfur fluorides are sulfur difluoride, sulfur tetrafluoride, sulfur hexafluoride, disulfur decafluoride, disulfur difluoride and thiothionyl fluoride, difluorotrisulfane, and difluorotetrasulfane. The F_{top} atom can be substituted with Cl to yield ClSSF_{3} (2-chloro-1,1,1-trifluorodisulfane).

== Extra reading ==
- Lindquist, Beth A.; Engdahl, Alaina L.; Woon, David E.; Dunning, Thom H. (30 October 2014). "Insights into the Electronic Structure of Disulfur Tetrafluoride Isomers from Generalized Valence Bond Theory". The Journal of Physical Chemistry A. 118 (43): 10117–10126. Bibcode:2014JPCA..11810117L. doi:10.1021/jp5085444. PMID 25271848.
- Lösking, O.; Willner, H.; Baumgärtel, H.; Jochims, H. W.; Rühl, E. (November 1985). "Chalkogenfluoride in niedrigen Oxydationsstufen. X Thermochemische Daten und Photoionisations-Massenspektren von SSF2, FSSF, SF3SF und SF3SSF". Zeitschrift für anorganische und allgemeine Chemie (in German). 530 (11): 169–177. Bibcode:1985ZAACh.530..169L. doi:10.1002/zaac.19855301120. What happens when irradiated by ultraviolet photons.
- Henry, Rzepa (12 September 2013). "The dimer of SF2: small is beautiful (and weird)". Henry Rzepa. animation of dissociation
- Extance, Andy (12 September 2013). "Sulfur difluoride dimer exposes bonding strangeness". Chemistry World.
