= Chlorine oxide =

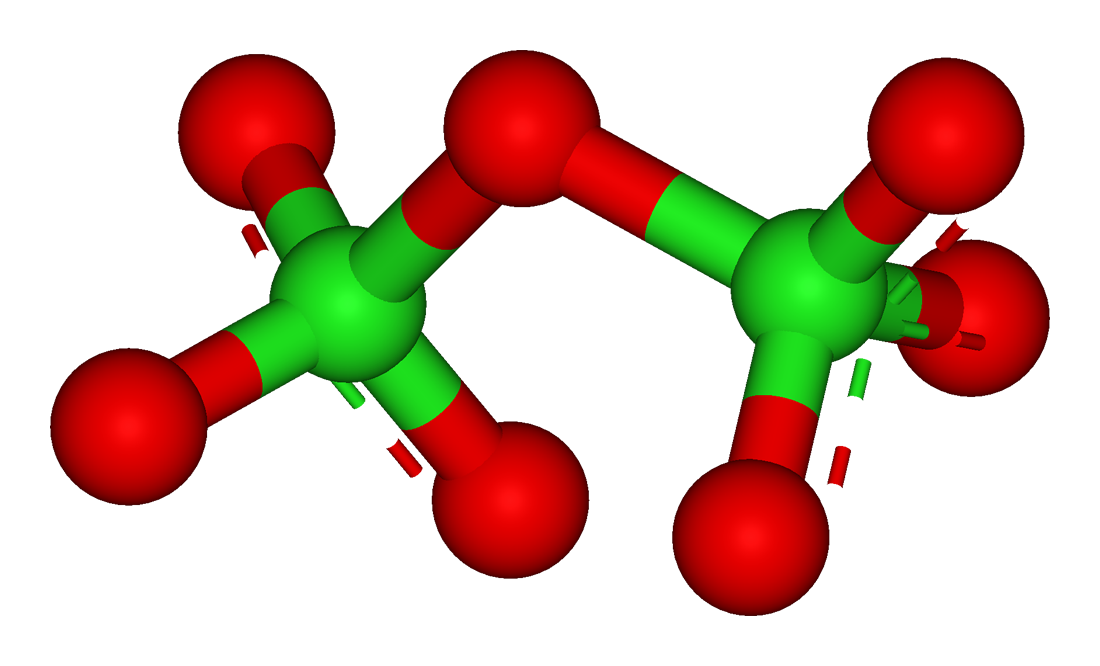
Dichlorine heptoxide, Cl_{2}O_{7}

Chlorine and oxygen can bond in a number of ways:

- chlorine monoxide radical, ClO•, chlorine (II) oxide radical
- chloroperoxyl radical, ClO_{2}•, chlorine (II) peroxide radical
- chlorine dioxide, ClO_{2}, chlorine (IV) oxide
- chlorine trioxide radical, ClO_{3}•, chlorine (VI) oxide radical
- chlorine tetroxide radical, ClO_{4}•, chlorine (VII) oxide radical
- dichlorine monoxide, Cl_{2}O, chlorine (I) oxide
- chlorine peroxide, Cl_{2}O_{2}, dimer of chlorine monoxide radical or ClO dimer, chlorine (I) peroxide
  - chloryl chloride, ClO_{2}Cl, chlorine (0,IV) oxide
  - chlorine chlorite, ClOClO, chlorine (I,III) oxide
- dichlorine trioxide, Cl_{2}O_{3} as O−Cl−ClO_{2}, chlorine (III,V) oxide
  - dichlorine trioxide, Cl_{2}O_{3} as possible isomer Cl−O−ClO_{2}, chlorine (I,V) oxide
  - dichlorine trioxide, Cl_{2}O_{3} as hypothetical isomer O−Cl−O−Cl−O, chlorine (III) oxide
- dichlorine tetroxide, also known as chlorine perchlorate, Cl_{2}O_{4} or ClOClO_{3}, chlorine (I,VII) oxide
- dichlorine pentoxide, Cl_{2}O_{5} or ClOOClO_{3}, is hypothetical
- dichlorine hexoxide or chloryl perchlorate, Cl_{2}O_{6} or [ClO_{2}]^{+}[ClO_{4}]^{−}, chlorine (V,VII) oxide
- dichlorine heptoxide, Cl_{2}O_{7}, chlorine (VII) oxide
- dichlorine octoxide, chlorine (VII) oxide peroxide or dimer of chlorine tetroxide radical, Cl_{2}O_{8} or (OClO_{3})_{2}

Several ions are also chlorine oxides:

- chloryl, ClO^{+}_{2}
- perchloryl, ClO^{+}_{3}
- hypochlorite, ClO^{−}
- chlorite, ClO^{−}_{2}
- chlorate, ClO^{−}_{3}
- perchlorate, ClO^{−}_{4}

== See also ==
- Oxygen fluoride(s), bromine oxide(s), iodine oxide(s) – analogous oxygen halide and halogen oxides
- Sulfur fluoride(s), sulfur chloride(s), sulfur bromide(s), sulfur iodide(s) – analogous sulfur halides, some of which are valence isoelectronic with chlorine oxides.
