= S2F2 =

S2F2 may refer to:

- Disulfur difluoride, chemical formula S_{2}F_{2}
- Thiothionyl fluoride, chemical formula S=SF_{2}
