= Sulfur dibromide =

Names
- IUPAC name: Dibromosulfane; Sulfur dibromide; Sulfur(II) dibromide
- Other names: Bromo thiohypobromite

Identifiers
CAS Number	14312-20-0
3D model (JSmol)	Interactive image
ChemSpider	123231
PubChem CID	139733
CompTox Dashboard (EPA)	DTXSID20162316
- InChI: InChI=1S/Br2S/c1-3-2 Key: XXWVVIRTHDRMEY-UHFFFAOYSA-N
- SMILES: S(Br)Br

Properties
Chemical formula	SBr_{2}
Molar mass	191.873 g/mol
Appearance	gas

Structure
Coordination geometry	C_{2v}
Molecular shape	Bent

Hazards
- GHS labelling
Pictograms	(GHS05: Corrosive) (GHS07: Exclamation mark) (GHS09: Environmental hazard)
Signal word	Danger
Safety data sheet (SDS)	ICSC 1661

Related compounds
Related	Disulfur dibromide; Thionyl bromide; Sulfuryl bromide
Related compounds	Sulfur difluoride; Sulfur tetrafluoride; Sulfur hexafluoride; Sulfur diiodide
- Except where otherwise noted, data are given for materials in their standard state (at 25 °C [77 °F], 100 kPa). verify (what is ?) Infobox references

Sulfur dibromide is the chemical compound with the formula SBr_{2}. It is a very toxic and vile smelling gas. Sulfur dibromide, like sulfur chlorides and disulfur dibromide, has a characteristic smell, like that of burning rubber.

Sulfur dibromide readily decomposes into S_{2}Br_{2} and elemental bromine. In analogy to sulfur dichloride, it hydrolyzes in water to give hydrogen bromide, sulfur dioxide and elemental sulfur.

SBr_{2} can be prepared by reacting SCl_{2} with HBr. It can also be made by reacting sulfur with Br_{2}, but due to its rapid decomposition it cannot be isolated at standard conditions. Instead, the more stable S_{2}Br_{2} is obtained.
