= Sulfur chloride =

Sulfur chloride may refer to:

- Disulfur dichloride, S_{2}Cl_{2}
- Sulfur dichloride, SCl_{2}
- Sulfur tetrachloride, SCl_{4}
