= Dichlorine pentoxide =

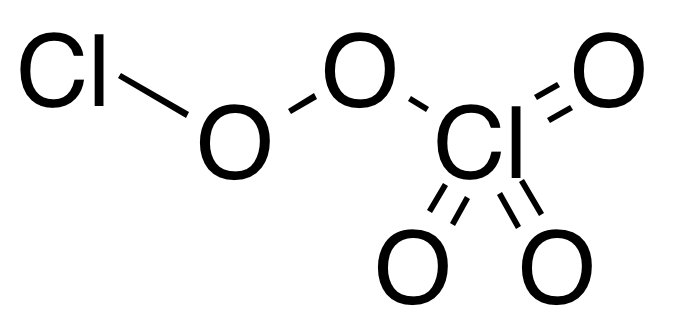

Names
- IUPAC name Dichlorine pentoxide
- Systematic IUPAC name Chlorooxy perchlorate

Identifiers
CAS Number	264271-80-9 (trioxo[μ-(peroxy-κO:κO')]dichlorine); (perchloryl chloride peroxide): 224299-16-5
3D model (JSmol)	Interactive image; (perchloryl chloride peroxide): Interactive image; Interactive image
PubChem CID	(perchloryl chloride peroxide): 153991604; 154081050 (chloryl chlorate)
CompTox Dashboard (EPA)	DTXSID101337263
- InChI: (perchloryl chloride peroxide): InChI=1S/Cl2O5/c1-6-7-2(3,4)5 Key: RHCPNFIPHZVCBF-UHFFFAOYSA-N; InChI=1S/Cl2O5/c3-1(4)7-2(5)6 Key: LJQOTKFLOZZVML-UHFFFAOYSA-N
- SMILES: O=ClOOCl(=O)=O; (perchloryl chloride peroxide): ClOOCl(=O)(=O)=O; O=Cl(=O)OCl(=O)=O

Properties
Chemical formula	Cl_{2}O_{5}
Molar mass	150.90 g·mol^{−1}

Related compounds
Related compounds	Dichlorine heptoxide
- Except where otherwise noted, data are given for materials in their standard state (at 25 °C [77 °F], 100 kPa). Infobox references

Dichlorine pentoxide is a hypothetical chlorine oxide with a chemical formula Cl_{2}O_{5}. The most stable configuration of dichlorine pentoxide is unknown, but theory predicts that the perchloryl/chloride peroxide structure would be the most stable among various isomers, such as the anhydride of chloric acid or the chlorous acid/perchloric acid mixed anhydride.

== See also ==
- Dichlorine heptoxide
- Dichlorine trioxide
- Dichlorine monoxide
- Chlorine dioxide
