= SF3 =

SF3 may refer to:

== Video games ==
- Secret Files 3, a 2013 point-and-click adventure game
- Shining Force 3, a video game
- Star Fox Adventures, the third game in the overall Star Fox franchise
- Street Fighter III, a video game
- Syphon Filter 3, a video game

== Other uses ==
- The Saab 340 turboprop airplane
- SmartFone FlickFest, an Australian film festival
- Sulfur trifluoride, a chemical compound
