= Thiothionyl fluoride =

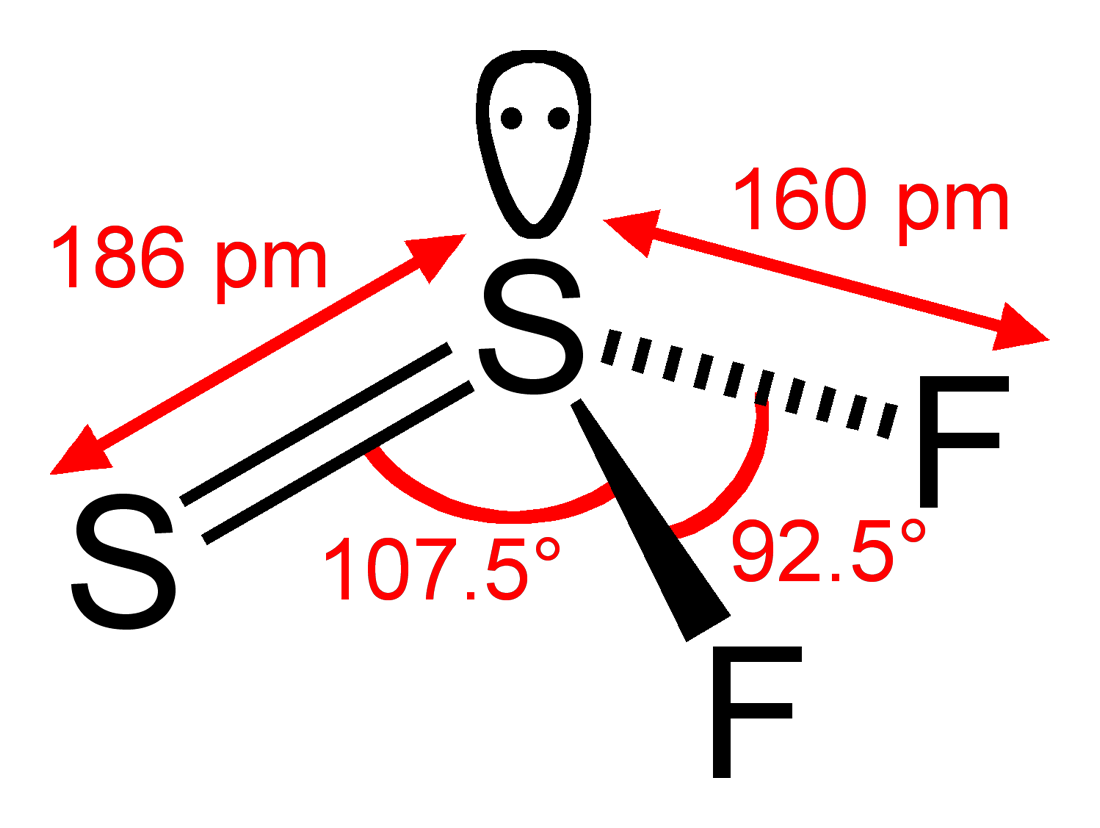

Names
- IUPAC name difluoro(sulfanylidene)-λ^{4}-sulfane
- Other names Sulphur(IV) sulfide difluoride Thiosulfinic difluoride

Identifiers
| CAS Number | 16860-99-4 |
| 3D model (JSmol) | Interactive image |
| ChemSpider | 128238 |
| PubChem CID | 145375 |
| CompTox Dashboard (EPA) | DTXSID00144397 |
- InChI: InChI=1S/F2S2/c1-4(2)3 Key: KBYVSSUWTLBZTB-UHFFFAOYSA-N
- SMILES: FS(=S)F

Properties
| Chemical formula | S=SF_{2} |
| Molar mass | 102.12 g·mol^{−1} |
| Appearance | colorless gas |
| Melting point | −164.6 °C (−264.3 °F; 108.5 K) |
| Boiling point | −10.6 °C (12.9 °F; 262.5 K) |

Related compounds
| Related compounds | Thionyl fluoride |
- Except where otherwise noted, data are given for materials in their standard state (at 25 °C [77 °F], 100 kPa). Infobox references

Thiothionyl fluoride is a chemical compound of fluorine and sulfur, with the chemical formula S=SF_{2}. It is an isomer of disulfur difluoride (difluorodisulfane) F−S−S−F.

== Preparation ==
Thiothionyl fluoride can be obtained from the reaction between disulfur dichloride with potassium fluoride at about 150 °C or with mercury(II) fluoride at 20 °C.

S_{2}Cl_{2} + 2 KF → S=SF_{2} + 2 KCl

Another possible preparation is by the reaction of nitrogen trifluoride with sulfur.

NF_{3} + 3 S → S=SF_{2} + NSF

It also forms from disulfur difluoride when in contact with alkali metal fluorides.

S=SF_{2} can also be synthesized with the reaction of potassium fluorosulfite and disulfur dichloride:

2 KSO_{2}F + S_{2}Cl_{2} → S=SF_{2} + 2 KCl + 2 SO_{2}

== Properties ==
Thiothionyl fluoride is a colorless gas. At high temperatures and pressures, it decomposes into sulfur tetrafluoride and sulfur.

2 S=SF_{2} → SF_{4} + 3 S

With hydrogen fluoride, it forms sulfur tetrafluoride and hydrogen sulfide.

S=SF_{2} + 2 HF → SF_{4} + H_{2}S

It condenses with sulfur difluoride at low temperatures to yield 1,3-difluoro-trisulfane-1,1-difluoride.

S=SF_{2} + SF_{2} → FS−S−SF_{3}
