= ClO4 =

The molecular formula ClO_{4} may refer to:

- Chlorine tetroxide (ClO_{4}·)
- Perchlorate (ClO^{−}_{4})
