= Sulfur bromide =

Sulfur bromide may refer to:

- Sulfur dibromide, SBr_{2}
- Disulfur dibromide, S_{2}Br_{2}
