= Sulfur tetrachloride =

Names
- IUPAC name Sulfur(IV) chloride

Identifiers
CAS Number	13451-08-6
3D model (JSmol)	Interactive image
ChemSpider	32818071
ECHA InfoCard	100.149.178
PubChem CID	13932016
CompTox Dashboard (EPA)	DTXSID20552819
- InChI: InChI=1/Cl4S/c1-5(2,3)4
- SMILES: ClS(Cl)(Cl)Cl

Properties
Chemical formula	SCl_{4}
Molar mass	173.87
Appearance	White powder
Melting point	−31 °C (−24 °F; 242 K)
Boiling point	−20 °C (−4 °F; 253 K) (decomposes)
Solubility in water	soluble, reacts

Hazards
- GHS labelling
Pictograms	(GHS05: Corrosive) (GHS09: Environmental hazard)
Signal word	Danger
Hazard statements	H314, H400
Precautionary statements	P260, P264, P273, P280, P301+P330+P331, P303+P361+P353, P304+P340, P305+P351+P338, P310, P321, P363, P391, P405, P501
- Except where otherwise noted, data are given for materials in their standard state (at 25 °C [77 °F], 100 kPa). Infobox references

Sulfur tetrachloride is an inorganic compound with chemical formula SCl_{4}. It has only been obtained as an unstable pale yellow solid. The corresponding SF_{4} is a stable, useful reagent.

== Preparation and structure ==
It is obtained by treating sulfur dichloride with chlorine at 193 K:

SCl_{2} + Cl_{2} → SCl_{4}

It melts with simultaneous decomposition above −20 °C.

Its solid structure is uncertain. It is probably the salt SCl_{3}^{+}Cl^{−}, since related salts are known with noncoordinating anions. In contrast to this tetrachloride, SF_{4} is a neutral molecule.

== Reactions ==
It decomposes above −30 °C (242 K) to sulfur dichloride and chlorine.

SCl_{4} → SCl_{2} + Cl_{2}

It hydrolyzes readily:

SCl_{4} + H_{2}O → SOCl_{2} + 2 HCl

Sulfur tetrachloride reacts with water, producing hydrogen chloride and sulfur dioxide through the hydrolysis process. Thionyl chloride is an implied intermediate.

SCl_{4} + 2 H_{2}O → SO_{2} + 4 HCl

It can be oxidized by nitric acid:

SCl_{4} + 2 HNO_{3} + 2 H_{2}O → H_{2}SO_{4} + 2 NO_{2}↑ + 4 HCl
