= Sulfur trifluoride =

Names
- Other names sulfur(III) fluoride trifluorosulfur radical

Identifiers
| CAS Number | 30937-38-3 |
| 3D model (JSmol) | Interactive image |
| PubChem CID | 165359357 |
| CompTox Dashboard (EPA) | DTXSID101314667 |
- InChI: InChI=1S/F3S/c1-4(2)3 Key: PSCXEUSWZWRCMQ-UHFFFAOYSA-N
- SMILES: F[S](F)F

Properties
| Chemical formula | F_{3}S |
| Molar mass | 89.06 g·mol^{−1} |

Related compounds
| Related compounds | SF_{2}, SF_{4}, SF_{6}, S_{2}F_{10} |
- Except where otherwise noted, data are given for materials in their standard state (at 25 °C [77 °F], 100 kPa). verify (what is ?) Infobox references

Sulfur trifluoride is the inorganic chemical compound with the formula SF_{3}. It is a radical.

== Structure and synthesis ==
Sulfur trifluoride is predicted to be pyramidal.

SF_{3} is generated by irradiation of crystals of trifluorosulfonium tetrafluoroborate [SF_{3}]^{+}[BF_{4}]^{−} with gamma rays.

== SF^{−}_{3} ==
A derivative formally derived from SF^{−}_{3} is the coordination complex Ir(Cl)(CO)(F)(SF_{3})(Et_{3}P)_{2} obtained by oxidative addition of sulfur tetrafluoride to Ir(Cl)(CO)(PEt_{3})_{2} (Et = C_{2}H_{5}).
