= Disulfur diiodide =

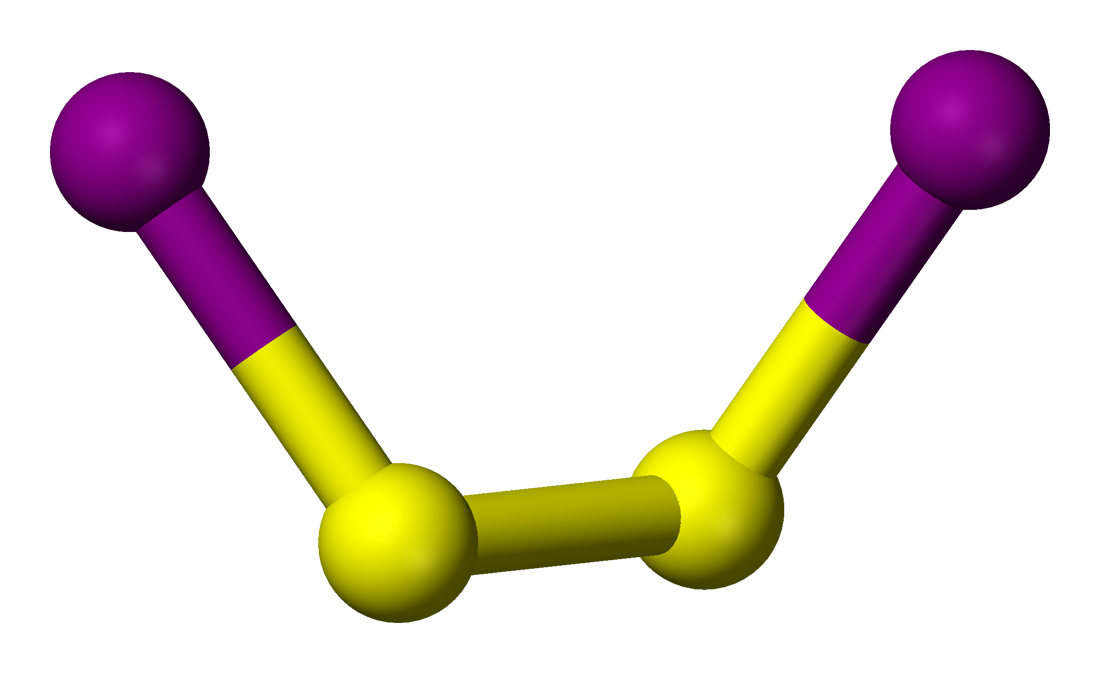
- Sulfur, S; Iodine, I

Names
- IUPAC name Diiododisulfane
- Systematic IUPAC name Iodosulfanyl thiohypoiodite
- Other names Sulfur monoiodide (incorrect name)

Identifiers
CAS Number	53280-15-2
3D model (JSmol)	Interactive image
ChemSpider	31043639
ECHA InfoCard	100.053.127
EC Number	258-458-4
PubChem CID	71774781
CompTox Dashboard (EPA)	DTXSID101315384
- InChI: InChI=1S/I2S2/c1-3-4-2 Key: NJLGSHIGTKGJLG-UHFFFAOYSA-N
- SMILES: S(SI)I

Properties
Chemical formula	S_{2}I_{2}
Molar mass	317.93 g·mol^{−1}
Appearance	Reddish-brown solid
Melting point	−30 °C (−22 °F; 243 K) (decomposes)
Solubility	Soluble in carbon tetrachloride, slightly soluble in pentane

Structure
Point group	C_{2}
Coordination geometry	2 at sulfur atoms
Molecular shape	gauche

Related compounds
Related compounds	Hydrogen disulfide; Disulfur difluoride; Disulfur dichloride; Disulfur dibromide
- Except where otherwise noted, data are given for materials in their standard state (at 25 °C [77 °F], 100 kPa). Infobox references

Disulfur diiodide is an unstable inorganic chemical compound with the chemical formula S_{2}I_{2}. It is a red-brown solid that decomposes above −30 °C to elemental sulfur and iodine.

== Production ==
=== Reaction of sulfur and iodine ===
The first attempt and claim to produce a sulfur iodide were made in 1813 by Bernard Courtois when exploring the properties of his newly discovered element, iodine. He reacted to sulfur and iodine, claiming they had made a compound. However, this production was doubted by Gay-Lussac. Between 1827 and 1896, more attempts were made to make sulfur iodide by combining the elements; however, all were inconclusive on the existence of the compound or failed. Later, when thermal analysis was developed, it was shown that when the elements were combined, it only resulted in a mixture, not a compound.

=== Production by double replacement ===
When attempts to produce sulfur iodide by the direct combination of the elements failed to overcome the low thermodynamic stability of the compound, production by double replacement was attempted between 1833 and 1886. Some reactions that were attempted was the reaction of disulfur dichloride and hydroiodic acid:

S_{2}Cl_{2} + 2 HI → S_{2}I_{2} + 2 HCl

The reaction of hydrogen sulfide and iodine trichloride:

3 H_{2}S + 2 ICl_{3} → S_{3}I_{2} + 6 HCl

The reaction of hydroiodic acid and sulfur:

2 HI + 3 S → H_{2}S + S_{2}I_{2}

The reaction of disulfur dichloride and potassium iodide:

S_{2}Cl_{2} + 2 KI → S_{2}I_{2} + 2 KCl

and more, all assumed to have failed to produce sulfur iodide. However, the reaction between S_{2}Cl_{2} and HI attempted in 1835 was later proven to have produced disulfur diiodide.

In 1940, another production was attempted with the fourth reaction and was reported to have detected various sulfur iodides, such as disulfur diiodide and sulfur diiodide (SI_{2}). When observing the reaction of very dilute disulfur dichloride in carbon tetrachloride and potassium iodide:

S_{2}Cl_{2} + 2 KI → 2 S + I_{2} + 2 KCl

they observed a color change from yellow to reddish-brown to finally violet, which was assumed to be evidence for the formation of sulfur iodides. The compound was found to decompose at room temperature slowly in a solution, with the decomposition rate increasing with increasing temperature.

=== Isolation ===
Disulfur diiodide was first isolated by the reaction of disulfur dichloride and potassium iodide, sodium iodide, or hydrogen iodide in pentane at −90 °C, and verified by infrared spectroscopy.

== Properties ==
Disulfur diiodide is light-sensitive and is soluble in various haloalkanes, such as carbon tetrachloride.

== Other sulfur iodides ==
Sulfur diiodide (SI_{2}) has finally been reported in an argon matrix at 9 K by the reaction of sulfur dichloride and iodine; however, this has been disputed.

Sulfur and iodine react in antimony pentafluoride or arsenic pentafluoride to form the S_{7}I^{+} ion, which is stable at room temperature, unlike other sulfur-iodine compounds.

The empirical formula of disulfur diiodide is SI. It is therefore sometimes called sulfur monoiodide, but S_{2}I_{2} is a covalently bound molecule and is not the same as a SI molecule or an ionic salt having 1:1 stoichiometry. The true sulfur monoiodide molecule is a radical.
