= Bromine perchlorate =

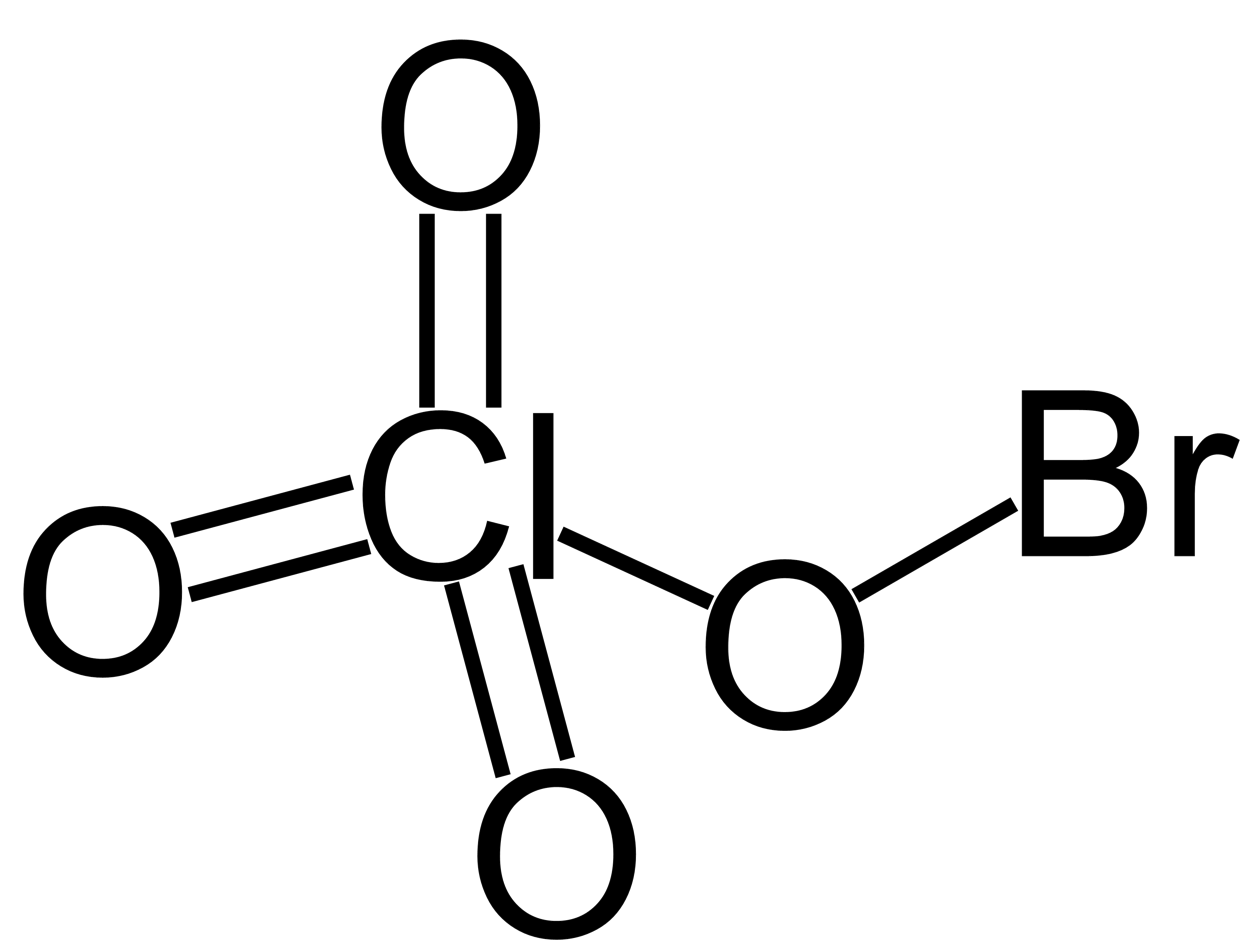

Names
- Systematic IUPAC name Bromoperchlorate
- Other names: Perchloratobromine

Identifiers
CAS Number	32707-10-1
3D model (JSmol)	Interactive image
PubChem CID	13081482
- InChI: InChI=1S/BrClO4/c1-6-2(3,4)5
- SMILES: O=Cl(=O)(=O)OBr

Properties
Chemical formula	BrClO_{4}
Molar mass	179.35 g·mol^{−1}
Appearance	Red liquid
Melting point	−78 °C (−108 °F; 195 K)
Boiling point	−20 °C (−4 °F; 253 K) (decomposes)
Vapor pressure	0.7 kPa (−23 °C)

Related compounds
Related compounds	Fluorine perchlorate Chlorine perchlorate
- Except where otherwise noted, data are given for materials in their standard state (at 25 °C [77 °F], 100 kPa). Infobox references

Bromine perchlorate is an inorganic chemical compound with the formula BrClO_{4}. Its structure is Br−O−ClO_{3}. It is a shock and light-sensitive red liquid which decomposes above −20 °C.

== Preparation and reactions ==
Bromine perchlorate can be produced from the reaction of cesium perchlorate and bromine fluorosulfate at −20 °C:

CsClO_{4} + BrSO_{3}F → BrOClO_{3} + CsSO_{3}F

Alternatively, it can also be produced by the reaction of chlorine perchlorate and bromine at −45 °C. Bromine perchlorate reacts with hydrogen bromide to regenerate bromine:

BrOClO_{3} + HBr → Br_{2} + HClO_{4}

This compound also reacts with cesium perchlorate, to produce Cs^{+}[Br(ClO_{4})_{2}]^{−} (caesium diperchloratobromate(I)), and various fluorocarbon halides, to produce fluoroalkyl perchlorates.
