= 1,3-Difluoro-trisulfane-1,1-difluoride =

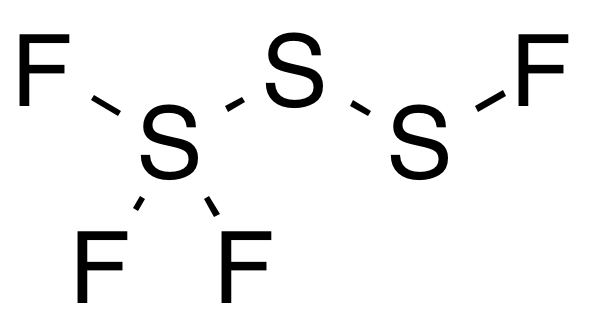

Names
- IUPAC name (Trifluoro-λ^{4}-sulfanyl)sulfanyl thiohypofluorite

Identifiers
CAS Number	93440-84-7
3D model (JSmol)	Interactive image
ChemSpider	128145
PubChem CID	145268
CompTox Dashboard (EPA)	DTXSID80239432
- InChI: InChI=1S/F4S3/c1-5-6-7(2,3)4 Key: YHBRMHFGIJPWAT-UHFFFAOYSA-N
- SMILES: FSSS(F)(F)F

Properties
Chemical formula	F_{3}S−S−SF
Molar mass	172.17 g·mol^{−1}
Melting point	−62 °C (−80 °F; 211 K)
Boiling point	94 °C (201 °F; 367 K)
- Except where otherwise noted, data are given for materials in their standard state (at 25 °C [77 °F], 100 kPa). Infobox references

1,3-Difluoro-trisulfane-1,1-difluoride is an inorganic compound with the chemical formula S_{3}F_{4}. It has the structure F_{3}S−S−SF. It is a molecular compound, consisting of sulfur in valences of 2 and 4 and fluorine. The compound consists of a chain of three sulfur atoms, with three fluorine atoms bonded to the sulfur on one end and the fourth fluorine bonded to the sulfur on the other end. It has a melting point of −62 °C and a boiling point of 94 °C. As a gas, it is unstable and breaks up to form SSF_{2} and SF_{4}.

F_{3}S−S−SF is produced by the condensation of sulfur difluoride and an isomer of SSF_{2}. The reaction

S_{3}F_{4} ⇌ SSF_{2} + SF_{2}

uses 6 kJ/mol.

Possible isomers of its F_{3}S−S−SF molecular formula include FS−SF_{2}−SF, which has a spontaneous fluorine migration to yield F_{2}S^{−}−S−^{+}SF_{2}, which in turn spontaneously fragments to give SF_{2} and SSF_{2}.
