= Dichlorine heptoxide =

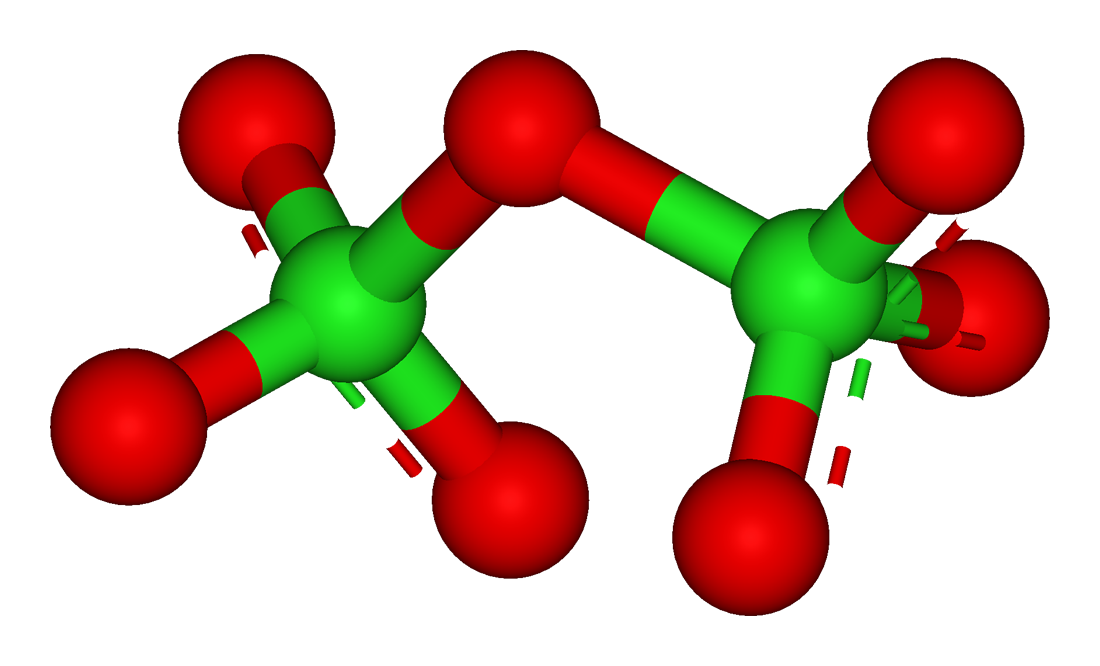

Names
- IUPAC name Dichlorine heptoxide
- Other names: Chlorine(VII) oxide; Perchloric anhydride; (Perchloryloxy)chlorane trioxide

Identifiers
| CAS Number | 12015-53-1 |
| 3D model (JSmol) | Interactive image |
| ChEBI | CHEBI:52356 |
| ChemSpider | 109884 |
| PubChem CID | 123272 |
| UNII | 22MM1X86NB |
| CompTox Dashboard (EPA) | DTXSID90152704 |
- InChI: InChI=1S/Cl2O7/c3-1(4,5)9-2(6,7)8 Key: SCDFUIZLRPEIIH-UHFFFAOYSA-N; InChI=1.001/Cl2O7/c3-1(4,5)9-2(6,7)8 Key: SCDFUIZLRPEIIH-UHFFFAOYAG
- SMILES: O=Cl(=O)(=O)OCl(=O)(=O)=O

Properties
| Chemical formula | Cl_{2}O_{7} |
| Molar mass | 182.89 g·mol^{−1} |
| Appearance | colorless liquid, colorless gas |
| Density | 1.86 g/cm^{3} (0 °C (32 °F)) |
| Melting point | −91.5 °C (−132.7 °F; 181.7 K) |
| Boiling point | 82 °C (180 °F; 355 K) |
| Solubility in water | hydrolyzes to form perchloric acid |
| Vapor pressure | 23.7 mmHg (3.16 kPa) (0 °C (32 °F)) |

Thermochemistry
| Std enthalpy of formation (Δ_{f}H^{⦵}_{298}) | 275.7 kJ⋅mol^{−1} |

Hazards
- Occupational safety and health (OHS/OSH)
| Main hazards | oxidizer, contact explosive |
| NFPA 704 (fire diamond) | 3 0 3 OX |

Related compounds
| Related chlorine oxides | Chlorine monoxide; Chlorine dioxide; Chlorine perchlorate; Dichlorine trioxide; Dichlorine hexoxide |
| Related compounds | Perchloric acid |
- Except where otherwise noted, data are given for materials in their standard state (at 25 °C [77 °F], 100 kPa). verify (what is ?) Infobox references

Dichlorine heptoxide is the chemical compound with the formula Cl_{2}O_{7}. This chlorine oxide is the anhydride of perchloric acid.

== Synthesis ==
It is produced by the careful distillation of perchloric acid in the presence of the dehydrating agent phosphorus pentoxide:

2 HClO_{4} + P_{4}O_{10} → Cl_{2}O_{7} + H_{2}P_{4}O_{11}

Cl_{2}O_{7} can be distilled off from the mixture.

This preparation method also produces lower chlorine oxides unless the product gas is distilled through a copper tube containing copper(II) oxide (CuO) wire freshly reduced to copper. Alternately the P_{2}O_{5} may be treated with ozone (O_{3}) for 0.5-3 hours prior to carrying out the reaction, followed by displacement of the ozone with oxygen gas (O_{2}).

It may also be formed by illumination of mixtures of chlorine and ozone with blue light. It slowly hydrolyzes back to perchloric acid.

== Structure ==
Cl_{2}O_{7} is an endergonic molecule, meaning it is intrinsically unstable, decomposing to its constituent elements with release of energy:

2 Cl_{2}O_{7} → 2 Cl_{2} + 7 O_{2} (ΔH° = −132 kcal/mol (−550 kJ/mol)

Dichlorine heptoxide is a covalent compound consisting of two ClO_{3} groups linked by an oxygen atom. It has an overall bent molecular geometry (C_{2} symmetry), with a Cl−O−Cl angle of 118.6°. The chlorine–oxygen bond lengths are 1.709 Å in the central region and 1.405 Å within each ClO_{3} cluster. In this compound, chlorine exists in its highest formal oxidation state of +7.

== Chemistry ==
Dichlorine heptoxide reacts with primary and secondary amines in carbon tetrachloride solution to yield perchloric amides:

2 RNH_{2} + Cl_{2}O_{7} → 2 RNH−ClO_{3} + H_{2}O
2 R_{2}NH + Cl_{2}O_{7} → 2 R_{2}N−ClO_{3} + H_{2}O

It also reacts with alkenes to give alkyl perchlorates. For example, it reacts with propene in carbon tetrachloride solution to yield isopropyl perchlorate and 1-chloro-2-propyl perchlorate.

Dichlorine heptoxide reacts with alcohols to form alkyl perchlorates.

R−OH + O_{3}Cl−O−ClO_{3} → R−O−ClO_{3} + HClO_{4}

Dichlorine heptoxide is a strongly acidic oxide, and in solution it forms an equilibrium with perchloric acid.

== Safety ==
Although it is the most stable chlorine oxide, Cl_{2}O_{7} is a strong oxidizer as well as an explosive that can be set off with flame or mechanical shock, or by contact with iodine. Nevertheless, it is less strongly oxidising than the other chlorine oxides, and does not attack sulfur, phosphorus, or paper when cold. It has the same effects on the human body as elemental chlorine, and requires the same precautions.
