= Chlorine perchlorate =

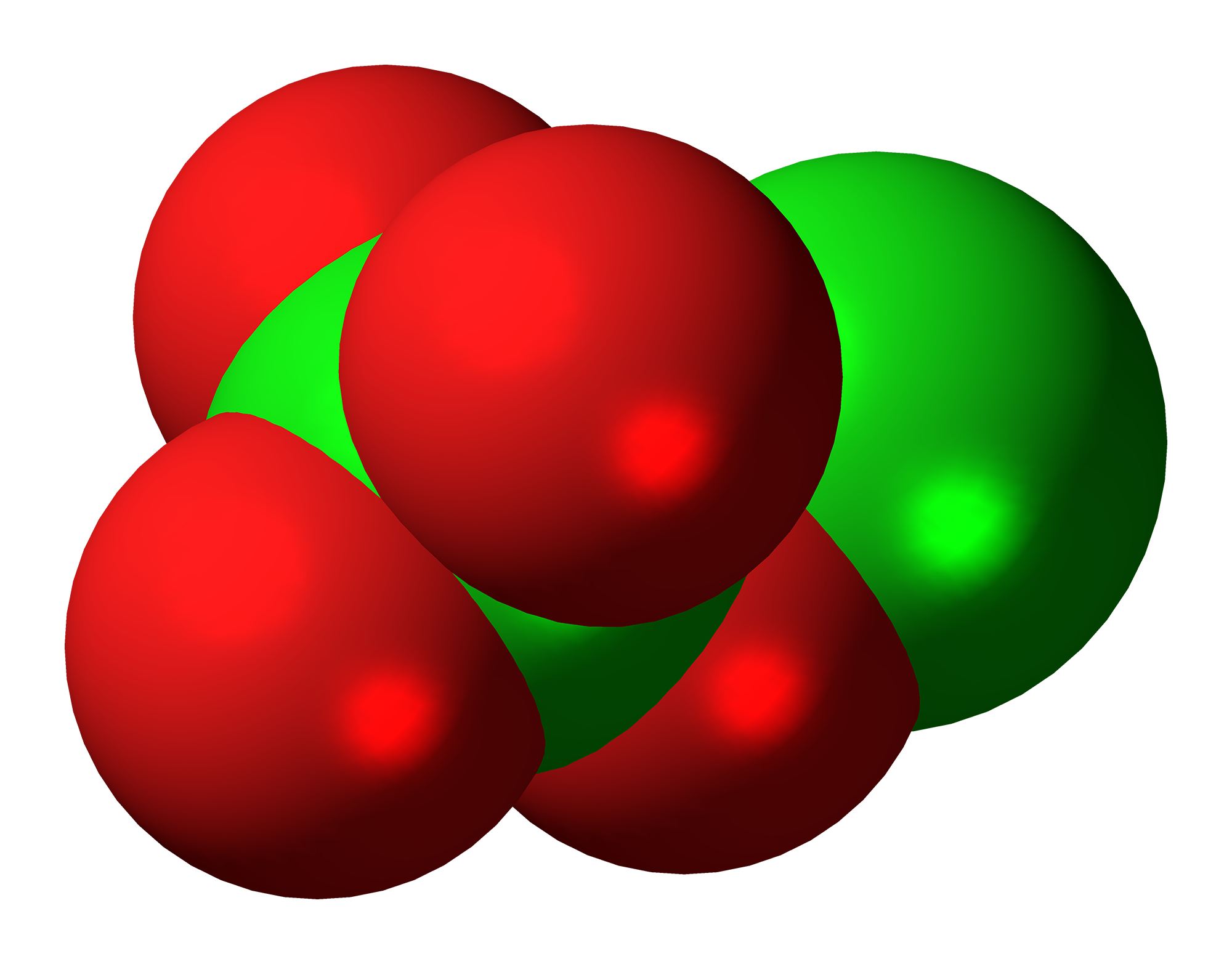

Names
- IUPAC name Chloro perchlorate
- Systematic IUPAC name Chloro perchlorate
- Other names: Chlorine(I,VII) oxide; Dichlorine tetroxide; (Chlorooxy)chlorane trioxide

Identifiers
CAS Number	27218-16-2
3D model (JSmol)	Interactive image
ChEBI	CHEBI:52353
ChemSpider	147540
PubChem CID	168667
CompTox Dashboard (EPA)	DTXSID00181686
- InChI: InChI=1S/Cl2O4/c1-6-2(3,4)5 Key: JRONPIZRZBBOBR-UHFFFAOYSA-N
- SMILES: ClO[Cl](=O)(=O)=O

Properties
Chemical formula	Cl_{2}O_{4}
Molar mass	134.90 g·mol^{−1}
Appearance	Pale green liquid
Density	1.81 g·cm^{−3}
Melting point	−117 °C (−179 °F; 156 K)
Boiling point	20 °C (68 °F; 293 K) (decomposes)
Solubility in water	Reacts

Hazards
- Occupational safety and health (OHS/OSH)
Main hazards	oxidizer
- Except where otherwise noted, data are given for materials in their standard state (at 25 °C [77 °F], 100 kPa). verify (what is ?) Infobox references

Chlorine perchlorate is a chemical compound with the formula Cl_{2}O_{4}. This chlorine oxide is an asymmetric oxide, with one chlorine atom in +1 oxidation state and the other +7, with proper formula Cl−O−ClO_{3}. It is produced by the photodimerization of chlorine dioxide (ClO_{2}) at room temperature by 436 nm ultraviolet light:

2 ClO_{2} → ClOClO_{3}

Chlorine perchlorate can also be made by the following reaction at −45 °C.

CsClO_{4} + ClOSO_{2}F → CsSO_{3}F + ClOClO_{3}

== Properties ==
Chlorine perchlorate is a pale greenish liquid. It is less stable than ClO_{2} (chlorine dioxide) and decomposes at room temperature to give O_{2} (oxygen), Cl_{2} (chlorine) and Cl_{2}O_{6} (dichlorine hexoxide):

2 ClOClO_{3} → O_{2} + Cl_{2} + Cl_{2}O_{6}

Chlorine perchlorate reacts with metal chlorides to form chlorine and the corresponding anhydrous perchlorate:

CrO_{2}Cl_{2} + 2 ClOClO_{3} → 2 Cl_{2} + CrO_{2}(ClO_{4})_{2}

TiCl_{4} + 4 ClOClO_{3} → 4 Cl_{2} + Ti(ClO_{4})_{4}

2 AgCl + 2 ClOClO_{3} → 2 AgClO_{4} + Cl_{2}

== Reactions ==
Reactant	Conditions	Products
—	Heat	dichlorine hexoxide (80%), chlorine dioxide, chlorine, oxygen
—	Ultraviolet light	dichlorine heptoxide, chlorine, oxygen
caesium iodide	−45 °C	caesium tetraperchloratoiodate(III) Cs^{+}[I(OClO_{3})_{4}]^{−} (Note: Cs^{+}[I(OClO_{3})_{4}]^{−} is a pale yellow salt which is stable at room temperature. It has a square IO_{4} unit.)
ClOSO_{2}F or ClF	—	M^{+}ClO^{−}_{4} (M = Cs or [NO_{2}]) (Note: M^{+}ClO^{−}_{4} (M = Cs or [NO_{2}]) reacts with BrOSO_{2}F at −20 °C and produces bromine perchlorate (BrOClO_{3}). Bromine perchlorate then reacts with hydrogen bromide (HBr) at −70 °C and produces elemental bromine (Br_{2}) and perchloric acid (HClO_{4}).)
bromine	−45 °C	bromine perchlorate (BrOClO_{3})
iodine(0.33 mol)	−50 °C	iodine(III) perchlorate I(OClO_{3})_{3} (Note: The last attempt to form iodine monoperchlorate (IOClO_{3}) occurred in 1972, and even at low temperatures yielded instead the triperchlorate. On warming, the latter then decomposes to iodate.)
CF_{3}I	-112 °C	CF_{3}OClO_{3}, O_{2}, Cl_{2}, Cl_{2}O_{7}, and I_{2}O_{5}.
