= Thionyl fluoride =

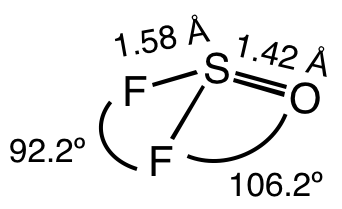
Structure
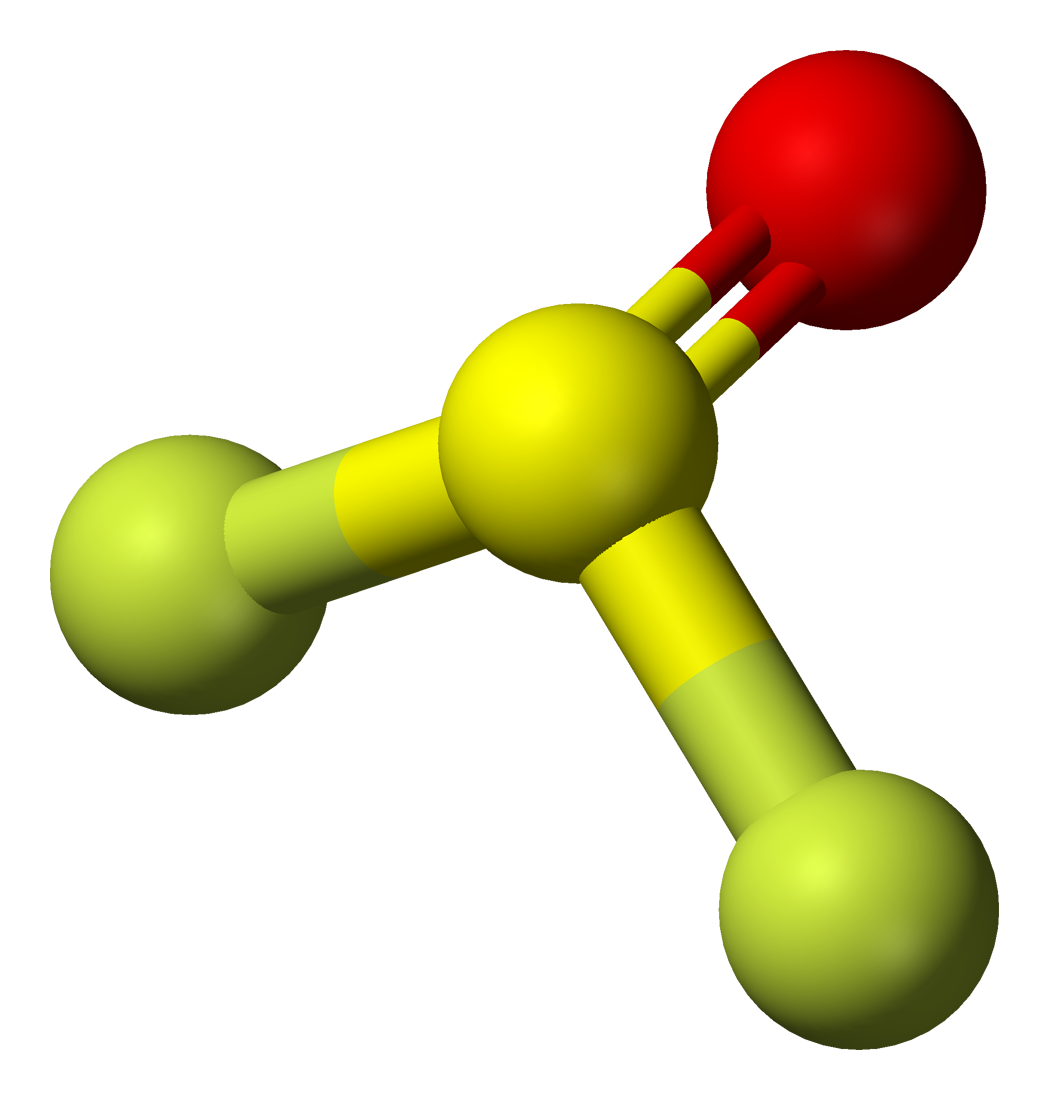
Ball-and-stick model

Names
- IUPAC name Thionyl fluoride

Identifiers
CAS Number	7783-42-8
3D model (JSmol)	Interactive image
ChemSpider	22954
ECHA InfoCard	100.029.088
EC Number	231-997-2
PubChem CID	24548
UNII	2O8P7K5BE8
CompTox Dashboard (EPA)	DTXSID1064821
- InChI: InChI=1S/F2OS/c1-4(2)3 Key: LSJNBGSOIVSBBR-UHFFFAOYSA-N; InChI=1/F2OS/c1-4(2)3 Key: LSJNBGSOIVSBBR-UHFFFAOYAL
- SMILES: FS(F)=O

Properties
Chemical formula	SOF_{2}
Molar mass	86.06 g·mol^{−1}
Appearance	colorless gas
Melting point	−110.5 °C (−166.9 °F; 162.7 K)
Boiling point	−43.8 °C (−46.8 °F; 229.3 K)
Solubility in water	hydrolysis
Solubility	soluble in ethanol, ether, benzene
Vapor pressure	75.7 kPa (-50 °C)

Structure
Molecular shape	trigonal pyramidal

Thermochemistry
Std molar entropy (S^{⦵}_{298})	278.6 J/(mol·K)
Std enthalpy of formation (Δ_{f}H^{⦵}_{298})	−715 kJ/mol
Std enthalpy of combustion (Δ_{c}H^{⦵}_{298})	56.8 J/mol

Hazards
- GHS labelling
Pictograms	(GHS05: Corrosive) (GHS06: Toxic)
Signal word	Danger
Hazard statements	H300, H310, H314, H330
Precautionary statements	P260, P262, P264, P270, P271, P280, P284, P301+P310, P301+P330+P331, P302+P350, P303+P361+P353, P304+P340, P305+P351+P338, P310, P320, P321, P330, P361, P363, P403+P233, P405, P501

Related compounds
Related oxohalides	Thionyl chloride Thionyl bromide
Related compounds	Thiothionyl fluoride Nitrosyl fluoride Carbonyl fluoride
- Except where otherwise noted, data are given for materials in their standard state (at 25 °C [77 °F], 100 kPa). verify (what is ?) Infobox references

Thionyl fluoride is the inorganic compound with the formula SOF_{2}. This colourless gas is mainly of theoretical interest, but it is a product of the degradation of sulfur hexafluoride, an insulator in electrical equipment. The molecule adopts a distorted pyramidal structure, with C_{s} symmetry. The S-O and S-F distances are 1.42 and 1.58 Å, respectively. The O-S-F and F-S-F angles are 106.2 and 92.2°, respectively.

== Synthesis and reactions ==
Thionyl fluoride can be produced by the reaction of thionyl chloride with fluoride sources such as antimony trifluoride.

3 SOCl_{2} + 2 SbF_{3} → 3 SOF_{2} + 2 SbCl_{3}

Alternatively, it arises via the fluorination of sulfur dioxide:

SO_{2} + PF_{5} → SOF_{2} + POF_{3}

Thionyl fluoride arises as a fleeting intermediate from the decomposition of sulfur hexafluoride as the result of electrical discharges which generate sulfur tetrafluoride. SF_{4} hydrolyzes to give thionyl fluoride, which in turn hydrolyzes further as described below.

As expected from the behavior of the other thionyl halides, this compound hydrolyzes readily, giving hydrogen fluoride and sulfur dioxide:

SOF_{2} + H_{2}O → 2 HF + SO_{2}

In contrast to thionyl chloride and bromide, thionyl fluoride is not useful for halogenation. The related derivative, sulfur tetrafluoride is however useful for that purpose.
