= Chlorine peroxide =

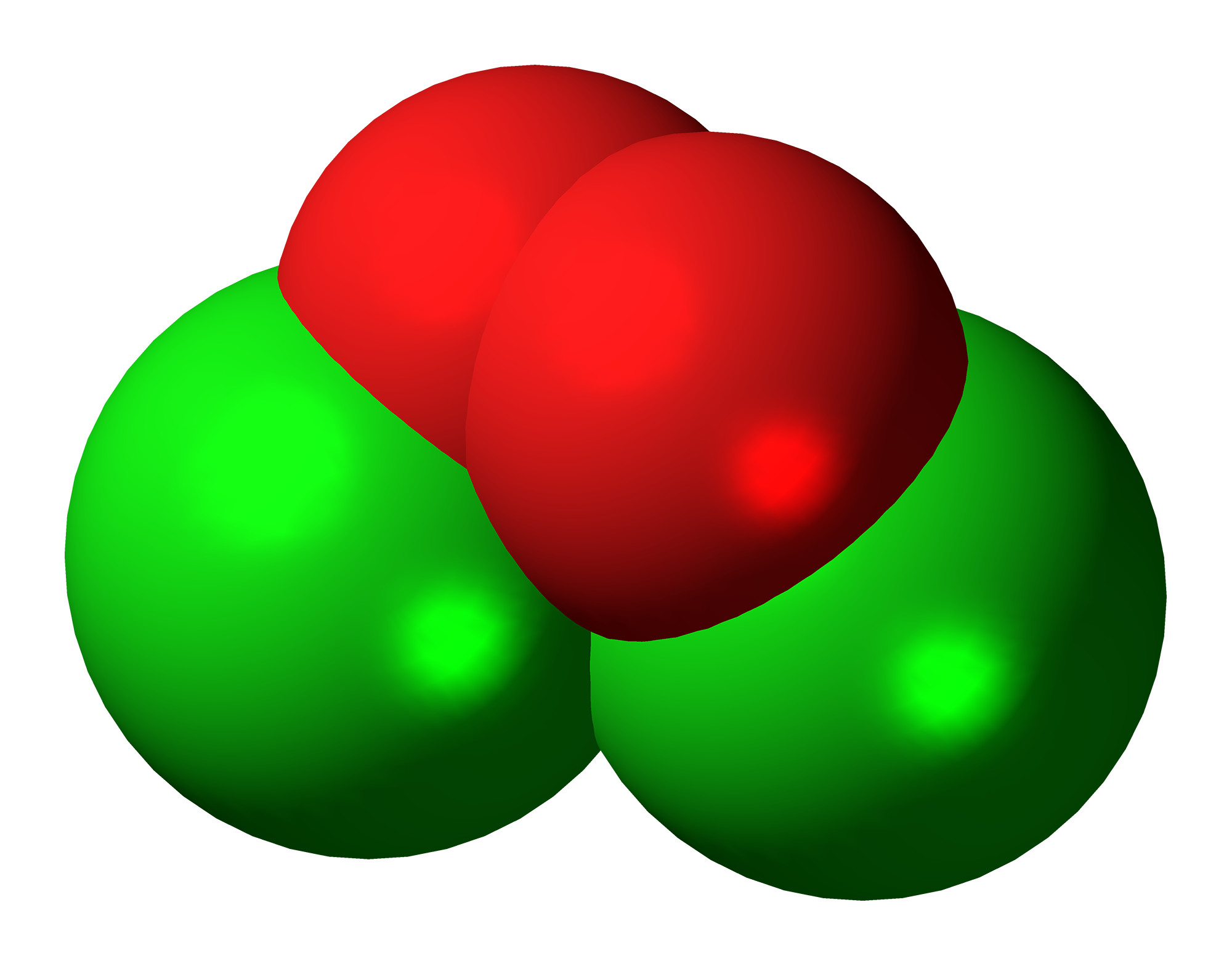

Names
- IUPAC name Chlorine peroxide
- Systematic IUPAC name Chlorooxy hypochlorite
- Other names ClO dimer

Identifiers
CAS Number	12292-23-8
3D model (JSmol)	Interactive image
ChemSpider	109895
PubChem CID	123287
CompTox Dashboard (EPA)	DTXSID001310193
- InChI: InChI=1S/Cl2O2/c1-3-4-2 Key: MAYPHUUCLRDEAZ-UHFFFAOYSA-N; InChI=1/Cl2O2/c1-3-4-2 Key: MAYPHUUCLRDEAZ-UHFFFAOYAP
- SMILES: ClOOCl

Properties
Chemical formula	Cl_{2}O_{2}
Molar mass	102.90 g·mol^{−1}
- Except where otherwise noted, data are given for materials in their standard state (at 25 °C [77 °F], 100 kPa). Infobox references

Chlorine peroxide (also known as dichlorine dioxide or ClO dimer) is a molecular compound with formula ClOOCl. Chemically, it is a dimer of the chlorine monoxide radical (ClO·). It is important in the formation of the ozone hole. Chlorine peroxide catalytically converts ozone into oxygen when it is irradiated by ultraviolet light.

== Production ==
Chlorine peroxide can be produced by laser or ultraviolet photolysis of the chlorine molecule with ozone. The lasers used to break up the chlorine molecule into atoms can be an excimer laser at 248, 308, or 352 nm wavelength. Difluorodichloromethane (CF_{2}Cl_{2}) can also act as a source of chlorine atoms for the formation of the peroxide. Microwave discharge can also break up chlorine molecules into atoms that react with ozone to make chlorine peroxide.

Cl_{2} + hν → 2Cl
Cl + O_{3} → O_{2} + ClO·
2ClO· + M → ClOOCl + M
ClOOCl + hν → Cl + ClO_{2}
ClO_{2} + M → Cl + O_{2} + M

== Properties ==
Chlorine peroxide absorbs ultraviolet light with a maximum absorbing wavelength of 245 nm. It also absorbs longer wavelengths up to 350 nm to a lesser extent. This is important as ozone absorbs up to 300 nm.

The Cl−O bond length is 1.704 Å, and the O−O bond is 1.426 Å long. The ClOO bond angle is 110.1°, and the dihedral angle between the two Cl−O−O planes is 81°
