= Chlorine tetroxide =

Names
- IUPAC name Tetraoxidochlorine

Identifiers
| CAS Number | 12133-63-0 |
| 3D model (JSmol) | Interactive image |
| ChEBI | CHEBI:29420 |
| ChemSpider | 4574089 |
| Gmelin Reference | 239881 |
| PubChem CID | 5460591 |
- InChI: InChI=1S/ClO4/c2-1(3,4)5 Key: UXZQWBXGIHHEHG-UHFFFAOYSA-N
- SMILES: O=Cl(=O)(=O)[O]

Properties
| Chemical formula | ClO_{4} |
| Molar mass | 99.45 g mol^{−1} |
- Except where otherwise noted, data are given for materials in their standard state (at 25 °C [77 °F], 100 kPa). Infobox references

Chlorine tetroxide is an unstable chlorine oxide with the chemical formula ClO_{4}.

== History ==
=== Gomberg's mistaken 1923 production ===
In 1923, chemist Moses Gomberg proposed a production method of chlorine tetroxide. He claimed that treating iodine and silver perchlorate in anhydrous diethyl ether produced it.

I_{2} + 2 AgClO_{4} → 2 AgI + (ClO_{4})_{2}

However, later researchers claimed that the product was either iodine(I) or iodine(III) perchlorate. So far, however, there is no certain evidence for the existence of iodine perchlorate either.

== Properties ==
The electron affinity energy of chlorine tetroxide can be figured out using the Born–Haber cycle and the lattice energy data of perchlorates. It is about 561 kJ/mol.

The structure of chlorine tetroxide is uncertain; the molecular point group may be C_{s}, C_{2v}, or T_{d}.

In a solid oxygen matrix ClO_{4} reacts to form ClO_{6}Cl, which has three double bonded oxygen atoms, and a chain of three oxygen atoms -O-O-O^{•} attached to the chlorine.
