= Disulfur dichloride =

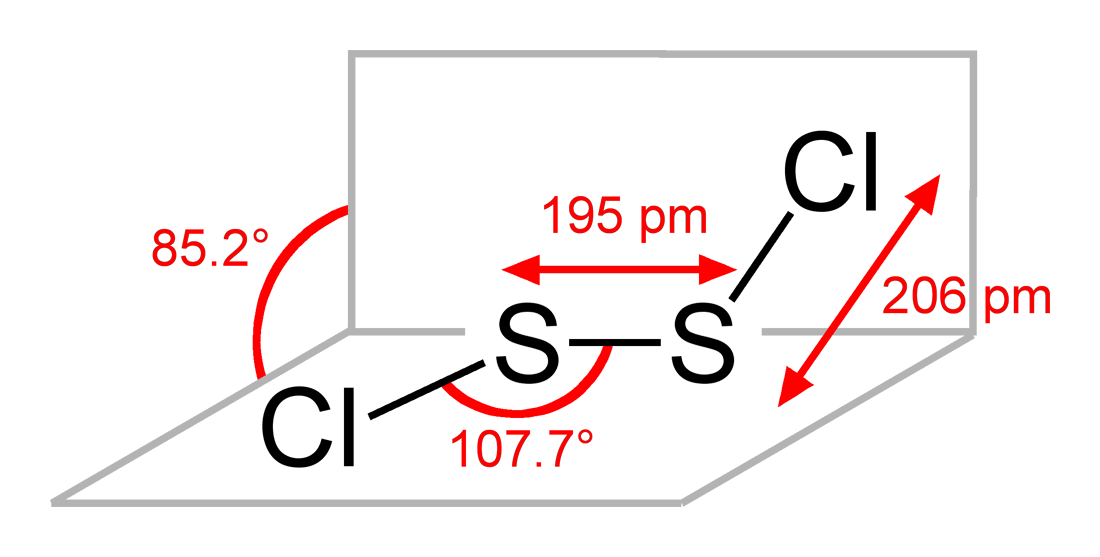
- Wireframe model of disulfur dichloride

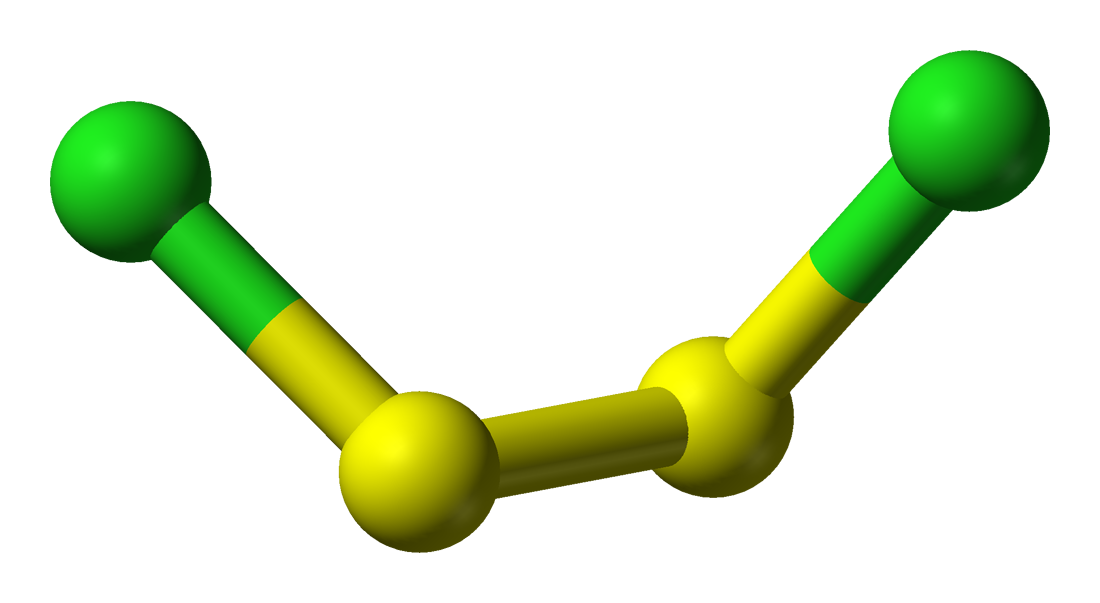
Ball and stick model of disulfur dichloride
Sulfur, S;
Chlorine, Cl
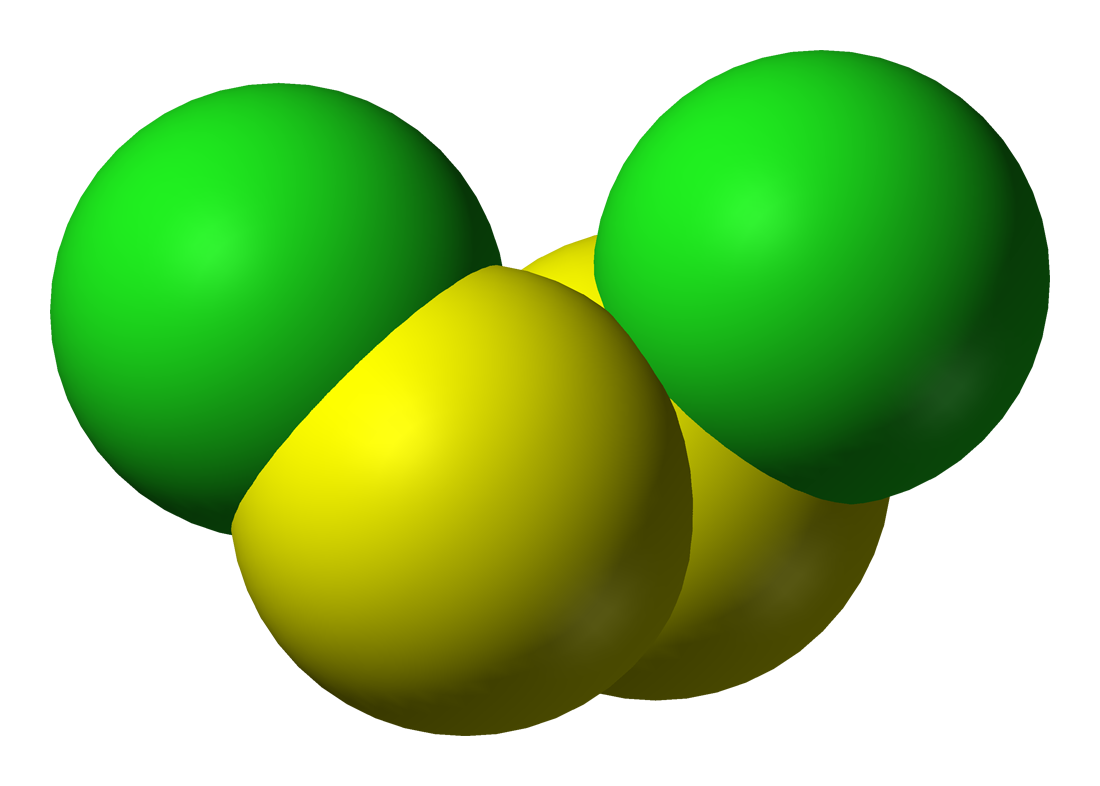
Spacefill model of disulfur dichloride
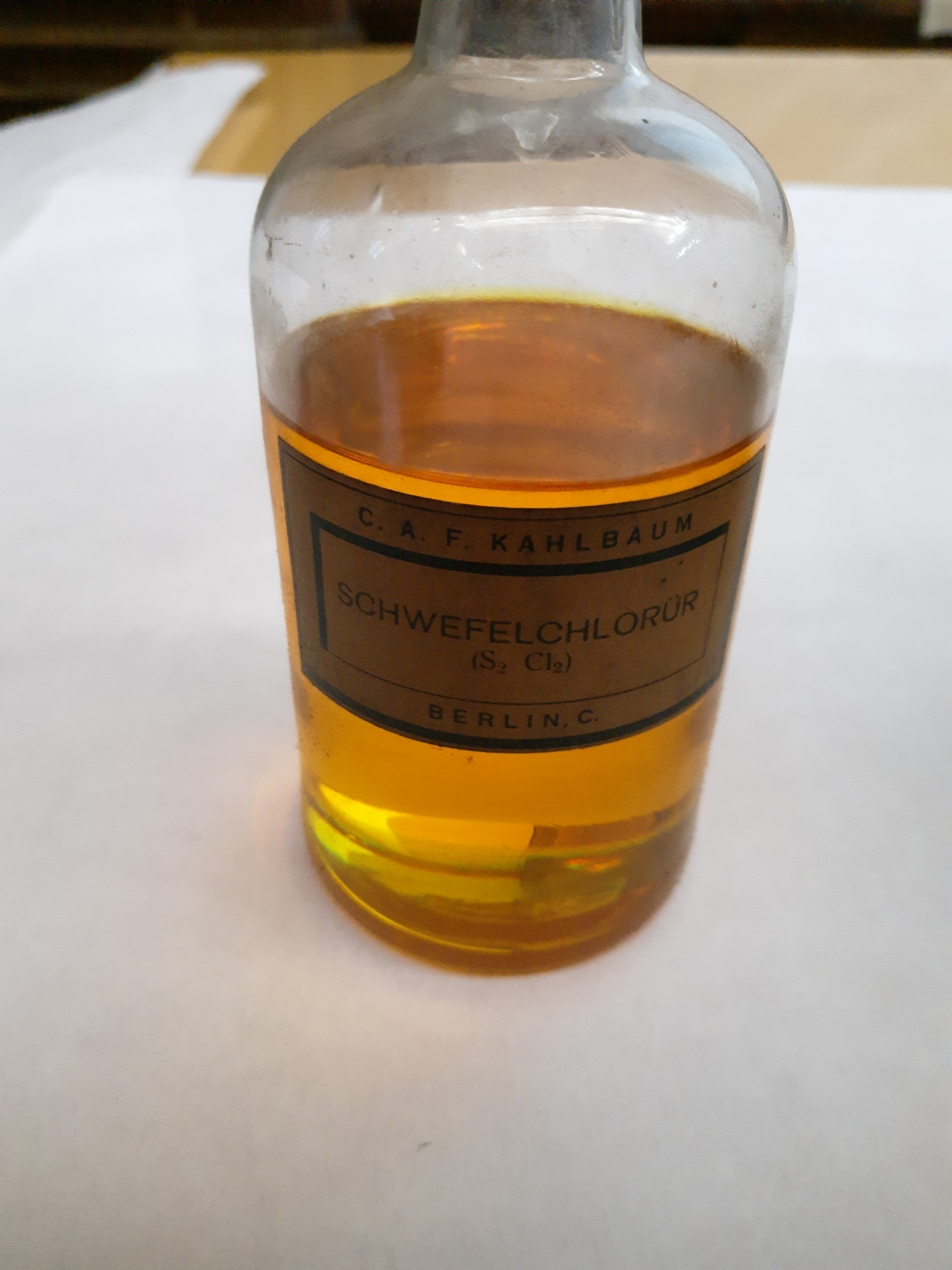

Names
- IUPAC names Disulfur dichloride Dichlorodisulfane
- Systematic IUPAC name Chlorosulfanyl thiohypochlorite
- Other names: Bis[chloridosulfur](S–S); Dimeric sulfenic chloride; Sulfur monochloride (incorrect name)

Identifiers
CAS Number	10025-67-9; 85408-26-0 (isobutenate)
3D model (JSmol)	Interactive image
ChemSpider	23192; 19158348 (isobutenate)
DrugBank	DB14647
ECHA InfoCard	100.030.021
EC Number	233-036-2
MeSH	Sulfur+monochloride
PubChem CID	24807
RTECS number	WS4300000
UNII	NJ7YR2EV0D
UN number	3390
CompTox Dashboard (EPA)	DTXSID3042427
- InChI: InChI=1S/Cl2S2/c1-3-4-2 Key: PXJJSXABGXMUSU-UHFFFAOYSA-N; InChI=1/Cl2S2/c1-3-4-2 Key: PXJJSXABGXMUSU-UHFFFAOYAK
- SMILES: ClSSCl

Properties
Chemical formula	S_{2}Cl_{2}
Molar mass	135.02 g·mol^{−1}
Appearance	Light-amber to yellow-red, oily liquid
Odor	pungent, nauseating, irritating
Density	1.688 g/cm^{3}
Melting point	−80 °C (−112 °F; 193 K)
Boiling point	137.1 °C (278.8 °F; 410.2 K)
Solubility in water	Decomposes, with loss of HCl
Solubility	Soluble in ethanol, benzene, ether, THF, chloroform, CCl_{4}
Vapor pressure	7 mmHg (20 °C)
Magnetic susceptibility (χ)	−62.2·10^{−6} cm^{3}/mol
Refractive index (n_{D})	1.658

Structure
Point group	C_{2}
Coordination geometry	2 at sulfur atoms
Molecular shape	gauche
Dipole moment	1.60 D

Hazards
- GHS labelling
Pictograms	(GHS02: Flammable) (GHS06: Toxic) (GHS07: Exclamation mark) (GHS09: Environmental hazard)
Signal word	Danger
Hazard statements	H301, H314, H332, H400
Precautionary statements	P260, P264, P270, P271, P273, P280, P301+P310, P301+P330+P331, P303+P361+P353, P304+P312, P304+P340, P305+P351+P338, P310, P312, P321, P330, P363, P391, P405, P501
NFPA 704 (fire diamond)	2 1 1
Flash point	118.5 °C (245.3 °F; 391.6 K)
Autoignition temperature	234 °C (453 °F; 507 K)
- Lethal dose or concentration (LD, LC)
LC_{Lo} (lowest published)	150 ppm (mouse, 1 min) (1 ppm = 5.52 mg/m^{3})
- NIOSH (US health exposure limits)
PEL (Permissible)	TWA 1 ppm (5.52 mg/m^{3})
REL (Recommended)	C 1 ppm (5.52 mg/m^{3})
IDLH (Immediate danger)	5 ppm (1 ppm = 5.52 mg/m^{3})
Safety data sheet (SDS)	ICSC 0958

Related compounds
Related sulfur chlorides/oxychlorides	Sulfur dichloride; Thionyl chloride; Sulfuryl chloride
Related compounds	Hydrogen disulfide; Disulfur difluoride; Disulfur dibromide; Disulfur diiodide; Dimethyl disulfide; Diphenyl disulfide; Diselenium dichloride
- Except where otherwise noted, data are given for materials in their standard state (at 25 °C [77 °F], 100 kPa). verify (what is ?) Infobox references

Disulfur dichloride (or disulphur dichloride by the British English spelling) is the inorganic compound of sulfur and chlorine with the formula S_{2}Cl_{2}. It is an amber oily liquid.

Sometimes, this compound is incorrectly named sulfur monochloride (or sulphur monochloride by the British English spelling), the name implied by its empirical formula SCl.

S_{2}Cl_{2} has the structure implied by the formula Cl−S−S−Cl, wherein the dihedral angle between the Cl^{a}−S−S and S−S−Cl^{b} planes is 85.2°. This structure is referred to as gauche, and is akin to that for H_{2}O_{2}. A rare isomer of S_{2}Cl_{2} is S=SCl_{2} (thiothionyl chloride); this isomer forms transiently when S_{2}Cl_{2} is exposed to UV-radiation (see thiosulfoxides).

== Synthesis, basic properties, reactions ==
Disulfur dichloride is a yellow liquid that fumes in moist air due to reaction with water:

16 S_{2}Cl_{2} + 16 H_{2}O → 8 SO_{2} + 32 HCl + 3 S_{8}

It is produced by partial chlorination of elemental sulfur. The reaction proceeds at usable rates at room temperature. In the laboratory, chlorine gas is led into a flask containing elemental sulfur. As disulfur dichloride is formed, the contents become a golden yellow liquid:

S_{8} + 4 Cl_{2} → 4 S_{2}Cl_{2}, ΔH = −58.2 kJ/mol

Excess chlorine produces sulfur dichloride, which causes the liquid to become less yellow and more orange-red:

S_{2}Cl_{2} + Cl_{2} ⇌ 2 SCl_{2}, ΔH = −40.6 kJ/mol

The reaction is reversible, and upon standing, SCl_{2} releases chlorine to revert to the disulfur dichloride. Disulfur dichloride has the ability to dissolve large quantities of sulfur, which reflects in part the formation of dichloropolysulfanes:

8 S_{2}Cl_{2} + n S_{8} → 8 S_{n+2}Cl_{2}

Disulfur dichloride can be purified by distillation from excess elemental sulfur.

S_{2}Cl_{2} also arises from the chlorination of CS_{2} as in the synthesis of thiophosgene or carbon tetrachloride.

=== Reactions ===
S_{2}Cl_{2} hydrolyzes to sulfur dioxide and elemental sulfur. When treated with hydrogen sulfide, polysulfanes are formed as indicated in the following idealized formula:

2 H_{2}S + S_{2}Cl_{2} → H_{2}S_{4} + 2 HCl

It reacts with ammonia to give tetrasulfur tetranitride as well as heptasulfur imide (S_{7}NH) and related S−N rings S_{8−n}(NH)_{n} (n = 2, 3).

16 NH_{3} + 6 S_{2}Cl_{2} → S_{4}N_{4} + S_{8} + 12 NH_{4}Cl

With primary and secondary alkoxide equivalents, it forms disulfoxylate esters:

2 ROH + S_{2}Cl_{2} + 2 NEt_{3} → (R–O–S)_{2} + 2 [HNEt_{3}]Cl

In principle the subsequent addition of base should give sulfoxylate esters, but typically induces disproportionation to aldehydes and alcohols instead.

== Applications ==
S_{2}Cl_{2} has been used to introduce C−S bonds. In the presence of aluminium chloride (AlCl_{3}), S_{2}Cl_{2} reacts with benzene to give diphenyl sulfide:

8 S_{2}Cl_{2} + 16 C_{6}H_{6} → 8 (C_{6}H_{5})_{2}S + 16 HCl + S_{8}

Anilines (1) react with S_{2}Cl_{2} in the presence of NaOH to give 1,2,3-benzodithiazolium chloride (2) (Herz reaction) which can be transformed into ortho-aminothiophenolates (3), these species are precursors to thioindigo dyes.

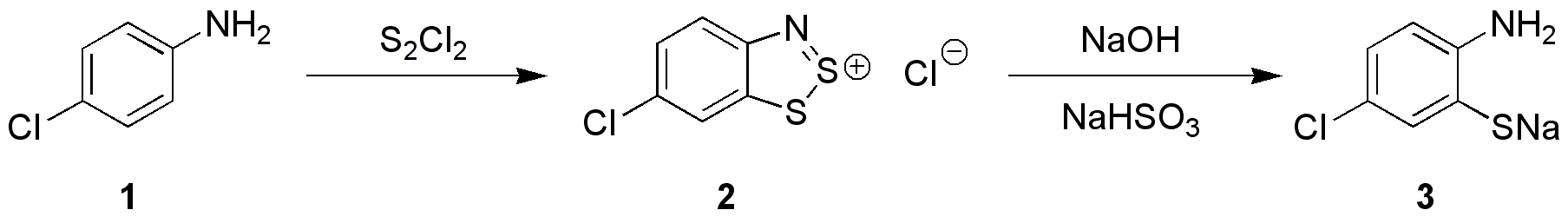

It is also used to prepare mustard gas via ethylene at 60 °C (the Levinstein process):

8 S_{2}Cl_{2} + 16 H_{2}C=CH_{2} → 8 (ClCH_{2}CH_{2})_{2}S + S_{8}

If the reaction is performed at a temperature under 30 °C, the sulfur stays in "pseudo-solution" and avoids the problems associated with the sulfur that is formed during the reaction.

Other uses of S_{2}Cl_{2} include the manufacture of sulfur dyes, insecticides, and synthetic rubbers. It is also used in cold vulcanization of rubbers, as a polymerization catalyst for vegetable oils and for hardening soft woods.

== Safety and regulation ==
S_{2}Cl_{2} can be used to produce bis(2-chloroethyl)sulfide S(CH_{2}CH_{2}Cl)_{2}, known as the mustard gas:

S_{2}Cl_{2} + 2 H_{2}C=CH_{2} → S(CH_{2}CH_{2}Cl)_{2} + "S"

Consequently, it is listed in Schedule 3 of the Chemical Weapons Convention. Facilities that produce and/or process and/or consume scheduled chemicals may be subject to control, reporting mechanisms and inspection by the Organisation for the Prohibition of Chemical Weapons.
