= Dichlorine trioxide =

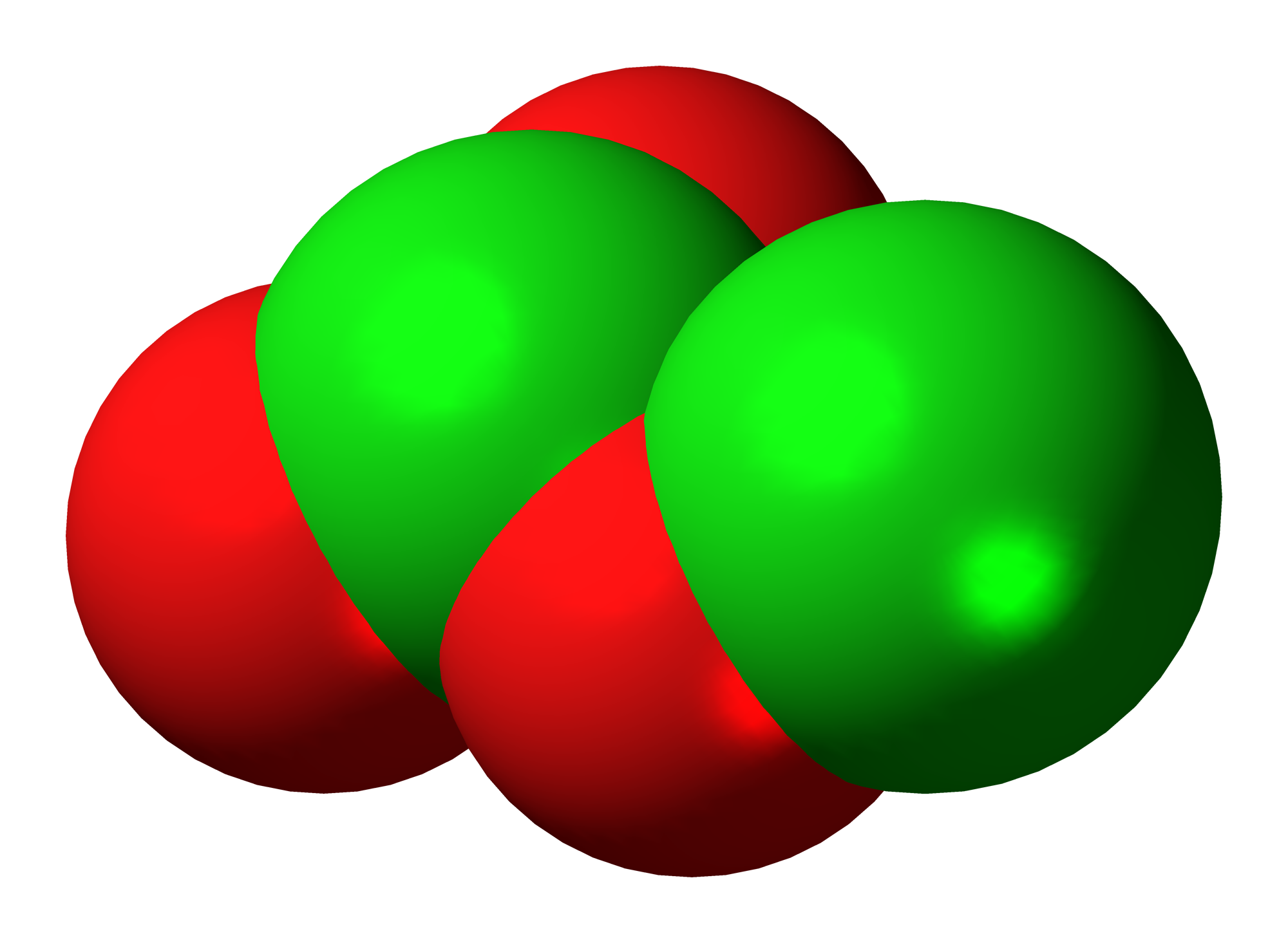

Names
- IUPAC name dichlorine trioxide
- Other names chlorine trioxide chlorine chlorate chlorine(I,V) oxide

Identifiers
CAS Number	17496-59-2
3D model (JSmol)	Interactive image
ChemSpider	11514723
PubChem CID	167661
CompTox Dashboard (EPA)	DTXSID90938601
- InChI: InChI=1S/Cl2O3/c1-5-2(3)4 Key: SAUMVKNLVQDHMJ-UHFFFAOYSA-N; InChI=1/Cl2O3/c1-5-2(3)4 Key: SAUMVKNLVQDHMJ-UHFFFAOYAS
- SMILES: ClOCl(=O)=O

Properties
Chemical formula	Cl_{2}O_{3}
Molar mass	118.903 g/mol
Appearance	dark brown solid
Melting point	explodes below 0 °C
- Except where otherwise noted, data are given for materials in their standard state (at 25 °C [77 °F], 100 kPa). verify (what is ?) Infobox references

Dichlorine trioxide, Cl_{2}O_{3}, is a chlorine oxide. It is a dark brown solid discovered in 1967 which is explosive even below 0 °C. It is formed by the low-temperature photolysis of ClO_{2} and is formed along with Cl_{2}O_{6}, Cl_{2} and O_{2}. Its structure is believed to be OCl−ClO_{2} with possible isomers such as Cl−O−ClO_{2}. The isomer having a structure of OCl–O–ClO would be the theoretical anhydride of chlorous acid.
