= Disulfur dibromide =

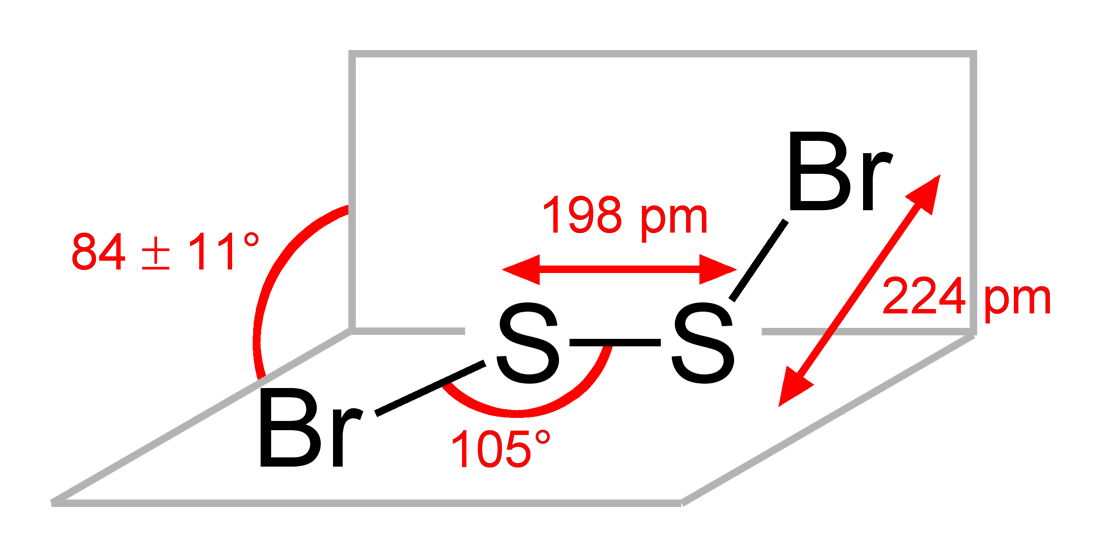
- Ball-and-stick model of sulfur dibromide

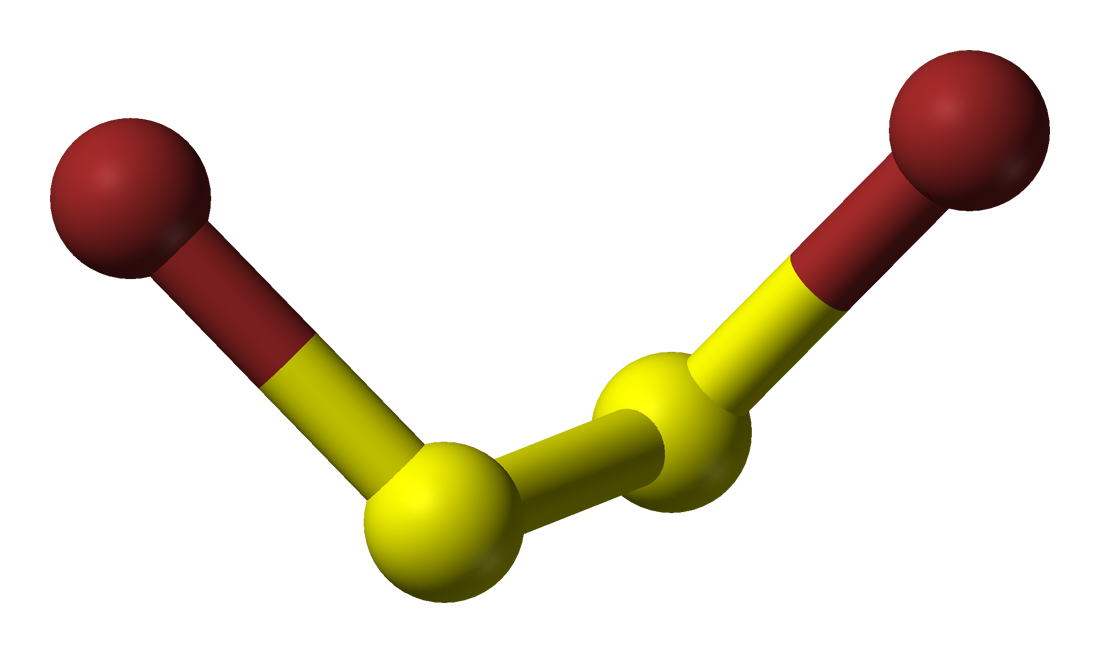
- Disulfur-dibromide-3D-vdW.png Sulfur, S; Bromine, Br

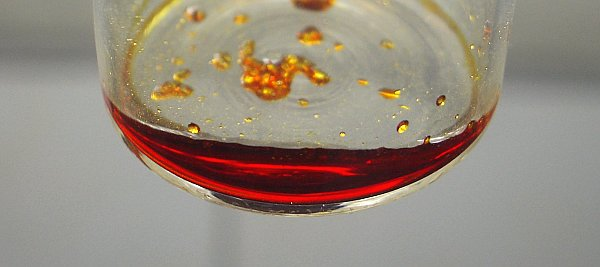

Names
- IUPAC names Disulfur dibromide Dibromodisulfane
- Systematic IUPAC name Bromosulfanyl thiohypobromite

Identifiers
CAS Number	13172-31-1
3D model (JSmol)	Interactive image
ChemSpider	109902
ECHA InfoCard	100.032.821
EC Number	236-119-1
PubChem CID	123296
UNII	L9DU8F2SHZ
CompTox Dashboard (EPA)	DTXSID00157189
- InChI: InChI=1S/Br2S2/c1-3-4-2 Key: JIRDGEGGAWJQHQ-UHFFFAOYSA-N
- SMILES: S(SBr)Br

Properties
Chemical formula	S_{2}Br_{2}
Molar mass	223.93 g·mol^{−1}
Appearance	Orange/yellow liquid
Density	2.703 g/cm^{3}
Melting point	−46 °C (−51 °F; 227 K)
Boiling point	46–48 °C (115–118 °F; 319–321 K) (0.1 mmHg)
Solubility in water	hydrolyzes

Structure
Point group	C_{2}
Coordination geometry	2 at sulfur atoms
Molecular shape	gauche

Thermochemistry
Std molar entropy (S^{⦵}_{298})	350.52 J/(mol·K)
Std enthalpy of formation (Δ_{f}H^{⦵}_{298})	30.96 kJ/mol

Hazards
- GHS labelling
Pictograms	(GHS05: Corrosive) (GHS07: Exclamation mark) (GHS09: Environmental hazard)
Signal word	Danger

Related compounds
Related	Sulfur dibromide; Thionyl bromide; Sulfuryl bromide
Related compounds	Hydrogen disulfide; Disulfur difluoride; Disulfur dichloride; Disulfur diiodide
- Except where otherwise noted, data are given for materials in their standard state (at 25 °C [77 °F], 100 kPa). verify (what is ?) Infobox references

Disulfur dibromide is the inorganic compound with the formula S_{2}Br_{2}. It is a yellow-brown liquid that fumes in air. It is prepared by direct combination of the elements and purified by vacuum distillation. Higher yields can be obtained from disulfur dichloride and 50% aqueous hydrobromic acid, but the product must be promptly removed from water, lest it hydrolyze. The compound has no particular application, unlike the related sulfur compound disulfur dichloride, although acidic alcoholysis is "an excellent synthesis of alkyl bromides."

The molecular structure is Br−S−S−Br, akin to that of disulfur dichloride (S_{2}Cl_{2}). According to electron diffraction measurements, the angle between the Br^{a}−S−S and S−S−Br^{b} planes is 84° and the Br−S−S angle is 107°. The S−S distance is 198.0 pm, circa 5.0 pm shorter than for S_{2}Cl_{2}.
