= Disulfur difluoride =

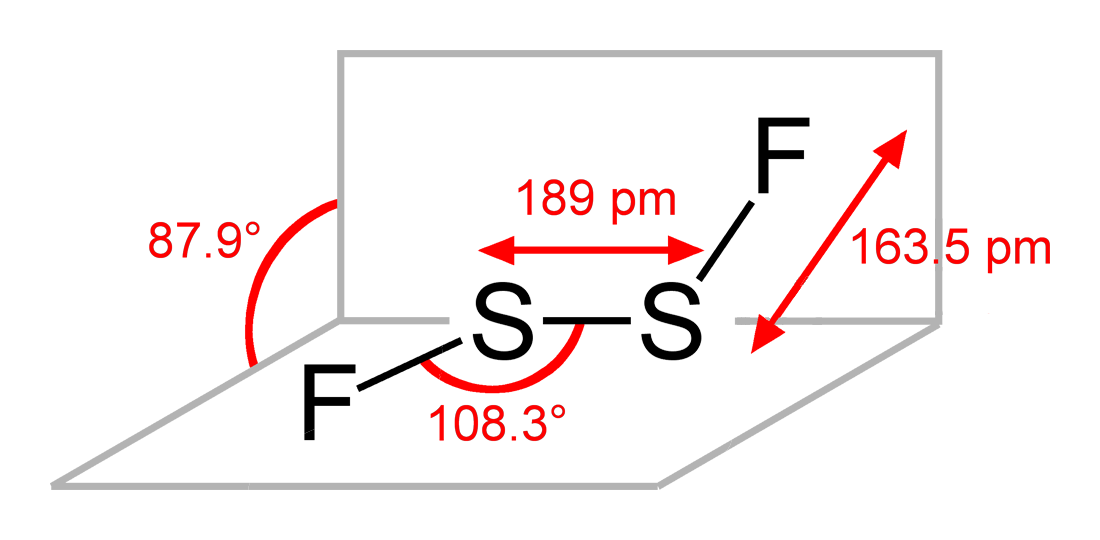

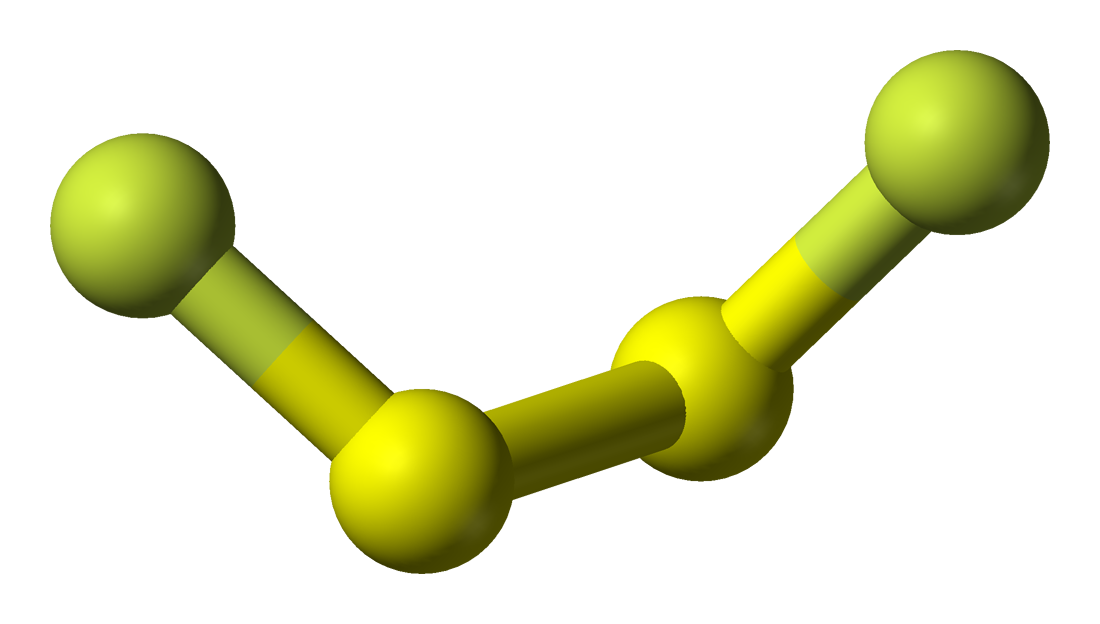
Sulfur, S;
Fluorine, F
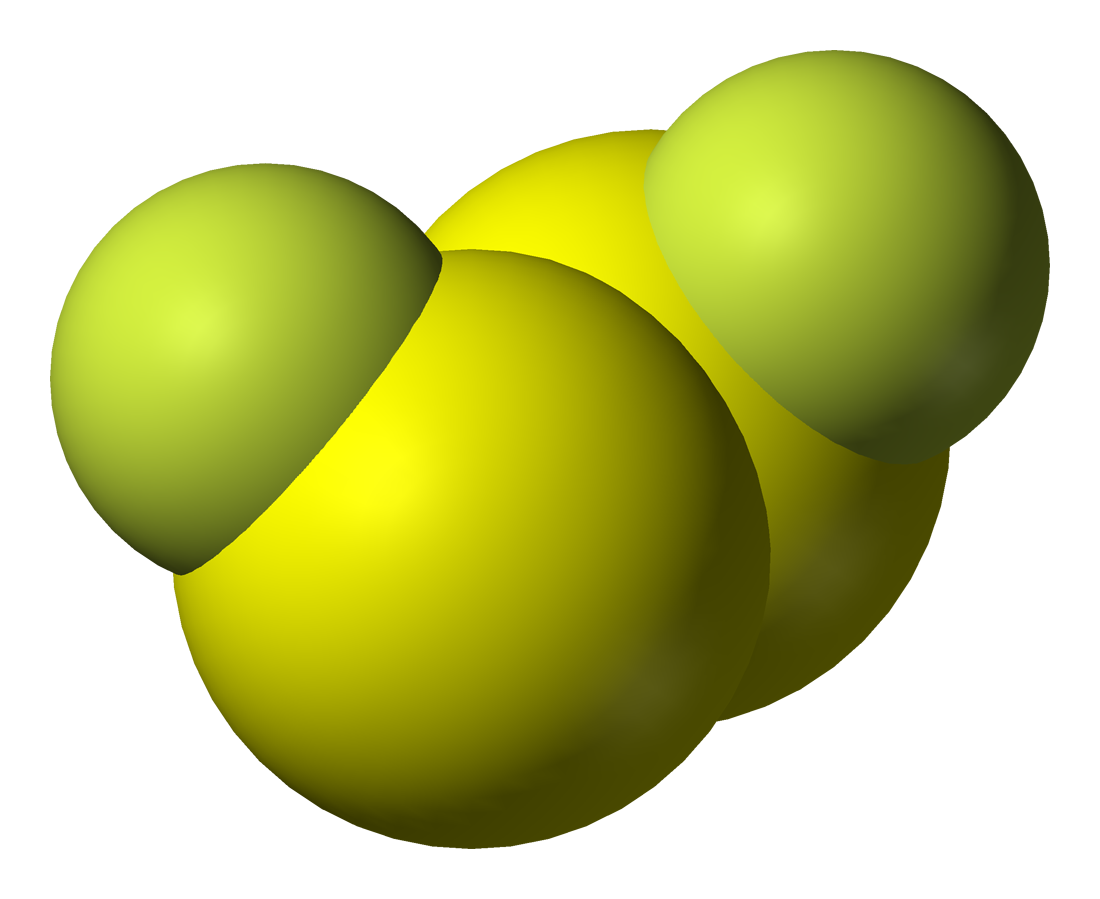

Names
- IUPAC name fluorosulfanyl thiohypofluorite
- Other names Difluorodisulfane

Identifiers
CAS Number	13709-35-8
3D model (JSmol)	Interactive image
ChemSpider	109926
PubChem CID	123323
CompTox Dashboard (EPA)	DTXSID60160058
- InChI: InChI=1S/F2S2/c1-3-4-2
- SMILES: FSSF

Properties
Chemical formula	S_{2}F_{2}
Molar mass	102.127 g/mol
Melting point	−133 °C (−207 °F; 140 K)
Boiling point	15 °C (59 °F; 288 K)

Related compounds
Related compounds	O_{2}F_{2}; H_{2}S_{2}; S_{2}Cl_{2}; S_{2}Br_{2}; S_{2}I_{2}; SF_{2}
- Except where otherwise noted, data are given for materials in their standard state (at 25 °C [77 °F], 100 kPa). Infobox references

Disulfur difluoride is an inorganic compound with the chemical formula S_{2}F_{2}. It is a halide of sulfur.

== Structure ==
Disulfur difluoride has a chain structure F−S−S−F. The angle between the F^{a}−S−S and S−S−F^{b} planes is 87.9°, while the angles of F^{a}−S−S and S−S−F^{b} are equivalent, and are equal to 108.3°. Both S−F bonds are equivalent and their length is 163.5 pm, while the length of the S−S bond is 189 pm. This structure is referred to as gauche, and is similar to H_{2}O_{2}.

There is a branched isomer of disulfur difluoride, thiothionyl fluoride, with the structure S=SF_{2}.

== Synthesis ==
Silver(II) fluoride can fluorinate sulfur in a strictly dry container at 125 °C (257 °F; 398 K), and the reaction produces FS−SF:

S_{8} + 8 AgF_{2} → 4 S_{2}F_{2} + 8 AgF

== Reactions ==
Disulfur difluoride undergoes intramolecular rearrangement in the presence of fluorides of alkali metals, yielding the isomer S=SF_{2}:

FS−SF → S=SF_{2}

- Decomposing to sulfur tetrafluoride and sulfur when heated to 180 °C:

2 S_{2}F_{2} → SF_{4} + 3 S

- Hydrolysis:

2 S_{2}F_{2} + 2 H_{2}O → SO_{2} + 3 S + 4 HF

- Reacting with sulfuric acid at 80 °C:

S_{2}F_{2} + 3 H_{2}SO_{4} → 5 SO_{2} + 2 HF + 2 H_{2}O

- Reacting with sodium hydroxide:

2 S_{2}F_{2} + 6 NaOH → Na_{2}SO_{3} + 3 S + 4 NaF + 3 H_{2}O

- Reacting with oxygen at high pressure, using nitrogen dioxide as a catalyst:

2 S_{2}F_{2} + 5 O_{2} → SOF_{4} + 3 SO_{3}
