= Sulfur dichloride =

- Structure and dimensions of the sulfur dichloride molecule

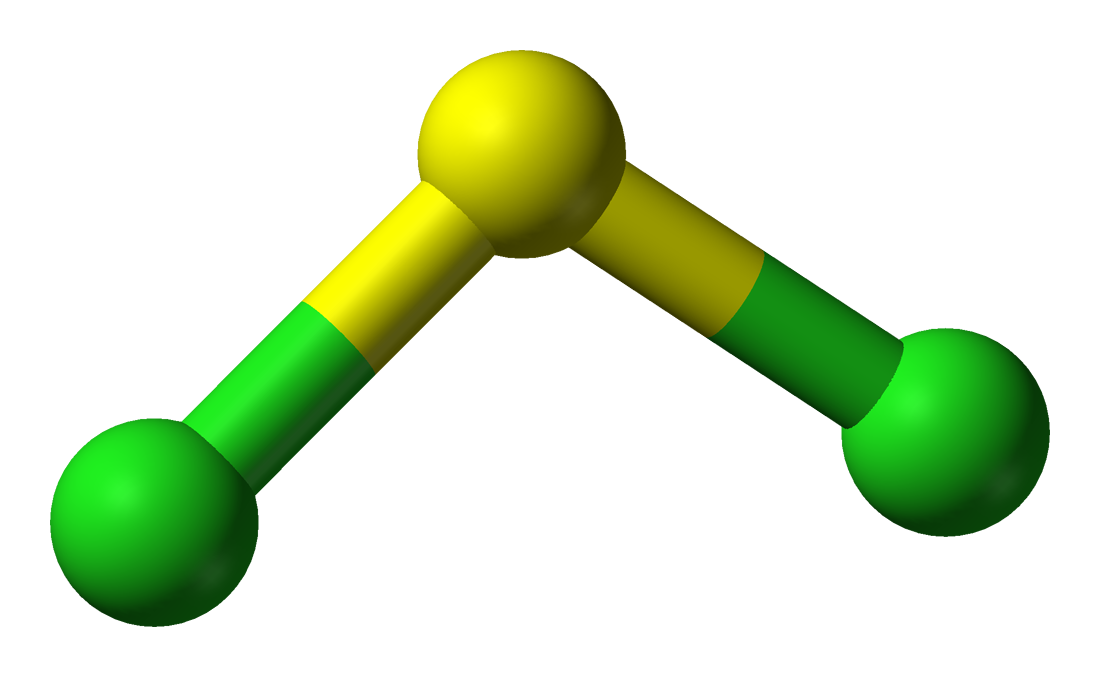
Ball-and-stick model of sulfur dichloride
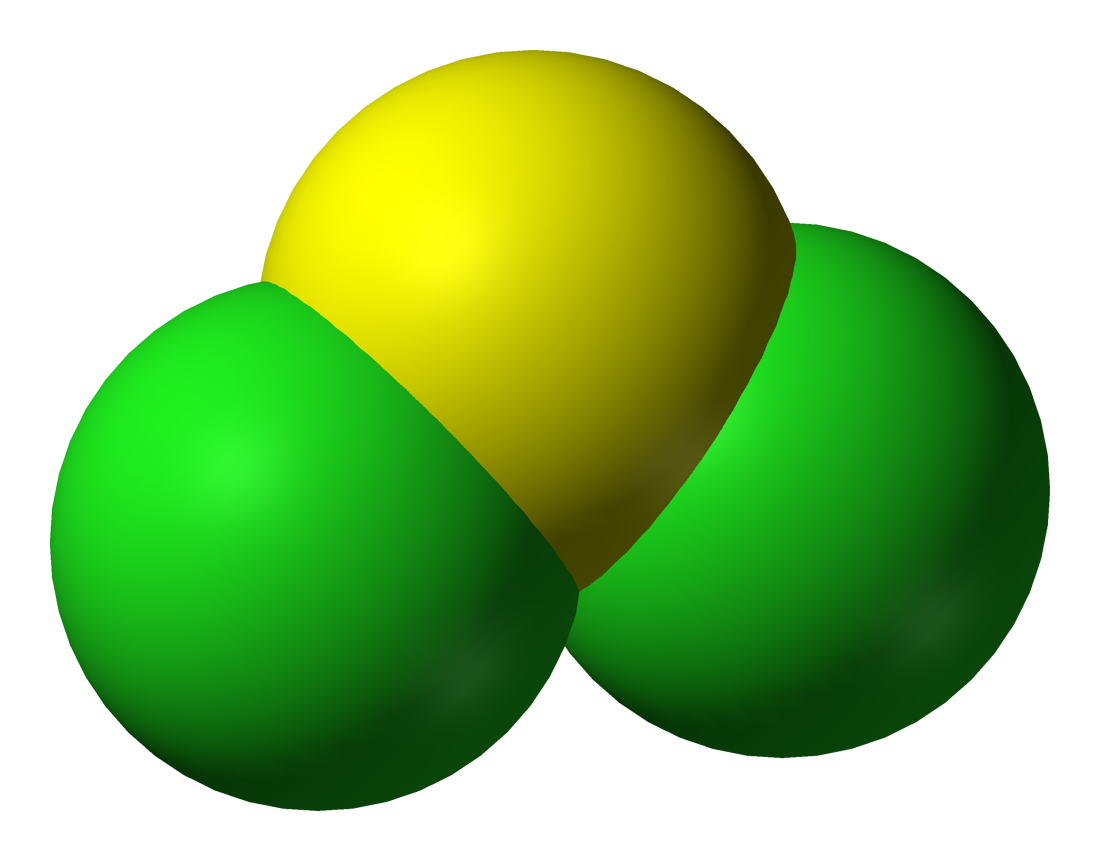
Space-filling model of sulfur dichloride

Names
- IUPAC name: Dichlorosulfane; Sulfur dichloride; Sulfur(II) chloride
- Other names: Chloro thiohypochlorite; Dichloro sulfide; Sulphur chloride

Identifiers
CAS Number	10545-99-0
3D model (JSmol)	Interactive image
ChemSpider	23682
ECHA InfoCard	100.031.014
EC Number	234-129-0
PubChem CID	25353
RTECS number	WS4500000
UNII	8Q6684WQ9H
UN number	1828
CompTox Dashboard (EPA)	DTXSID4051538
- InChI: InChI=1S/Cl2S/c1-3-2 Key: FWMUJAIKEJWSSY-UHFFFAOYSA-N; InChI=1/Cl2S/c1-3-2 Key: FWMUJAIKEJWSSY-UHFFFAOYAS
- SMILES: ClSCl

Properties
Chemical formula	SCl_{2}
Molar mass	102.96 g·mol^{−1}
Appearance	Cherry-red liquid
Odor	Pungent
Density	1.621 g/cm^{3}
Melting point	−121.0 °C (−185.8 °F; 152.2 K)
Boiling point	59 °C (138 °F; 332 K) (decomposes)
Solubility in water	Insoluble, reacts slowly
Magnetic susceptibility (χ)	−49.4·10^{−6} cm^{3}/mol
Refractive index (n_{D})	1.5570

Structure
Coordination geometry	C_{2v}
Molecular shape	Bent

Hazards
- GHS labelling
Pictograms	(GHS05: Corrosive) (GHS07: Exclamation mark) (GHS09: Environmental hazard)
Signal word	Danger
Hazard statements	H314, H335, H400
Precautionary statements	P260, P264, P271, P273, P280, P301+P330+P331, P303+P361+P353, P304+P340, P305+P351+P338, P310, P312, P321, P363, P391, P403+P233, P405, P501
NFPA 704 (fire diamond)	3 1 1
Autoignition temperature	234 °C (453 °F; 507 K)
Safety data sheet (SDS)	ICSC 1661

Related compounds
Related	Disulfur dichloride; Thionyl chloride; Sulfuryl chloride
Related compounds	Sulfur difluoride; Sulfur tetrafluoride; Sulfur hexafluoride; Disulfur dibromide
- Except where otherwise noted, data are given for materials in their standard state (at 25 °C [77 °F], 100 kPa). verify (what is ?) Infobox references

Sulfur dichloride is the chemical compound with the formula SCl_{2}. This cherry-red liquid is the simplest sulfur chloride and one of the most common, and it is used as a precursor to organosulfur compounds. It is a highly corrosive and toxic substance, and it reacts on contact with water to form chlorine-containing acids.

== Chlorination of sulfur ==
SCl_{2} is produced by the chlorination of either elemental sulfur or disulfur dichloride. The process occurs in a series of steps, some of which are:

S_{8} + 4 Cl_{2} → 4 S_{2}Cl_{2} (ΔH = −58.2 kJ/mol)
S_{2}Cl_{2} + Cl_{2} ⇌ 2 SCl_{2} (ΔH = −40.6 kJ/mol)

The addition of Cl_{2} to S_{2}Cl_{2} has been proposed to proceed via a mixed valence intermediate Cl_{3}S−SCl. SCl_{2} undergoes even further chlorination to give SCl_{4}, but this species is unstable at near room temperature. It is likely that several S_{n}Cl_{2} exist where n > 2.

Disulfur dichloride, S_{2}Cl_{2}, is a common impurity in SCl_{2}. Separation of SCl_{2} from S_{2}Cl_{2} is possible via distillation with PCl_{3} to form an azeotrope of 99% purity. Sulfur dichloride loses chlorine slowly at room temperature, converting to disulfur dichloride and eventually higher sulfanes. Pure samples may be stored in sealed glass ampules which develop a slight positive pressure of chlorine, halting the decomposition.

== Use in chemical synthesis ==
SCl_{2} is used in organic synthesis. It adds to alkenes to give chloride-substituted thioethers. Illustrative is its addition to 1,5-cyclooctadiene to give a bicyclic thioether A well tested method for the production of the mustard gas bis(2-chloroethyl)sulfide, is the addition of ethylene to sulfur dichloride:

SCl_{2} + 2 C_{2}H_{4} → (ClC_{2}H_{4})_{2}S

SCl_{2} is also a precursor to several inorganic sulfur compounds. Treatment with fluoride salts gives SF_{4} via the decomposition of the intermediate sulfur difluoride. With H_{2}S, SCl_{2} reacts to give "lower" sulfanes such as S_{3}H_{2}. SO_{3} oxidizes SCl_{2} to SOCl_{2}.

Reaction with ammonia affords sulfur nitrides related to S_{4}N_{4}. Treatment of SCl_{2} with primary amines gives sulfur diimides. One example is di-t-butylsulfurdiimide.

Reaction with alcohols gives sulfoxylate esters.

== Safety considerations ==
SCl_{2} hydrolyzes with release of HCl. Old samples contain Cl_{2}.
