= Sulfur tetrafluoride =

- Structural formula of sulfur tetrafluoride, showing dimernsions

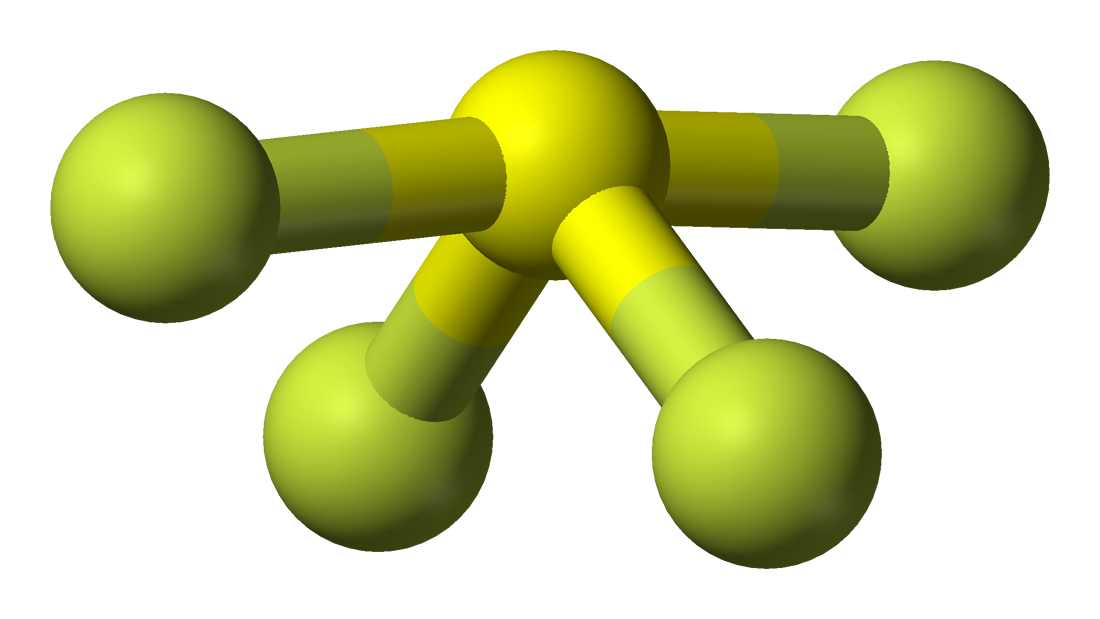
Ball-and-stick model of sulfur tetrafluoride
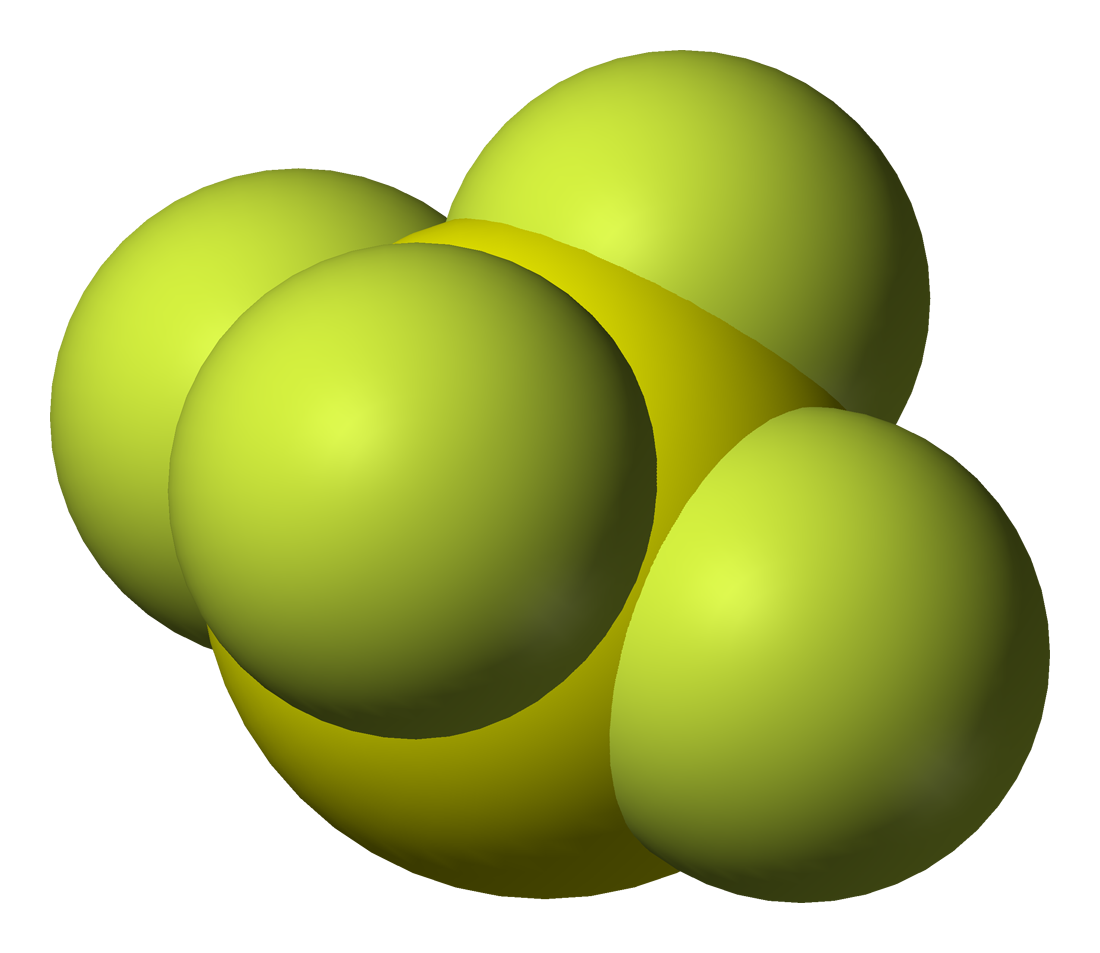
Space-filling model of sulfur tetrafluoride

Names
- IUPAC name Sulfur(IV) fluoride
- Other names Sulfur tetrafluoride

Identifiers
CAS Number	7783-60-0
3D model (JSmol)	Interactive image
ChEBI	CHEBI:30495
ChemSpider	22961
ECHA InfoCard	100.029.103
PubChem CID	24555
RTECS number	WT4800000
UNII	F4P8J39GOF
UN number	2418
CompTox Dashboard (EPA)	DTXSID40893074
- InChI: InChI=1S/F4S/c1-5(2,3)4 Key: QHMQWEPBXSHHLH-UHFFFAOYSA-N; InChI=1/F4S/c1-5(2,3)4 Key: QHMQWEPBXSHHLH-UHFFFAOYAT
- SMILES: FS(F)(F)F

Properties
Chemical formula	SF_{4}
Molar mass	108.07 g/mol
Appearance	colorless gas
Density	1.95 g/cm^{3}, −78 °C
Melting point	−121.0 °C
Boiling point	−38 °C
Solubility in water	reacts
Vapor pressure	10.5 atm (22 °C)

Structure
Molecular shape	Seesaw (C_{2v})
Dipole moment	0.632 D

Hazards
- Occupational safety and health (OHS/OSH)
Main hazards	highly reactive and toxic gas
NFPA 704 (fire diamond)	3 0 2 W
- NIOSH (US health exposure limits)
PEL (Permissible)	none
REL (Recommended)	C 0.1 ppm (0.4 mg/m^{3})
IDLH (Immediate danger)	N.D.
Safety data sheet (SDS)	ICSC 1456

Related compounds
Other anions	Sulfur dichloride Disulfur dibromide Sulfur trifluoride
Other cations	Oxygen difluoride Selenium tetrafluoride Tellurium tetrafluoride
Related sulfur fluorides	Disulfur difluoride Sulfur difluoride Disulfur decafluoride Sulfur hexafluoride
Related compounds	Thionyl fluoride
- Except where otherwise noted, data are given for materials in their standard state (at 25 °C [77 °F], 100 kPa). verify (what is ?) Infobox references

Sulfur tetrafluoride is a chemical compound with the formula SF_{4}. It is a colorless corrosive gas that releases dangerous hydrogen fluoride gas upon exposure to water or moisture. Sulfur tetrafluoride is a useful reagent for the preparation of organofluorine compounds, some of which are important in the pharmaceutical and specialty chemical industries.

== Structure ==
Sulfur in SF_{4} is in the +4 oxidation state, with one lone pair of electrons. The atoms in SF_{4} are arranged in a see-saw shape, with the sulfur atom at the center. One of the three equatorial positions is occupied by a nonbonding lone pair of electrons. Consequently, the molecule has two distinct types of F ligands, two axial and two equatorial. The relevant bond distances are S–F_{ax} = 164.3 pm and S–F_{eq} = 154.2 pm. It is typical for the axial ligands in hypervalent molecules to be bonded less strongly.

The ^{19}F NMR spectrum of SF_{4} reveals only one signal, which indicates that the axial and equatorial F atom positions rapidly interconvert via pseudorotation.

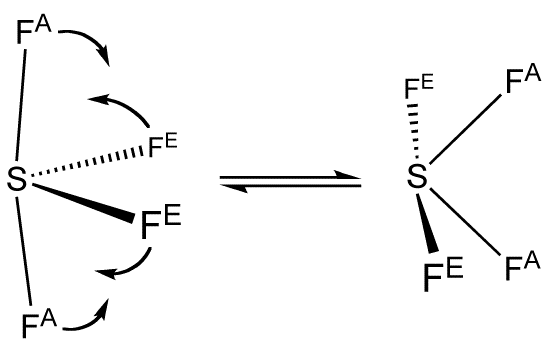
Intramolecular dynamic equilibration of SF_{4}.

== Synthesis and manufacturing ==
At the laboratory scale, sulfur tetrafluoride is prepared from elemental sulfur and cobaltic fluoride

S + 4CoF_{3} → SF_{4} + 4CoF_{2}

SF_{4} is industrially produced by the reaction of SCl_{2} and NaF with acetonitrile as a catalyst

3 SCl_{2} + 4 NaF → SF_{4} + S_{2}Cl_{2} + 4 NaCl

At higher temperatures (e.g. 225–450 °C), the solvent is superfluous. Moreover, sulfur dichloride may be replaced by elemental sulfur (S) and chlorine (Cl_{2}).

A low-temperature (e.g. 20–86 °C) alternative to the chlorinative process above uses liquid bromine (Br_{2}) as oxidant and solvent:

S(s) + 2 Br_{2}(l; excess) + 4KF(s) → SF_{4}↑ + 4 KBr(brom)

== Use in synthesis of organofluorine compounds ==
In organic synthesis, SF_{4} is used to convert COH and C=O groups into CF and CF_{2} groups, respectively. The efficiency of these conversions are highly variable.

In the laboratory, the use of SF_{4} has been superseded by the safer and more easily handled diethylaminosulfur trifluoride, (C_{2}H_{5})_{2}NSF_{3}, "DAST": This reagent is prepared from SF_{4}:

SF_{4} + (CH_{3})_{3}SiN(C_{2}H_{5})_{2} → (C_{2}H_{5})_{2}NSF_{3} + (CH_{3})_{3}SiF

== Other reactions ==
Sulfur chloride pentafluoride (SF_{5}Cl), a useful source of the SF_{5} group, is prepared from SF_{4}.

SF_{4} + Cl_{2} + CsF → SF_{5}Cl + CsCl

Hydrolysis of SF_{4} gives sulfur dioxide:

SF_{4} + 2 H_{2}O → SO_{2} + 4 HF

This reaction proceeds via the intermediacy of thionyl fluoride, which usually does not interfere with the use of SF_{4} as a reagent.

When amines are treated with SF_{4} and a base, aminosulfur difluorides result.

== Toxicity ==
SF_{4} reacts inside the lungs with moisture, forming sulfur dioxide and hydrogen fluoride which forms highly toxic and corrosive hydrofluoric acid.
