= Sulfur difluoride =

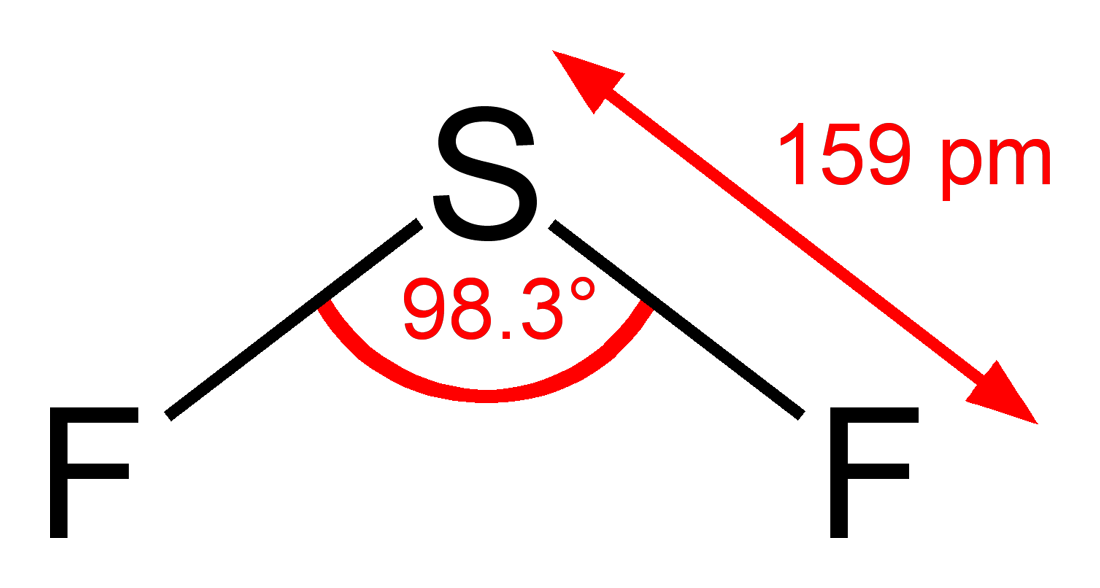

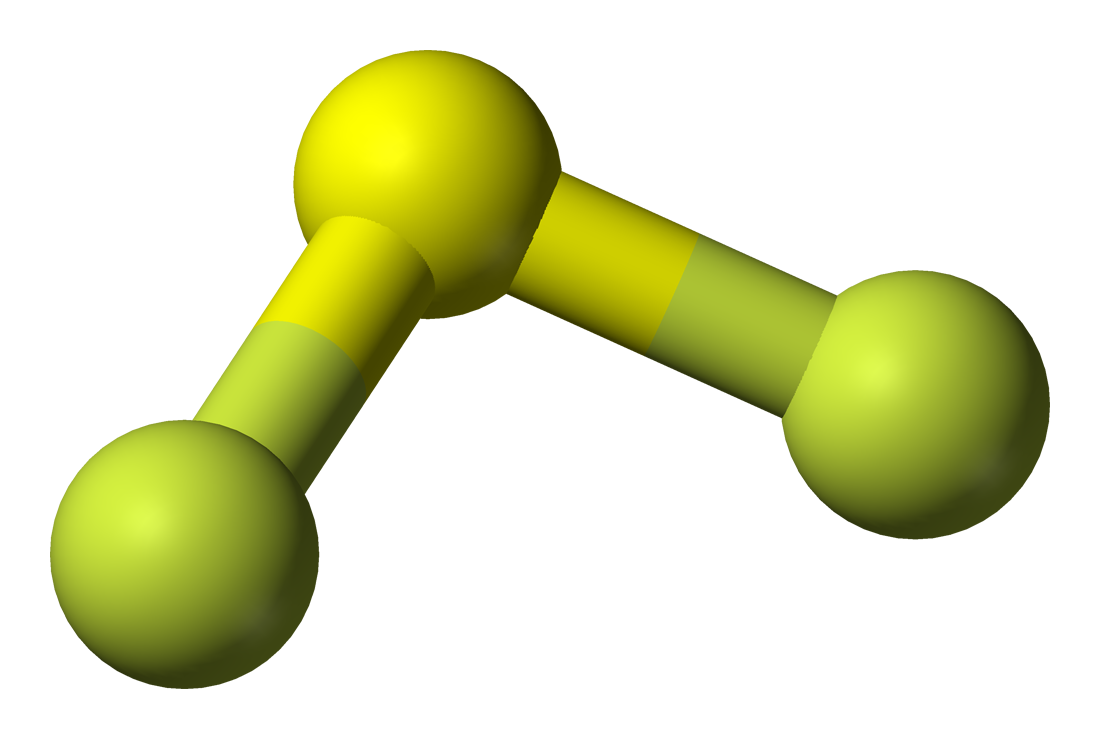

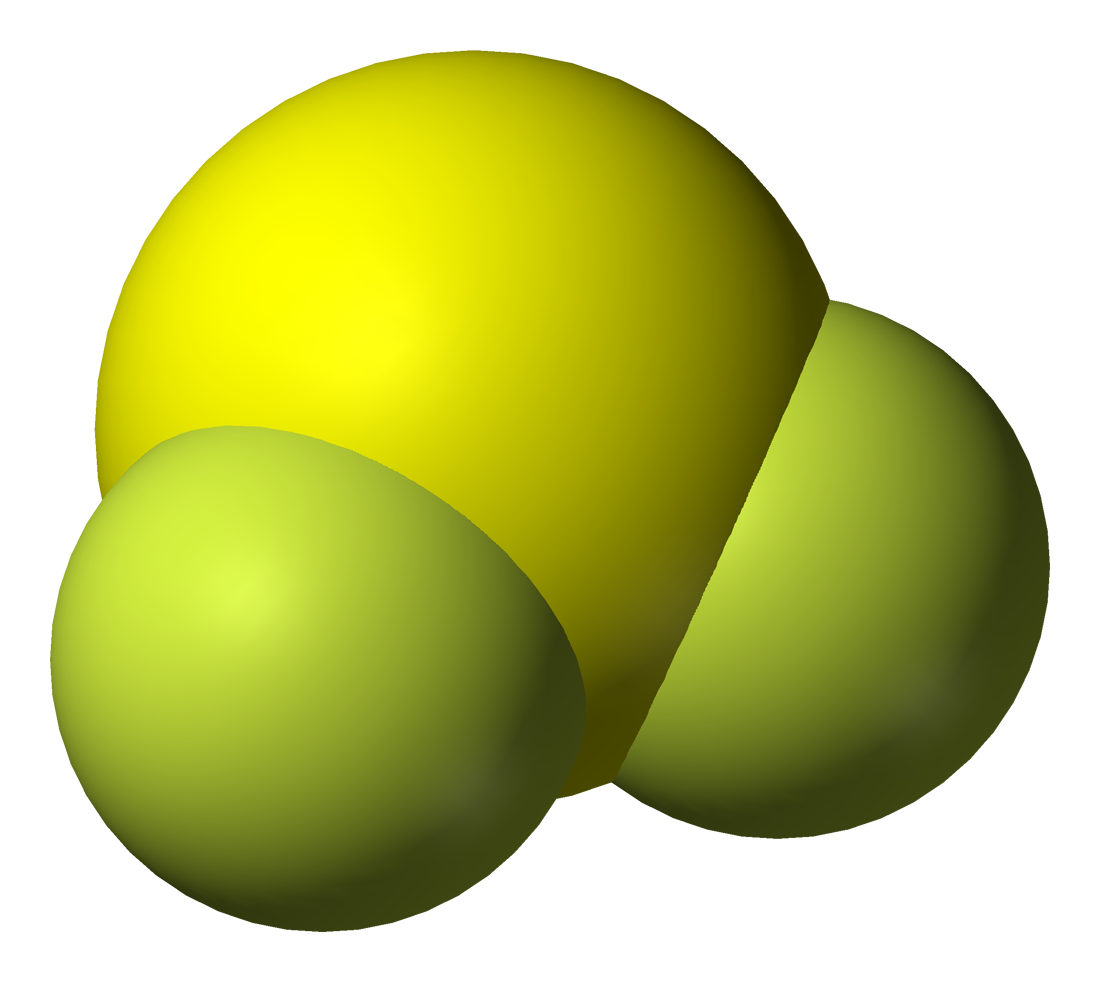

Names
- IUPAC name sulfoxylic difluoride

Identifiers
CAS Number	13814-25-0
3D model (JSmol)	Interactive image
ChemSpider	123122
PubChem CID	139605
CompTox Dashboard (EPA)	DTXSID30160500
- InChI: InChI=1S/F2S/c1-3-2
- SMILES: FSF

Properties
Chemical formula	SF_{2}
Molar mass	70.062 g/mol
- Except where otherwise noted, data are given for materials in their standard state (at 25 °C [77 °F], 100 kPa). Infobox references

Sulfur difluoride is an inorganic compound with the chemical formula SF_{2}. It can be generated by the reaction of sulfur dichloride and potassium fluoride or mercury(II) fluoride at low pressures:

SCl_{2} + 2 KF → SF_{2} + 2 KCl
SCl_{2} + HgF_{2} → SF_{2} + HgCl_{2}

The F−S−F bond angle is 98°, and the length of S−F bond is 159 pm. The compound is highly unstable, dimerising to FSSF_{3}. This unsymmetrical isomer of S_{2}F_{4} is proposed to arise via insertion of SF_{2} into the S−F bond of a second molecule SF_{2}:

It can also be formed from oxygen difluoride and hydrogen sulfide:

OF_{2} + H_{2}S → SF_{2} + H_{2}O
