= Sulfur mononitride =

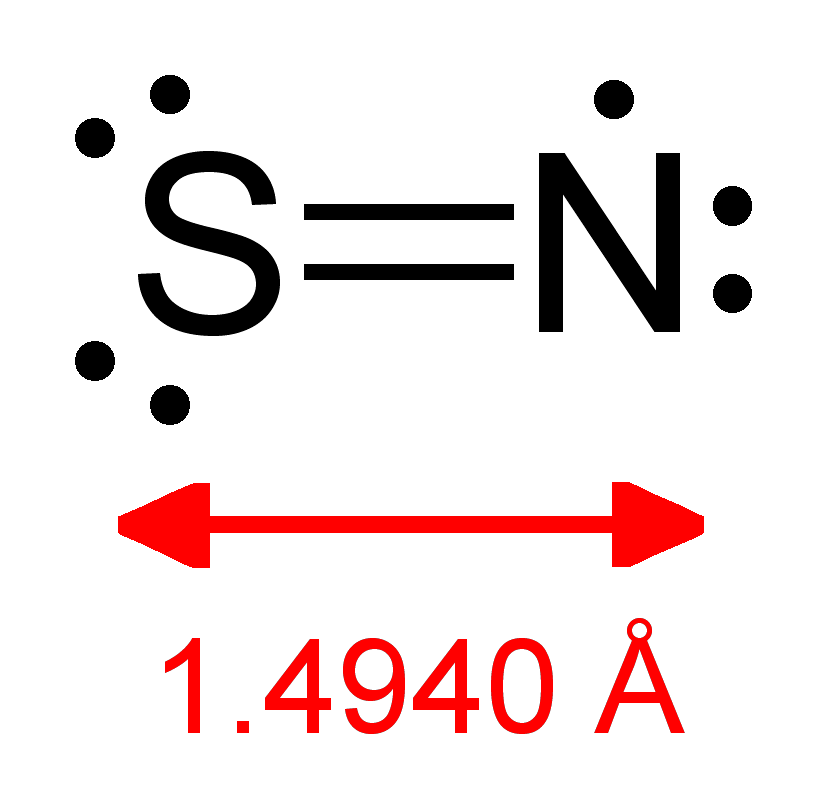
Wireframe model of sulfur mononitride
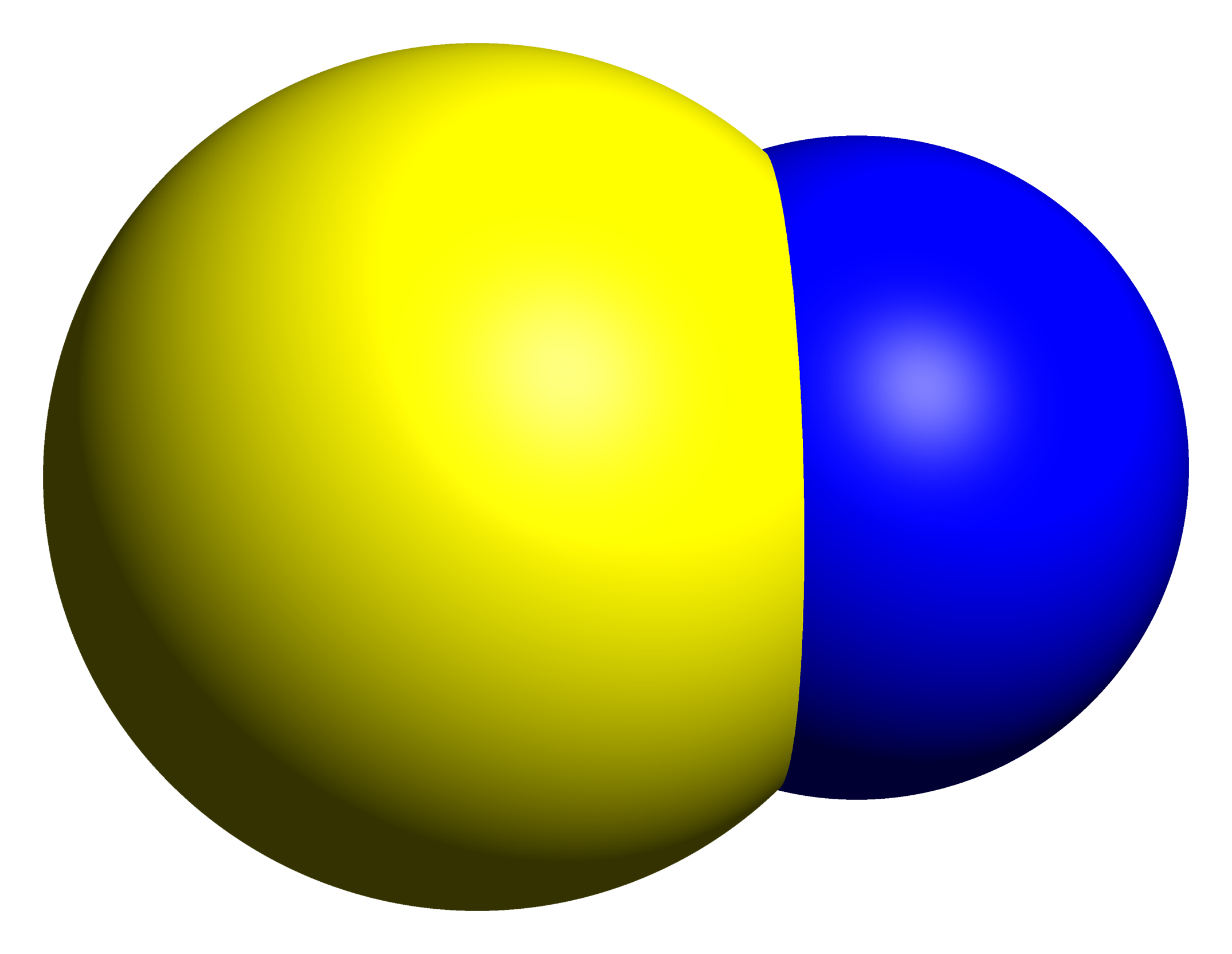
Spacefill model of sulfur mononitride

Names
- Preferred IUPAC name sulfur mononitride
- Systematic IUPAC name Azaniumylsulfanidylidyne
- Other names: Aminiosulfanidylidyne; Thionitroso radical; Thionitrosyl radical

Identifiers
CAS Number	12033-56-6
3D model (JSmol)	Interactive image
Abbreviations	(NS)(.)
ChEBI	CHEBI:29451
ChemSpider	4576119
Gmelin Reference	660
PubChem CID	5463441
CompTox Dashboard (EPA)	DTXSID50923331
- InChI: InChI=1S/H3NS/c1-2/h1H3 Key: ZGSDJMADBJCNPN-UHFFFAOYSA-N
- SMILES: [N+][S-]

Properties
Chemical formula	NS
Molar mass	46.07 g·mol^{−1}
- Except where otherwise noted, data are given for materials in their standard state (at 25 °C [77 °F], 100 kPa). Infobox references

Sulfur mononitride is an inorganic compound with the molecular formula SN. It is the sulfur analogue of and isoelectronic to the radical nitric oxide, NO. It was initially detected in 1975, in outer space in giant molecular clouds and later the coma of comets. This spurred further laboratory studies of the compound. Synthetically, it is produced by electric discharge in mixtures of nitrogen and sulfur compounds, or combustion in the gas phase and by photolysis in solution.

== Synthesis ==
The NS radical is a highly transient species, with a lifetime on the order of milliseconds, but it can be observed spectroscopically over short periods of time through several methods of generation. NS is too reactive to isolate as a solid or liquid, and has only been prepared as a vapor in low pressure or low-temperature matrices due to its tendency to rapidly oligomerize to more stable, diamagnetic species.

=== Electric discharge ===
Transmission of electric discharge through a glass tube with quartz windows containing a mixture of nitrogen and sulfur vapor (rigorously free of oxygen) results in the spectrum of emitted light gaining bands consistent with the formation of NS.

Passing a mixture of gaseous N_{2} and S_{2}Cl_{2} through the side arm of an absorption cell undergoing microwave discharge produces NS. Infrared diode laser spectroscopy taken using this method allowed for derivation of the equilibrium rotational constant, and therefore calculation of the equilibrium bond length as 1.4940 Å.

With low pressure microwave discharge of elemental nitrogen and sulfur, followed by low temperature trapping in argon matrices, one obtains a mixture of products including NS, NNS, SNS, and NSS. By adding excess sulfur, SSNS is also produced.

=== Sulfur- and nitrogen-doped flames ===
Methane was premixed with fuel in the form of either O_{2}, N_{2}O, or air and burned at ambient pressure. The source of nitrogen was introduced by addition of 1–5 mol% NH_{3} gas and sulfur by 0.01–0.5 mol% H_{2}S or SF_{6} gas. A steady state concentration of NS within the flame front is observed by laser-induced fluorescence (LIF) spectrum.

=== Photolysis ===
The NS radical was detected by LIF spectrum as the product of photolysis of tetranitrogen tetrasulfide (N_{4}S_{4}) gas by a 248 nm laser.

Aerated solutions of Cr(CH_{3}CN)_{5}(NS)^{2+} are highly photoactive and prone to rapid decomposition. Deaerated solutions of Cr(CH_{3}CN)_{5}(NS)^{2+} in acetonitrile are stable as long as they are kept in the dark. Continuous photolysis using 366 nm light is slow, while using a 355 nm pulsed laser results in faster labilization of NS.

== Reactivity ==
=== Oligomerization ===
Evidence suggests that NS can react with itself to reach N_{2}S_{2}, N_{4}S_{4}, and polymers of the form (NS)_{x}. (NS)_{x} forms from polymerization of cyclo-N_{2}S_{2}.

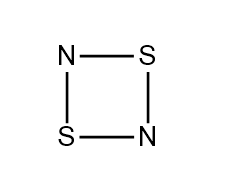
cyclo-N_{2}S_{2}.

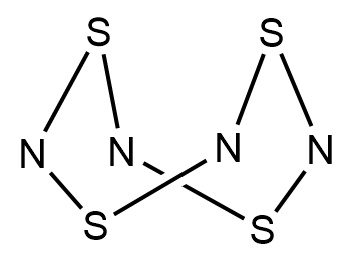
N_{4}S_{4}.

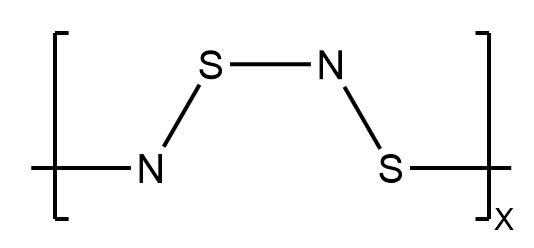
(NS)_{x} polymer.

Trans-NSSN results from direct dimerization of NS.

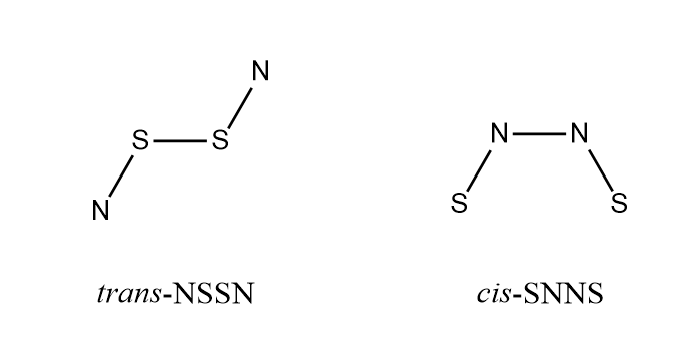

The decay time associated with these reactions is on the order of 1-3 ms.

N_{3}S_{3} has been observed through photoelectron spectroscopy of vapors of the (SN)_{x}, polymer, but has not yet been characterized further. Attempts to produce N_{3}S_{3} by oxidation of [PPN][S_{3}N_{3}] were unsuccessful. It is theorized that rapid dimerization to (N_{3}S_{3})_{2} will disproportionate irreversibly to N_{4}S_{4} and N_{2}S_{2}.

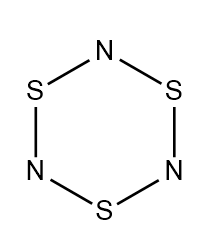
N_{3}S_{3}.

=== Combustion ===
NS does not react with NO or O_{2} at ambient temperatures. Addition of NO_{2} induces rapid, first-order decay with a rate constant (295 K) of k = (2.54 ± 0.12) × 10^{−11} cm^{3} molecules^{−1} s^{−1}. This reaction is proposed to proceed through various intermediates, ultimately reaching final products of N_{2} and SO_{2}.

== Metal-thionitrosyl complexes ==
As a ligand, NS acts as a σ-donor and π-acceptor, forming metal-thionitrosyl complexes. Transition-metal thionitrosyl complexes have been prepared by the following procedures:

- Sulfur transfer to metal nitrido complexes. For example, reflux of (Ph_{4}P)[OsNCl_{4}] and (Ph_{4}P)NCS yields green-brown solid [Ph_{4}P]_{2}[Os(NS)(NCS)_{5}]. However, "this route is not readily generalised".
- Reaction of trithiazyltrichloride with transition metal complexes, e.g.:

NSCl_{3} + OsCl_{3} → [Os(NS)Cl_{3}]

- Halide abstraction from coordinated thiazyl complexes, e.g.:

[(η^{5}_{−}C_{5}H_{5})Cr(NO)_{2}(NSF)]-[AsF_{6}] + AsF_{5} → [(η^{5}-C_{5}H_{5})Cr(NO)_{2}(NS)]-[AsF_{6}]_{2}

- Reaction of NS^{+} salts with transition metal complexes, e.g.:

NS^{+}SbF_{6}^{−} + [M(CO)_{5}Br] → [M(CO)_{5}(NS)]^{2+}, M=Mn, Re
NS^{+}AsF_{6}^{−} + [(η^{5}-C_{5}H_{5})Fe(CO)_{2}(SO_{2})]^{+} → [(η^{5}-C_{5}H_{5})Fe(CO)_{2}(NS)][AsF_{6}]_{2}

The NS^{+} salts themselves can be made from thiazyl chloride and silver hexafluorophosphate.

- Historically, tetrasulfur tetranitride was believed to react with metal halides or nitrides to give thionitrosyl complexes. However, the reaction only proceeds in protonic solvents, and in fact only breaks one bond to form the bidentate -S-N-S-NH- ligand.

From X-ray crystallography of many of such metal-thionitrosyl complexes, one can observe that the M-N-S bond angle is nearly linear, suggesting sp hybridization about N. Short M-N distances and long N-S distances reflect the resonance structure of M=N=S having greater contribution than M-N≡S.

Typical v(NS) IR stretching frequencies are approximately 1065 cm^{−1} for low-valent transition metal complexes and around 1390 cm^{−1} in the high valent cases, whereas the free gas-phase radical exhibits a 1204 cm^{−1} signal.

=== NS transfer ===
When a spin-trapping agent, such as Fe(S_{2}CNEt_{2})_{2} is present during the photolysis of Cr(CH_{3}CN)_{5}(NS)^{2+}, new S=1/2 EPR bands are observed, attributed to the formation of Fe(S_{2}CNEt_{2})_{2}(NS), and the signal from Cr(CH_{3}CN)_{5}(NS)^{2+} disappears. This suggests that the NS radical has transferred from the chromium complex to the iron complex.

An example of an NS in situ transfer is the following reaction, which needs light to occur:

(Cr(CH_{3}CN)_{5}(NS)^{2+} + Fe(S_{2}CNEt_{2}) + CH_{3}CN → Cr(CH_{3}CN)^{2+}_{6} + Fe(S_{2}CNEt_{2})_{2}(NS)

This was particularly significant as it was the first controlled and well-characterized reactivity of NS in solution. Further, it showed the potential for similar reactivity in known reactions with NO, such as use of this iron dithiocarbamate complex.

== Bonding ==
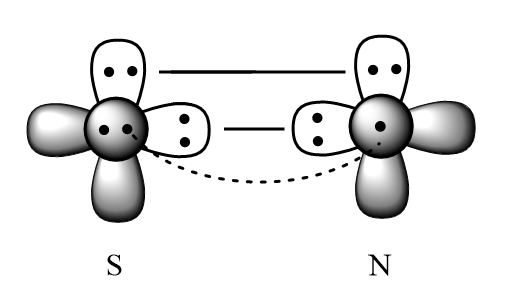
Model of bonding in the NS radical

The valence electrons of this compound match those of nitric oxide. Sulfur mononitride can be described as some average of a set of resonance structures. The singly bonded structure (first resonance structure shown) has little contribution. The formal bond order is considered to be 2.5.

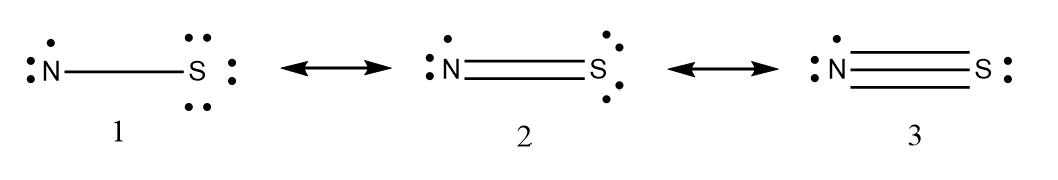
Resonance structures of NS.

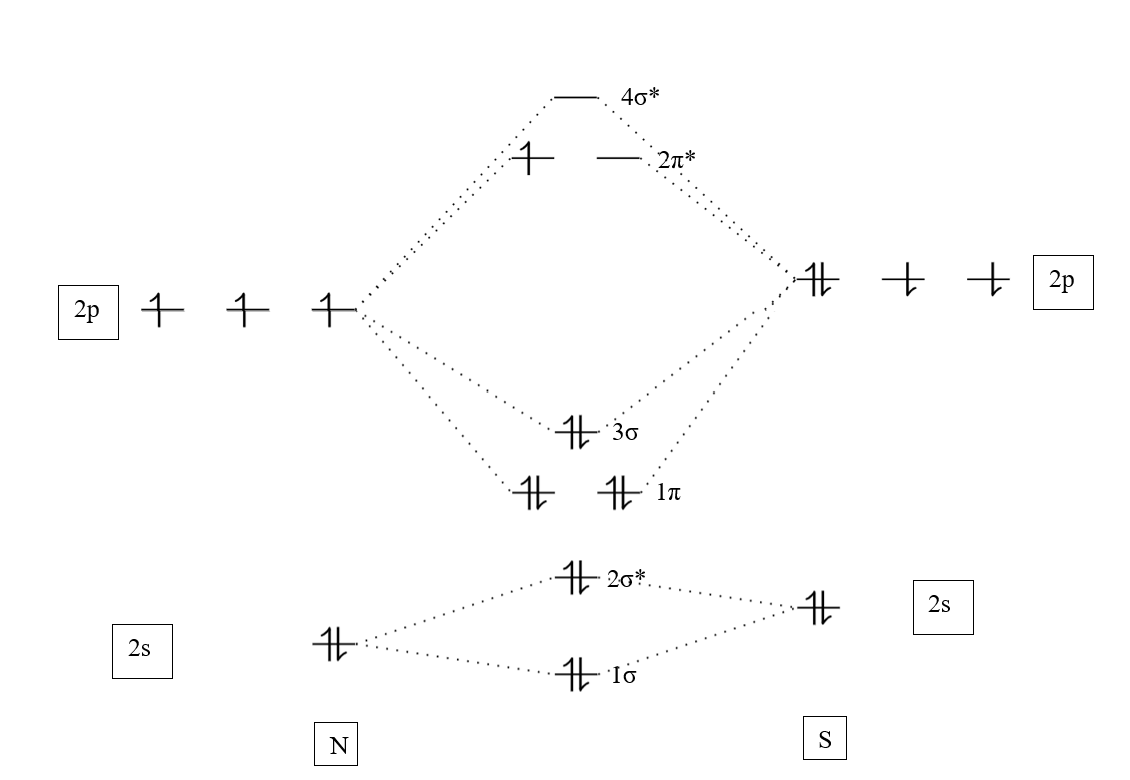
Molecular orbital diagram of NS.

=== Versus NO ===
The decreasing electronegativity with increasingly heavy chalcogenides leads to a reversal of the dipole. In NO, oxygen is the more electronegative element. In NS, nitrogen is more electronegative. The NS radical is significantly more unstable and prone to catenation than NO.

Comparison of physical properties of nitrogen chalcogenide radicals
	NO	NS	NSe
△_{f}H°, kJ·mol^{−1}	+90.24	+283.4	-
△_{f}G°, kJ·mol^{−1}	+86.57	+217.2	-
S° 273, J/deg	+207.5/273 K	+222.093/298 K	-
B.D.E.	627.6	463±24	370 Cal
d(N-E), Å	1.1517	1.4938	1.6634
Bond order	2.5	2.5	2.5

== In astronomy ==
Molecules in distant astronomical regions can be identified based on their unique rotational transitions, of which the corresponding microwave frequencies are detectable by antennae on Earth. The presence of interstellar sulfur mononitride was first reported in 1975 by back to back letters published in the Astrophysical Journal.

Interstellar NS was first identified in the giant molecular cloud Sagittarius B2 (Sgr B2). Its presence was reported in two concurrent articles. Measurements conducted with the National Radio Astronomy Observatory telescope at Kitt Peak, Arizona, picked up millimeter-wavelength radiation in Sgr B2 attributed to c-state transitions of NS in the ^{2}Π_{1/2} state from J=5/2 to J=3/2 at 115.16 GHz. This assignment was confirmed by measurements conducted at University of Texas Millimeter Wave Observatory on Mount Locke as well, demonstrating J=5/2 to J=3/2 c-state and d-state transitions at 115.16 GHz and 115.6 GHz, respectively. Hyperfine interactions arise from ^{14}N magnetic and electric-quadrupole moments.

NS has been detected in regions responsible for forming massive stars, such as giant molecular clouds like Sg B2 and cold, dark clouds such as L134N and TMC-1. One survey found NS in 12 out of 14 GMC studied, additionally observing the J=7/2 to J=5/2 and J=3/2 to J=1/2 transitions at 161 and 69 GHz, respectively. The abundance of NS in these regions was approximated based on the ratio of observed to intrinsic hyperfine line strengths as well as modeling using a statistical equilibrium program, finding low abundance in all except the Orion molecular cloud.

NS was also observed in the coma of the comets Hyakutake and Hale-Bopp. It is believed that the observed abundance is higher than gas-phase, ion-molecule models due to an unidentified species X-NS photo-dissociating to release NS.

== Industrial applications ==
Detection of NS at steady state concentration in the reaction zone of the combustion of methane doped with ammonia and a fuel sulfur such as H_{2}S suggests that NS may be an important reactive intermediate in burning of hydrocarbon flames in a reducing atmosphere, which is relevant to coal pyrolysis and combustion.

Fossil fuels contain bound nitrogen, which releases elevated levels of nitric oxide emissions during combustion. NO_{x} emissions can be controlled by denitrification of the fuel source, combustion chamber modification, or both. One developing technique is the reburning of NO_{x}, which is reduced to N_{2}. These fuels also contain variable amounts of sulfur, which is oxidized to SO_{2}. Therefore, understanding the reactivity of NO and SO_{2} is crucial to the process of reburning. The experimental apparatus to test this involved a primary flame for producing combustion products, which were mixed with NO and SO_{2} to mimic coal burning byproducts. This mixture was fed into the burner at atmospheric pressure. 1–2% decrease in NO_{x} concentration is observed at various percentages of total fuel inlet (reburn ratio) in the presence of 0.1% SO_{2}, which is attributed to the formation of H_{2}S, HS, and the resulting reaction with NO, giving rise to NS. The reaction is:

HS + NO → NS + OH

== Related compounds ==
- Trithiazyl trichloride (NSCl)_{3}
- Sulfur nitride
