= Trans-acenaphthene-1,2-diol dehydrogenase =

Enzyme

trans-acenaphthene-1,2-diol dehydrogenase

Identifiers
- EC no.: 1.10.1.1
- CAS no.: 51901-21-4

Databases
- IntEnz: IntEnz view
- BRENDA: BRENDA entry
- ExPASy: NiceZyme view
- KEGG: KEGG entry
- MetaCyc: metabolic pathway
- PRIAM: profile
- PDB structures: RCSB PDB PDBe PDBsum
- Gene Ontology: AmiGO / QuickGO
Search
- PMC: articles
- PubMed: articles
- NCBI: proteins

In enzymology, a trans-acenaphthene-1,2-diol dehydrogenase (EC 1.10.1.1) is an enzyme that catalyzes the chemical reaction

(+/-)-trans-acenaphthene-1,2-diol + 2 NADP^{+} $\rightleftharpoons$ acenaphthenequinone + 2 NADPH + 2 H^{+}

Thus, the two substrates of this enzyme are (+/-)-trans-acenaphthene-1,2-diol and NADP^{+}, whereas its 3 products are acenaphthenequinone, NADPH, and H^{+}.

This enzyme belongs to the family of oxidoreductases, specifically those acting on diphenols and related substances as donor with NAD+ or NADP+ as acceptor. The systematic name of this enzyme class is (+/-)-trans-acenaphthene-1,2-diol:NADP+ oxidoreductase. This enzyme is also called trans-1,2-acenaphthenediol dehydrogenase.
