= Polythiazyl =

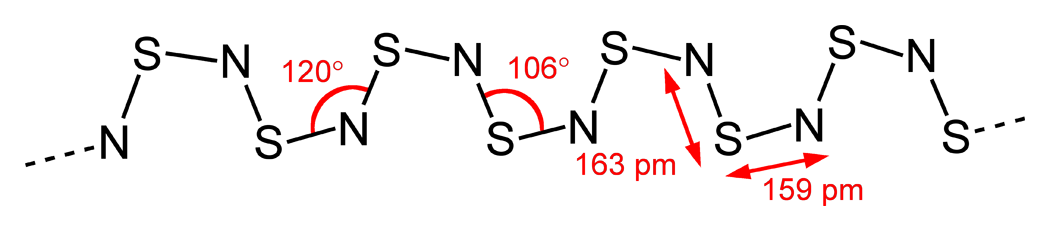

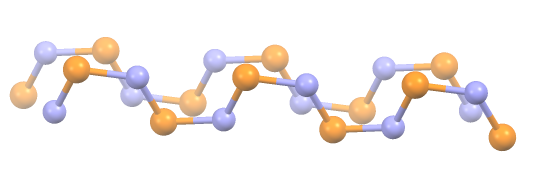

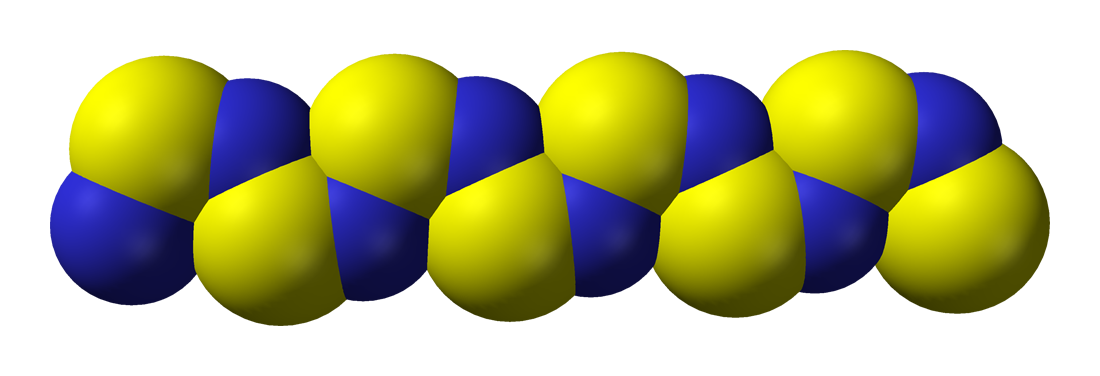

Names
- Other names polythiazyl poly(sulfur nitride)

Identifiers
CAS Number	56422-03-8
ChemSpider	none

Properties
Chemical formula	(SN)_{x}
Appearance	Golden or bronze-coloured crystalline solid with metallic lustre
- Except where otherwise noted, data are given for materials in their standard state (at 25 °C [77 °F], 100 kPa). verify (what is ?) Infobox references

Polythiazyl (polymeric sulfur nitride), (SN)_{x}, is an electrically conductive, gold- or bronze-colored polymer with metallic luster. It was the first conductive inorganic polymer discovered and was also found to be a superconductor at very low temperatures (below 0.26 K). It is a fibrous solid, described as "lustrous golden on the faces and dark blue-black", depending on the orientation of the sample. It is air stable and insoluble in all solvents.

== History ==
The compound was first reported as early as 1910 by F.P. Burt, who obtained it by heating tetrasulfur tetranitride in vacuum over silver wool.

The compound was the first compound with only non-metallic elements in which superconductivity could be demonstrated.

== Properties ==
Polythiazyl is a metallic-golden and shiny, crystalline but fibrous material with anisotropic electrical conductivity. It has at least two crystal polymorphs, which are usually intermixed after chemical synthesis. About 90% is the monoclinic form I, while the remainder is an orthorhombic form II. The orthorhombic portion can be increased mechanically through e.g. grinding, "although full conversion is unlikely."

Along the fibres (SN chains), polythiazyl is electrically conductive; perpendicular, an insulator. The one-dimensional conductivity arises from bonding conditions in the S-N chain, where each sulfur atom provides two π electrons and each nitrogen atom provides one π electron to form two-center 3π electron bonding units. At temperatures below 0.3 K, it becomes a electrical superconductor. The Peierls distortion is inhibited by weak inter-chain interactions, which resist the characteristic bond alternation.

Polythiazyl is "completely insoluble"; and mostly inert to oxygen and water. But it decomposes rapidly in alkaline solutions, and slowly in air to a grey powder after months of exposure. Halogens intercalate between the strands.

At temperatures above 240 °C explosive decomposition can occur. The compound also explodes on impact. Explosion generally proceeds via decomposition to the elements.

Vapor sublimed from polythiazyl is actually a cracked form of the polymer, the six-membered radical ring (SN)_{3}. Condensation reverts it back to the chain form.

=== Molecular structure and bonding ===
The material is a polymer, containing trivalent nitrogen and divalent and tetravalent sulfur. The S and N atoms on adjacent chains align. Several resonance structures can be written.

The structure of the crystalline compound was resolved by X-ray diffraction. This showed alternating S–N bond lengths of 159 pm and 163 pm and S–N–S bond angles of 120 ° and N–S–N bond angles of 106 °.

== Synthesis ==
The oldest-known polythiazyl synthesis is the polymerization of the cyclic formal dimer disulfur dinitride (S_{2}N_{2}), which is in turn synthesized from the formal tetramer tetrasulfur tetranitride (S_{4}N_{4}), in the presence of hot silver wool. The reaction begins when silver abstracts sulfur from S_{4}N_{4} to produce a Ag_{2}S catalyst; the resulting gaseous S_{2}N_{2} is then isolated through sublimation onto a cold surface:

S_{4}N_{4} + 8 Ag → 4 Ag_{2}S + 2 N_{2}
S_{4}N_{4} (low-pressure gas at 250-300 °C; Ag_{2}S catalyst) → 2 S_{2}N_{2} (gas) → 2 S_{2}N_{2} (stable solid at 77 K)

When warmed to room temperature, the additional heat induces impurity-catalyzed polymerization:

S_{2}N_{2} (0 °C) → (SN)_{x}

An alternative is the azide reduction of thiazyl chloride trimer, itself made from thiazyl fluoride:

(NSF)_{3} + Cl_{2} → (SNCl)_{3} + ClF
(SNCl)_{3} + NaN_{3} → NaCl + N_{2} + (SN)_{∞}

To eschew explosive reagents entirely, iron filings in nitromethane reduce the thiazyl chloride trimer to [(SN)_{5}]^{+}[FeCl_{4}]^{−}, which a platinum cathode reduces to polythiazyl.

== Uses ==
Due to its electrical conductivity, polythiazyl is used in LEDs, transistors, battery cathodes, and solar cells.
