= Dithiazolium =

Dithiazolium refers to families of heterocycles consisting of C_{2}NS_{2} rings. The cations are aromatic on the grounds that they have six pi-electrons. In principle, several isomers are possible, depending on the relative location of the C, N, and S atoms in the ring.

1,2,5-Dithiazolium cations arise from cycloaddition of dithionitronium (NS_{2}^{+}) to alkynes. The derivative with two trifluoromethyl groups (prepared from hexafluorobutyne) can be reduced to the 7 electron radical. This particular 1,3,5-dithiazole is also rare example of a radical that can be obtained as a solid, liquid, and gas. The gas is blue.

Benzo-1,2-3-dithiazolium salts can be prepared by the Herz reaction, which entails the reaction of an aniline with disulfur dichloride. Hydrolysis of this "Herz salt" gives the corresponding sodium thiolate, which can be further converted to the 2-aminothiophenol.

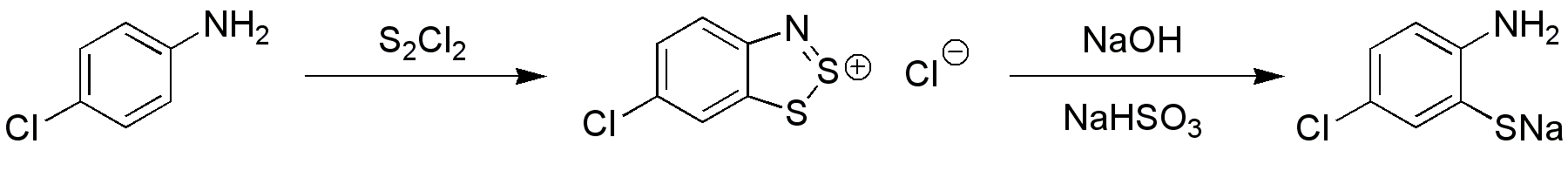
Herz-reaction

Appel's salt is an example of a 1,2,3-dithiazolium.
