= N2S2 =

N2S2 may refer to

- Nevada National Security Sites
- Disulfur dinitride
- A type of tetradentate ligand containing two nitrogen and two sulfur atoms at the binding site.
