= Herz reaction =

Reaction in organic chemistry

The Herz reaction, named after the chemist Richard Herz, is the chemical conversion of an aniline to the benzodithiazolium salt by its reaction with disulfur dichloride. The salt is called a Herz salt. Hydrolysis of this Herz salt give the corresponding sodium thiolate, which can be further converted to the 2-aminothiophenol.

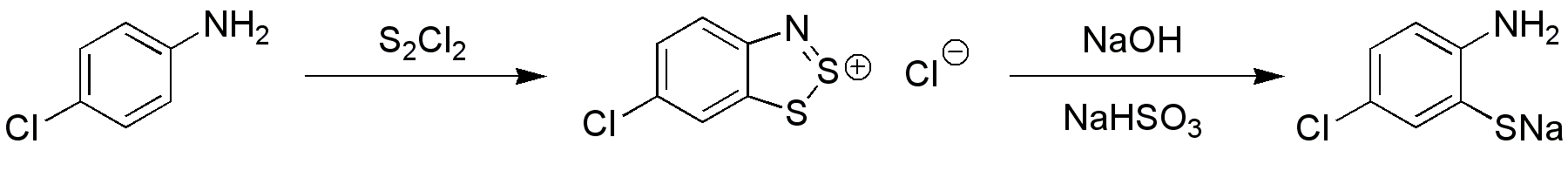
Herz reaction

The 2-aminothiophenols are suitable for diazotization, giving benzothiadiazoles. Instead the sodium 2-aminothiophenolate can be converted to a 1,3-benzothiazole.

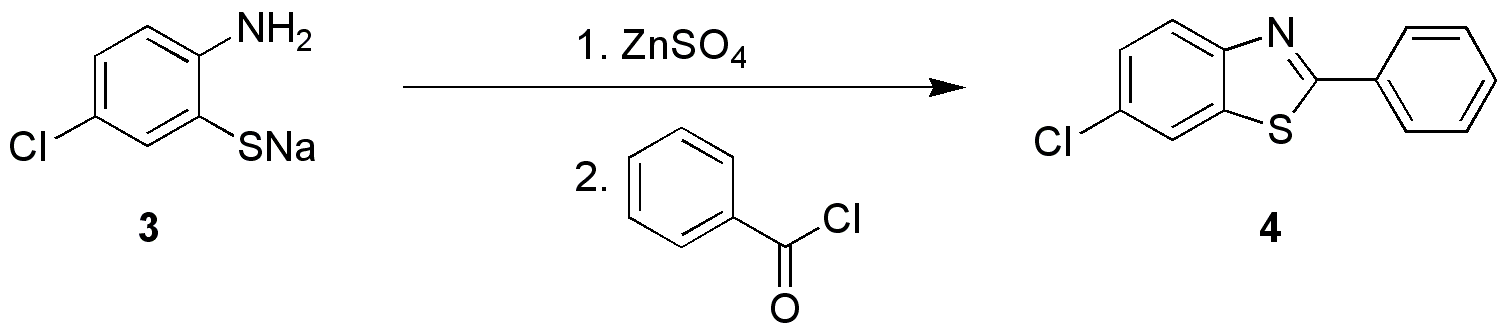
Herz reaction application

== Dyes ==
Aniline 5 is converted to compound 6, in three steps;

1. conversion to an ortho-aminothiol through the Herz-reaction (aniline 5 and disulfur dichloride), followed by
2. conversion to an ortho-aminoarylthioglycolacid and
3. conversion of the aromatic amine function to a nitrile via the Sandmeyer reaction.
4. In a last step the nitrile is hydrolysed resulting in 6. This compound is converted to 7 via a ring-closing reaction and decarboxylation.

The compound, (thioindoxyl, 7) is an important intermediate in the organic synthesis of some dyes. Condensation with acenaphthoquinone gives 8, a dye of the so-called Ciba-Scarlet type, while condensation of 7 with isatin results in the thioindigo dye 9.

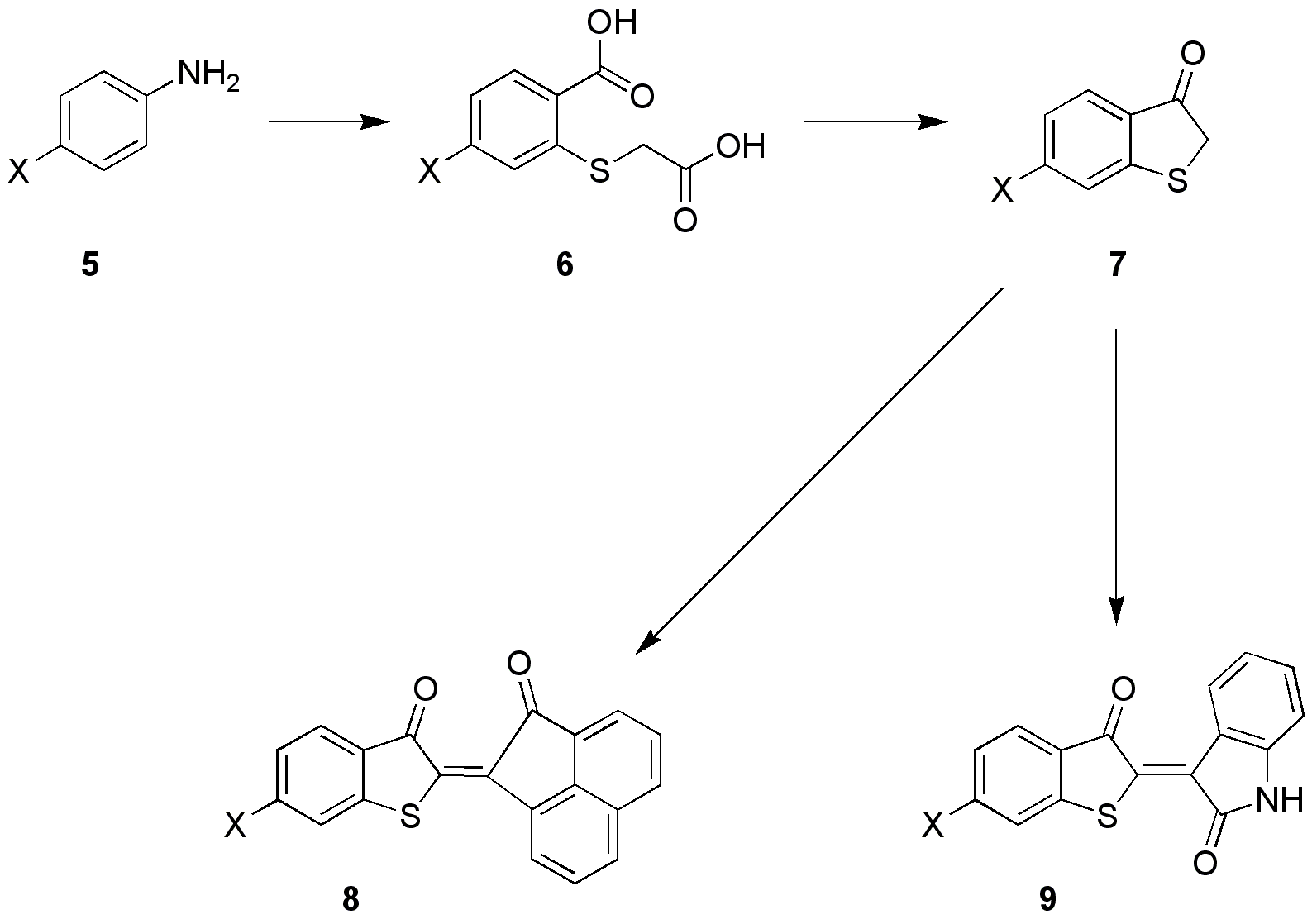
Herz reaction application dyes
