= Chloroacetonitrile =

Names
- Preferred IUPAC name Chloroacetonitrile
- Other names α-Chloroacetonitrile

Identifiers
CAS Number	107-14-2
3D model (JSmol)	Interactive image
ChEBI	CHEBI:82416
ChEMBL	ChEMBL3187297
ChemSpider	7568
ECHA InfoCard	100.003.153
EC Number	203-467-0
KEGG	C19360
PubChem CID	7856
RTECS number	AL8225000
UNII	CN524K9DXD
UN number	2668
CompTox Dashboard (EPA)	DTXSID7021524
- InChI: InChI=1S/C2H2ClN/c3-1-2-4/h1H2 Key: RENMDAKOXSCIGH-UHFFFAOYSA-N
- SMILES: C(C#N)Cl

Properties
Chemical formula	C_{2}H_{2}ClN
Molar mass	75.50 g·mol^{−1}
Appearance	colorless liquid
Density	1.193 g·cm^{−3}
Boiling point	123–124 °C (253–255 °F; 396–397 K)

Hazards
- GHS labelling
Pictograms	(GHS06: Toxic) (GHS09: Environmental hazard)
Signal word	Danger
Hazard statements	H301, H311, H331, H411
Precautionary statements	P261, P264, P270, P271, P273, P280, P301+P310, P302+P352, P304+P340, P311, P312, P321, P322, P330, P361, P363, P391, P403+P233, P405, P501
- Except where otherwise noted, data are given for materials in their standard state (at 25 °C [77 °F], 100 kPa). Infobox references

Chloroacetonitrile is the organic compound with the formula ClCH_{2}CN. A colorless liquid, it is derived from acetonitrile (CH_{3}CN) by replacement of one H with Cl. In practice, it is produced by dehydration of chloroacetamide. The compound is an alkylating agent, and as such is handled cautiously.

Chloroacetonitrile is also generated in situ by the reaction of acetonitrile with sulfur monochloride. A second chlorination gives dichloroacetonitrile, which undergoes cycloaddition with sulfur monochloride to give 4,5-dichloro-1,2,3-dithiazolium chloride:

Cl_{2}CHCN + S_{2}Cl_{2} → [S_{2}NC_{2}Cl_{2}]Cl + HCl

== See also ==
- halogenation
