= Trithiazyl trichloride =

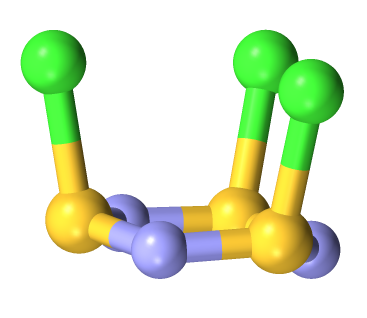

Names
- Other names thionitrosyl chloride

Identifiers
CAS Number	trimer: 5964-00-1; monomer: 17178-58-4
3D model (JSmol)	trimer: Interactive image; monomer: Interactive image
ChemSpider	trimer: 9271996; monomer: 123637
PubChem CID	trimer: 11096854; monomer: 140196
CompTox Dashboard (EPA)	trimer: DTXSID801337169; monomer: DTXSID70938043
- InChI: InChI=1S/Cl3N3S3/c1-7-4-8(2)6-9(3)5-7 Key: QBQMTUMJJWPFDJ-UHFFFAOYSA-N; monomer: InChI=1S/ClNS/c1-3-2 Key: FWVIYFTZAHMHIO-UHFFFAOYSA-N
- SMILES: trimer: ClS1=NS(Cl)=NS(Cl)=N1; monomer: N#SCl

Properties
Chemical formula	(NSCl)_{3}
Molar mass	244.55 g·mol^{−1}
Appearance	pale yellow solid
Melting point	Decomposes at 91 °C (196 °F; 364 K)
Solubility	soluble in CCl_{4}, CS_{2}, benzene, toluene, THF
- Except where otherwise noted, data are given for materials in their standard state (at 25 °C [77 °F], 100 kPa). Infobox references

Trithiazyl trichloride is the inorganic compound with the formula (NSCl)_{3}. A pale yellow solid, it is a precursor to other sulfur nitrides, but has no commercial applications.

== Structure ==
The molecule is a 6-membered ring of alternating nitrogen and sulfur atoms, where each sulfur atom is attached to one chlorine atom by a single bond. The molecule contains alternating single and double bonds in the S_{3}N_{3} core. The molecule has C_{3v} symmetry. The S_{3}N_{3} core is slightly ruffled structure with S-N distances of 160.5 pm. The S-Cl distances are 208 pm, and the chlorine atoms are mutually cis. The S centers are tetravalent and pyramidal. In contrast, with six fewer electrons, cyanuric chloride is a planar ring.

== Synthesis and reactions ==
Trithiazyl trichloride is obtained by chlorination of tetrasulfur tetranitride or thiazyl fluoride monomer:

3 S_{4}N_{4} + 6 Cl_{2} → 4 (NSCl)_{3}
3 FSN + 3 Cl_{2} → (NSCl)_{3} + 3 ClF

At 100 °C in vacuum, thiazyl chloride trimer undergoes cracking to thiazyl chloride monomer, which is a green gas.

(−N=S(−Cl)−)_{3} → 3 N≡S−Cl

In N≡S−Cl, chlorine is bonded to sulfur, in contrast to nitrosyl chloride O=N–Cl, where chlorine is bonded to nitrogen.

Alkoxide or silver salts displace the chlorides:

(–NS(Cl)–)_{3} + 3 NaOR → (–NS(OR)–)_{3} + 3 NaCl
(–NS(Cl)–)_{3} + 3 AgX → (–NS(X)–)_{3} + 3 AgCl

Treating thiazyl chloride with sulfur in the presence of antimony pentachloride gives dithionitronium hexachloroantimonate:

SNCl + S + SbCl_{_{5}} → [NS_{2}]SbCl_{6}

It reacts with nitriles to dithiadiazolium chlorides:

6 RCN + 4 (NSCl)_{3} → 6 [RCN_{2}S_{2}]^{+}Cl^{−} + 3 Cl_{2} + 3 N_{2}

Sulfur trioxide successively oxidizes the compound at the sulfur atoms to (NSOCl)_{3}. The latter is also the pyrolysis product of a mixture of phosphorus pentachloride and sulfamic acid. In principle, it exists as stereoisomers, but only one (all chlorides axial) had been isolated by 1979.
