= Dithiadiazole =

Class of chemical compounds

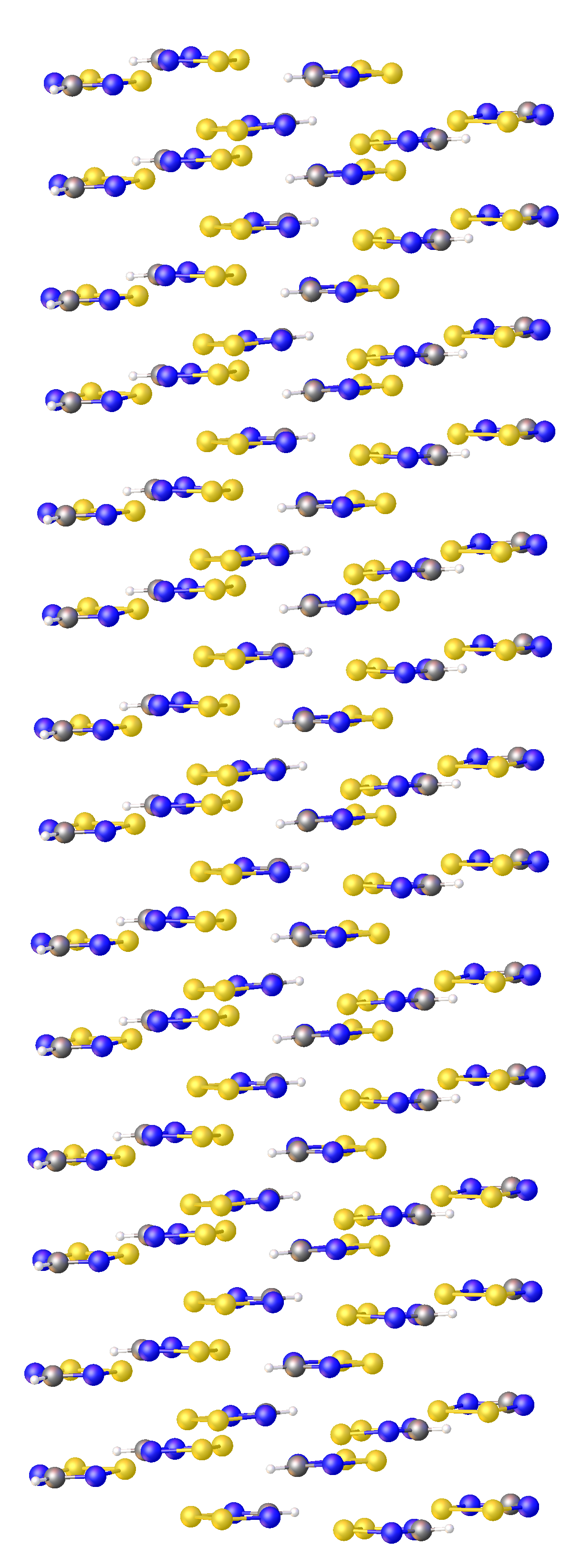
Part of the structure of 1,2‑dithia-3,5‑diazole highlighting the stacking motif common for these compounds. Color code: yellow = S, blue = N, gray = C.

In chemistry, dithiadiazoles are a family of heterocyclic compounds with the formula RCN_{2}S_{2}. Two isomers have been studied: the 1,2‑dithia-3,5‑diazoles, in which the sulfur atoms are bonded to each other across the ring from the carbon atom, and the 1,3‑dithia-2,5‑diazoles, in which nitrogen and sulfur atoms alternate around the ring. In both cases, the neutral species are radicals that are of interest as examples of paramagnetic heterocycles. They have also attracted interest because of the tendency of the neutral species to form linear chain compounds, a theme in molecular electronics.

== 1,2-Dithia-3,5-diazoles and their oxidized derivatives ==
Bond distances and bond angles of 1,3- and 1,2-dithiadiazolium cations. Distances in picometers.

=== Structures ===
The structures of both the 1,2-dithia-3,5-diazolium cations and the neutral 1,2-dithia-3,5-diazoles are fairly similar. These are planar five-membered rings. With one electron in a π*-level, the neutral ring has longer bonds vs the cation. The elongation is a few percent. For example, the S–S distance in the neutral HCN_{2}S_{2} is 207 vs 201 pm in the cation. Melting cracks these dimers to produce a paramagnetic liquid. Dithiadiazole radicals equilibrate with their (diamagnetic) spin-paired dimers via weak S---S interactions. The neutral species' slight dipole moment places a positive charge on the sulfur atoms.

For the 1,2-dithia-3,5-diazolium salts, their bright colors vary with the R side chain and the counterion.

=== Synthesis ===
The traditional entry to dithiadiazoles is reduction the mono-cation RCN_{2}S^{+}_{2}. These cations are obtained by the addition of nitriles and thiazyl chloride:

2 RCN + 4 NSCl → 2 [RCN_{2}S_{2}]^{+}Cl^{−} + Cl_{2} + N_{2}

For large-scale syntheses, a mixture of ammonium chloride and sulfur dichloride under a chlorine atmosphere substitutes cheaply for thiazyl chloride, but product yields are small. Alternatively, sulfur dichloride reacts with amidines to give dithiadiazolium chlorides, albeit with sensitivity to reaction conditions.

The dithidiazolium cations are reduced by treatment with iodide and thiocyanate:

2 [RCN_{2}S_{2}]^{+}[I]^{−} → 2 RCN_{2}S^{•}_{2} + I_{2}

A variety of reducing agents can be employed.

=== Reactions ===
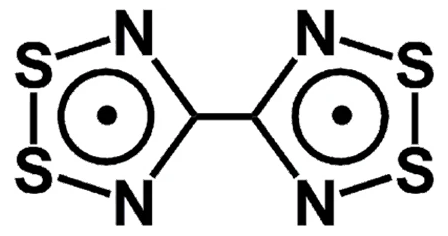
Molecule of 4,4′-bis(1,2,3,5-dithiadiazolyl) (BDTDA)

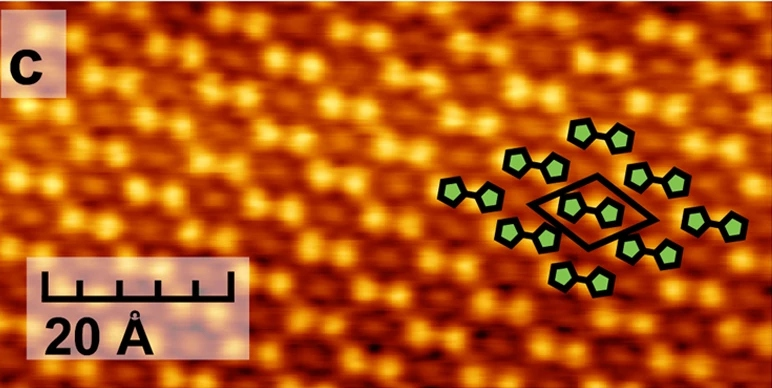
BDTDA honeycomb lattice on copper, STM image

Halogens typically reoxidize dithiadiazoles to dithiazolium cations:

2 RCN_{2}S^{•}_{2} + X_{2} → 2[ RCN_{2}S_{2}X ^{+}]X^{−}

Dithiadiazoles react with low-valent metal ion by oxidative addition of the S–S bonds. The products feature bidentate dithiolate-like ligands, each sulfur functioning as a bridging ligand.

Dithiadiazolium salts hydrolyze to amidine-hydrochloride salts, sulfur dioxide, and elemental sulfur.

== 1,3-Dithia-2,5-diazoles ==
1,3-Dithia-2,5-diazolium salts, which lack the S–S bond, are less common than the 1,2,3,5 isomer. The neutral 1,3-dithia-2,5-diazoles are even rarer.

The synthesis of these salts involves addition of dithionitronium hexafluoroarsenate ([SNS]^{+}[AsF_{6}]^{−}) to a nitrile. The conversion is an example of a 1,3-Dipolar cycloaddition.

The sulfur atoms bear a slight positive charge.

The electrophilicity of dithiadiazolium salts is indicated by their tendency to polymerize THF. They hydrolyze to an amide through a poorly-understood mechanism.

The singly-reduced dithiazole radical is unstable, isomerizing to 1,2‑dithia-3,5‑diazole or forming uncharacterized brown polymers.
