= Sulfur nitride =

Sulfur nitride may refer to a number of sulfur nitrogen compounds:

- Pentasulfur hexanitride, S_{5}N_{6}
- Tetrasulfur tetranitride, S_{4}N_{4}
- Tetrasulfur dinitride, S_{4}N_{2}
- Disulfur dinitride, S_{2}N_{2}
- Polythiazyl, (SN)_{x}
- Thiatetrazole, SN_{4}

Additionally, some unstable species are known:

- sulfur mononitride, SN, analogous to nitric oxide, NO
- Disulfur mononitride, S_{2}N, analogous to nitrogen dioxide, NO_{2}.
- Dinitrogen sulfide, SN_{2}, analogous to nitrous oxide, N_{2}O

== See also ==
- Nitrogen oxides, which are valence isoelectronic with sulfur nitrides
