= Dithionitronium hexafluoroarsenate =

Identifiers
CAS Number	80485-40-1
3D model (JSmol)	Interactive image
ChemSpider	9509584
PubChem CID	11334638
- InChI: InChI=1S/AsF6.NS2/c2-1(3,4,5,6)7;2-1-3/q-1;+1 Key: FHQHPTGLQAUWCS-UHFFFAOYSA-N
- SMILES: [N+](=S)=S.F[As-](F)(F)(F)(F)F

Properties
Chemical formula	AsF_{6}N_{2}S
Molar mass	248.99 g·mol^{−1}
Appearance	yellow solid
- Except where otherwise noted, data are given for materials in their standard state (at 25 °C [77 °F], 100 kPa). Infobox references

Dithionitronium hexafloroarsenate is the inorganic compound with the formula [SN_{2}]AsF_{6}. It is the hexafluoroarsenate (AsF^{−}_{6}) salt of S=N=S^{+}. The cation is of interest as the sulfur analogue of nitronium (NO^{+}_{2}). Hexafloroarsenate is a weakly coordinating anion. According to X-ray crystallography, S=N=S^{+} is linear with S-N distances of 146 picometers.

== Synthesis and reactions ==
Dithionitronium hexafluoroarsenate is prepared from thiazyl chloride using silver hexafluoroarsenate. The hexachloroantimonate salt can be prepared by treating thiazyl chloride with sulfur in the presence of antimony pentachloride according to this idealized equation:

SNCl + S + SbCl_{_{5}} → [NS_{2}]SbCl_{6}

The dithionitronium cation reacts with nitriles to give dithiadiazolium salts:

[NS_{2}]^{+} + RCN → [RCN_{2}S_{2}]^{+}

Addition to alkynes gives dithiazolium salts:

[NS_{2}]^{+} + R_{2}C_{2} → [(RC)_{2}NS_{2}]^{+}
