= Richard Herz =

German chemist (1867–1936)

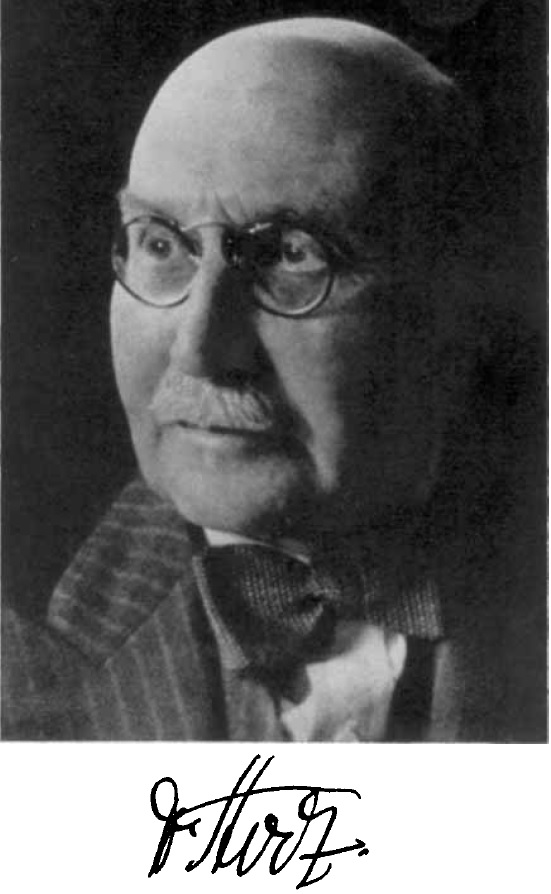
- Richard Herz circa 1920
- Born: 21 July 1867
- Died: 18 November 1936 (aged 69)
- Known for: Herz reaction

Richard Herz (21 July 1867 – 18 November 1936) was a German chemist. He discovered the Herz reaction.

He studied chemistry at the University of Heidelberg, at the Technische Hochschule in Berlin (now Technische Universität Berlin) and at the University of Berlin, and earned his PhD in 1891. From 1892 he was employed by the Leonhardt und Co. Works in Mühlheim am Main and in 1895 he joined a British firm, Levinstein, in Manchester. He was recruited by Cassella in 1899, and played a key role in the company's development of sulfur dyes. He received power of procuration in 1918 and became deputy director in 1925. He retired in 1931.
