= Thiazyl fluoride =

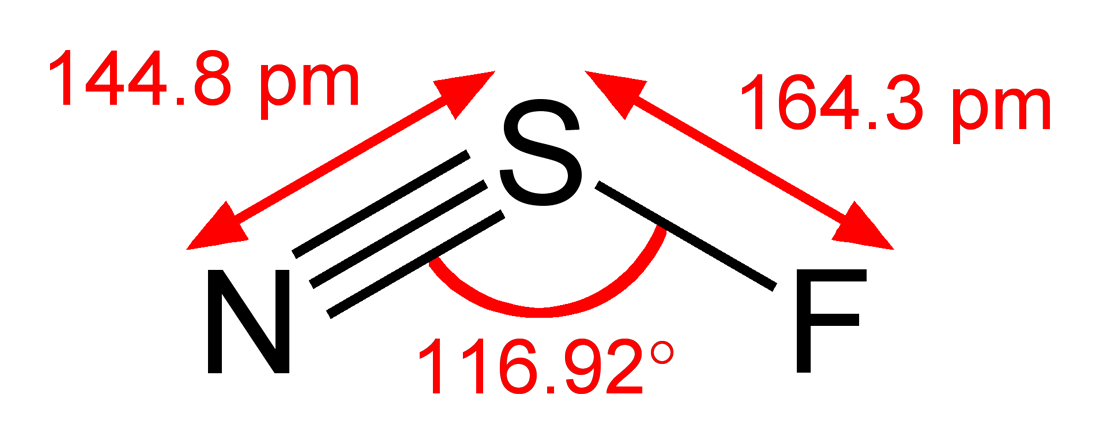

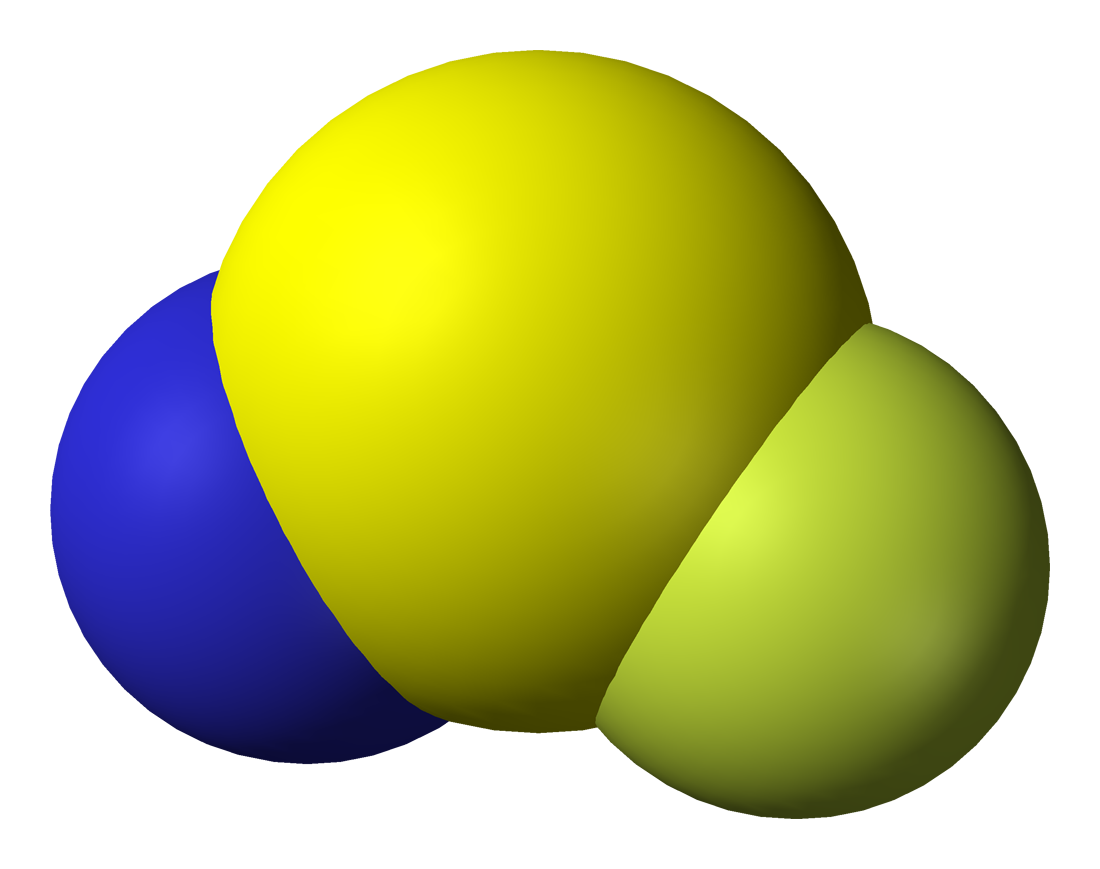

Identifiers
CAS Number	18820-63-8
3D model (JSmol)	Interactive image
ChemSpider	123854
PubChem CID	140430
CompTox Dashboard (EPA)	DTXSID00172170
- InChI: InChI=1S/FNS/c1-3-2 Key: IMFUYZDKLVTPSW-UHFFFAOYSA-N; InChI=1/FNS/c1-3-2 Key: IMFUYZDKLVTPSW-UHFFFAOYAG
- SMILES: FS#N

Properties
Chemical formula	NSF
Molar mass	65.07 g·mol^{−1}
Appearance	colourless gas
Melting point	−89 °C (−128 °F; 184 K)
Boiling point	0.4 °C (32.7 °F; 273.5 K)

Related compounds
Other anions	Thiazyl chloride
- Except where otherwise noted, data are given for materials in their standard state (at 25 °C [77 °F], 100 kPa). verify (what is ?) Infobox references

Thiazyl fluoride is a compound with the chemical formula NSF. It is a colourless, pungent gas at room temperature and condenses to a pale yellow liquid at 0.4 °C. Along with thiazyl trifluoride, NSF_{3}, it is a precursor to sulfur-nitrogen-fluorine compounds.

== Synthesis ==
Thiazyl fluoride can be synthesized by the reaction of imino(triphenyl)phosphines with sulfur tetrafluoride by cleavage of the bond to form sulfur difluoride imides and triphenyldifluorophosphorane. These products readily decompose yielding thiazyl fluoride. Another method is fluorination of tetrasulfur tetranitride with silver(II) fluoride or mercuric fluoride followed by vacuum distillation. This method, however, yields numerous side-products.

For synthesis on a preparative scale, the decomposition of compounds already containing the moiety is commonly used:

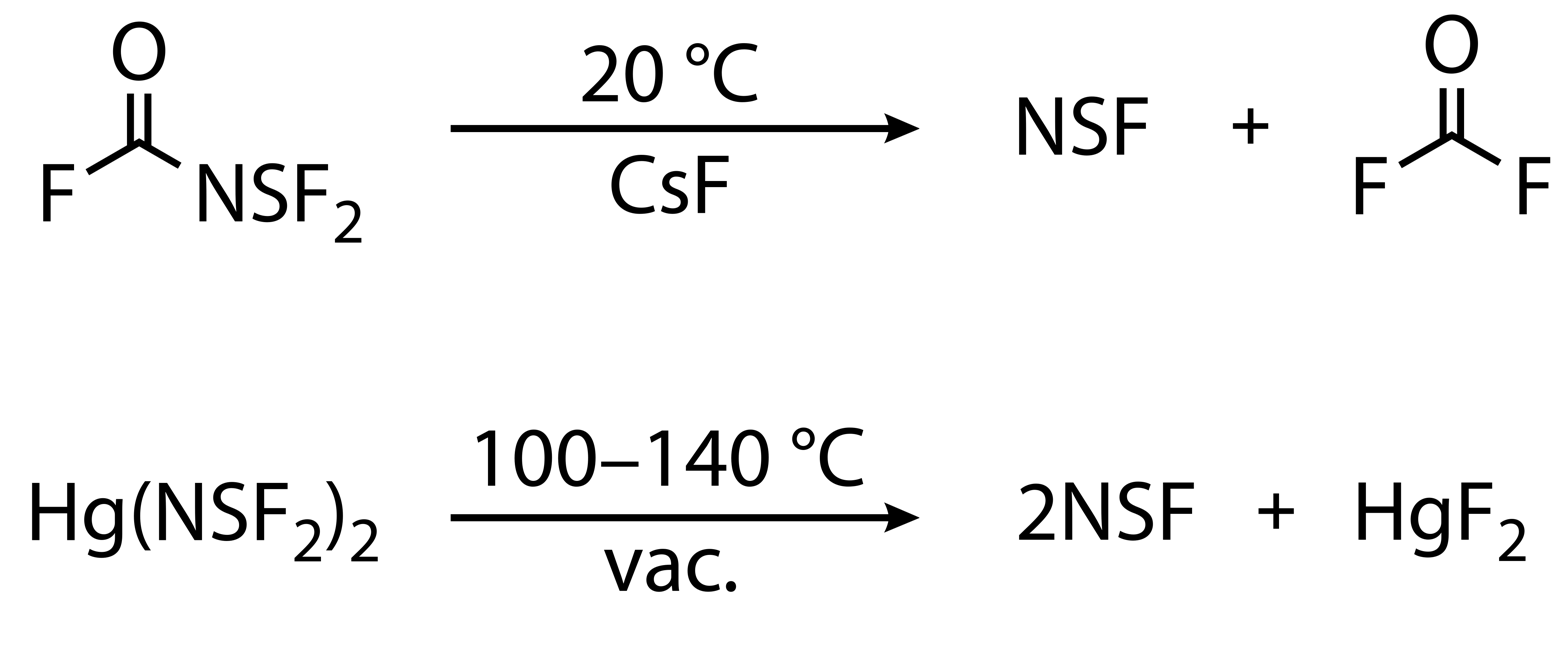

== Reactivity ==
=== Reactions with electrophiles and Lewis acids ===
Lewis acids remove fluoride to afford thiazyl salts:

NSF + BF_{3} → [N≡S]^{+}[BF_{4}]^{−}

Thiazyl fluoride functions as a ligand in [Re(CO)_{5}NSF]^{+}. and [M(NSF)_{6}]^{2+} (M = Co, Ni). In all of its complexes, NSF is bound to the metal center through nitrogen.

=== Reactions with nucleophiles ===
Thiazyl fluoride reacts violently with water:

NSF + 2 H_{2}O → SO_{2} + HF + NH_{3}

Nucleophilic attack on thiazyl fluoride occurs at sulfur atom:.

NS−F + Nu^{−} → NS−Nu + F^{−}

Fluoride gives an adduct:

NS−F + F^{−} → NSF^{−}_{2}

The halogen derivatives X−N=SF_{2} (X = F, Cl, Br, I) can be synthesized from reacting Hg(NSF)_{2} with X_{2}; whereby, ClNSF_{2} is the most stable compound observed in this series.

=== Oligomerization and cycloaddition ===
At room temperature, thiazyl fluoride trimerizes:

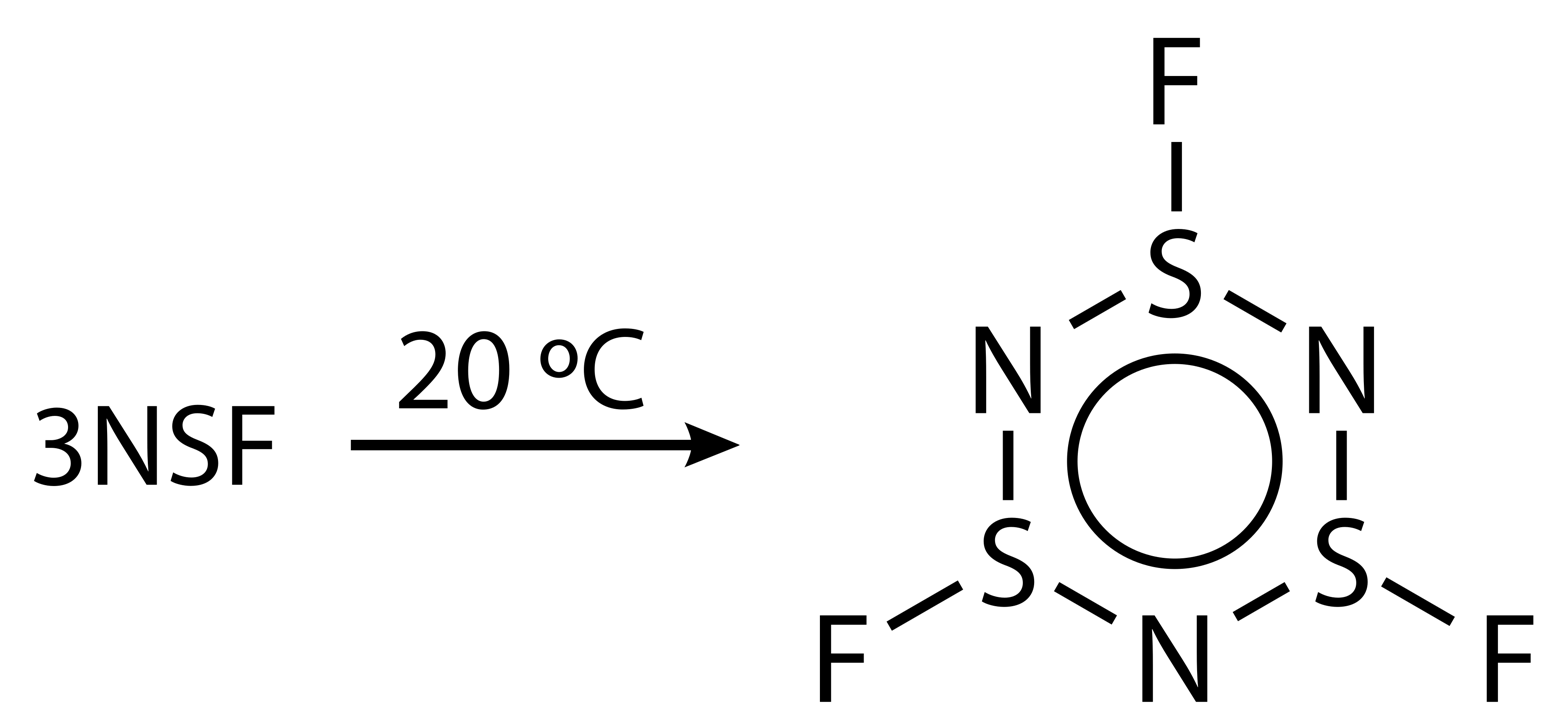

In the product 1,3,5-trifluoro-1λ^{4},3λ^{4},5λ^{4}-2,4,6-trithiatriazine, each sulfur atom remains tetravalent.

Thiazyl fluoride also participates in cycloaddition in the presence of dienes.

== Structure and bonding ==
The N−S bond length is 1.448 Å, which is short, indicating multiple bonding, and can be represented by the following resonance structures:

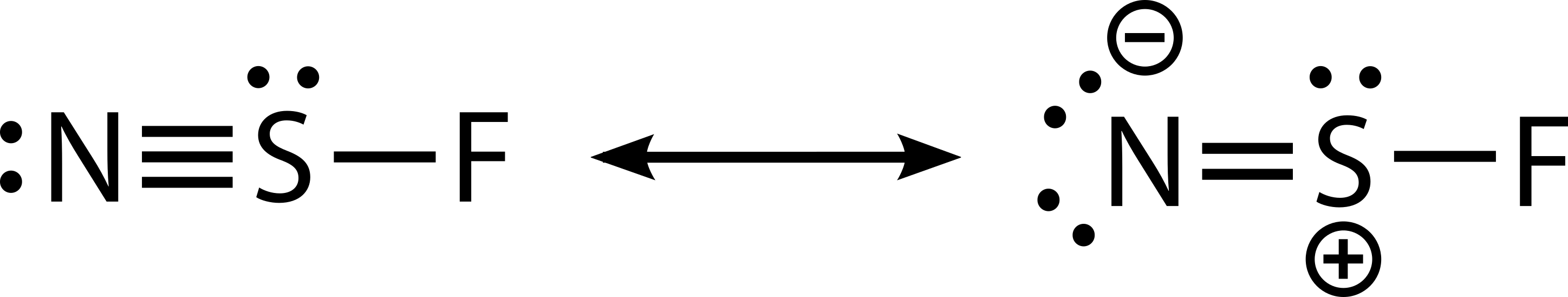

The NSF molecule has 18 total valence electrons and is isoelectronic to sulfur dioxide. Thiazyl fluoride adopts C_{s}-symmetry and has been shown by isotopic substitution to be bent in the ground state. A combination of rotational analysis with Franck-Condon calculations has been applied to study the electronic excitation from the A''$-$A' states, which results in the elongation of the nitrogen-sulfur bond by 0.11 Å and a decrease in the $\measuredangle$NSF by 15.3$^\circ$.
