= Thiazyl trifluoride =

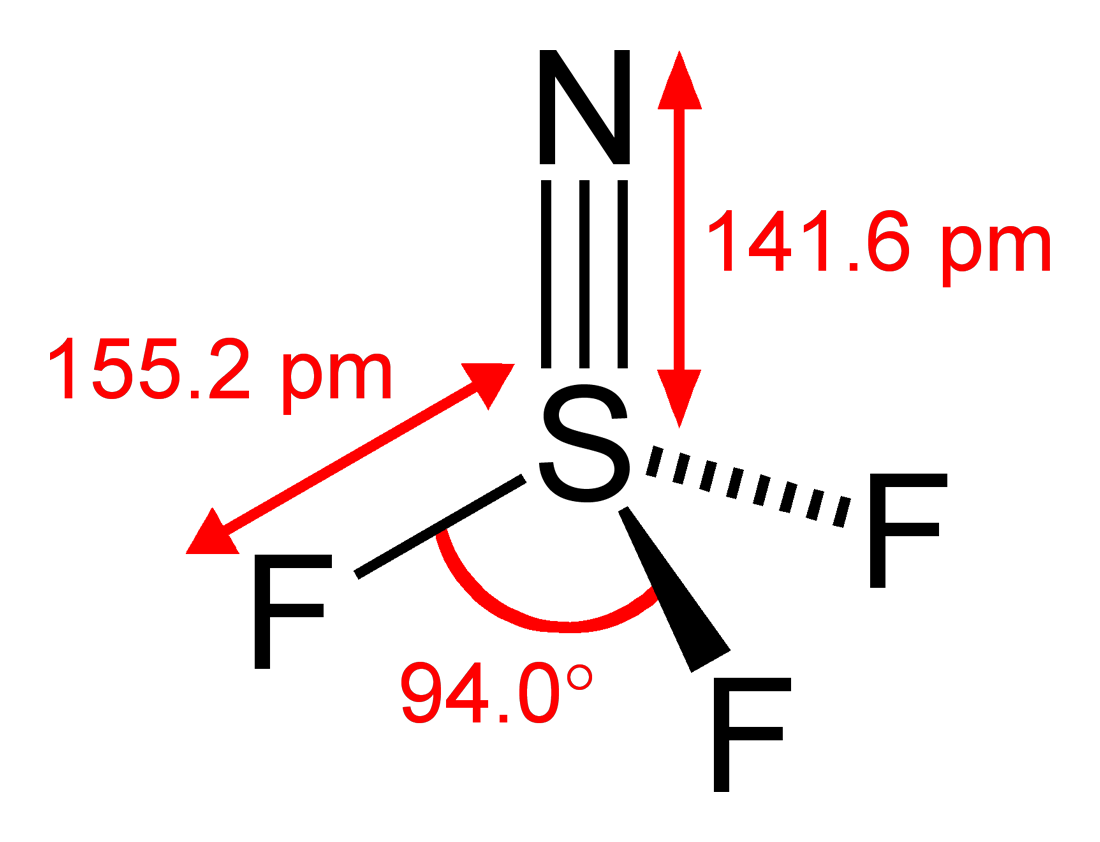

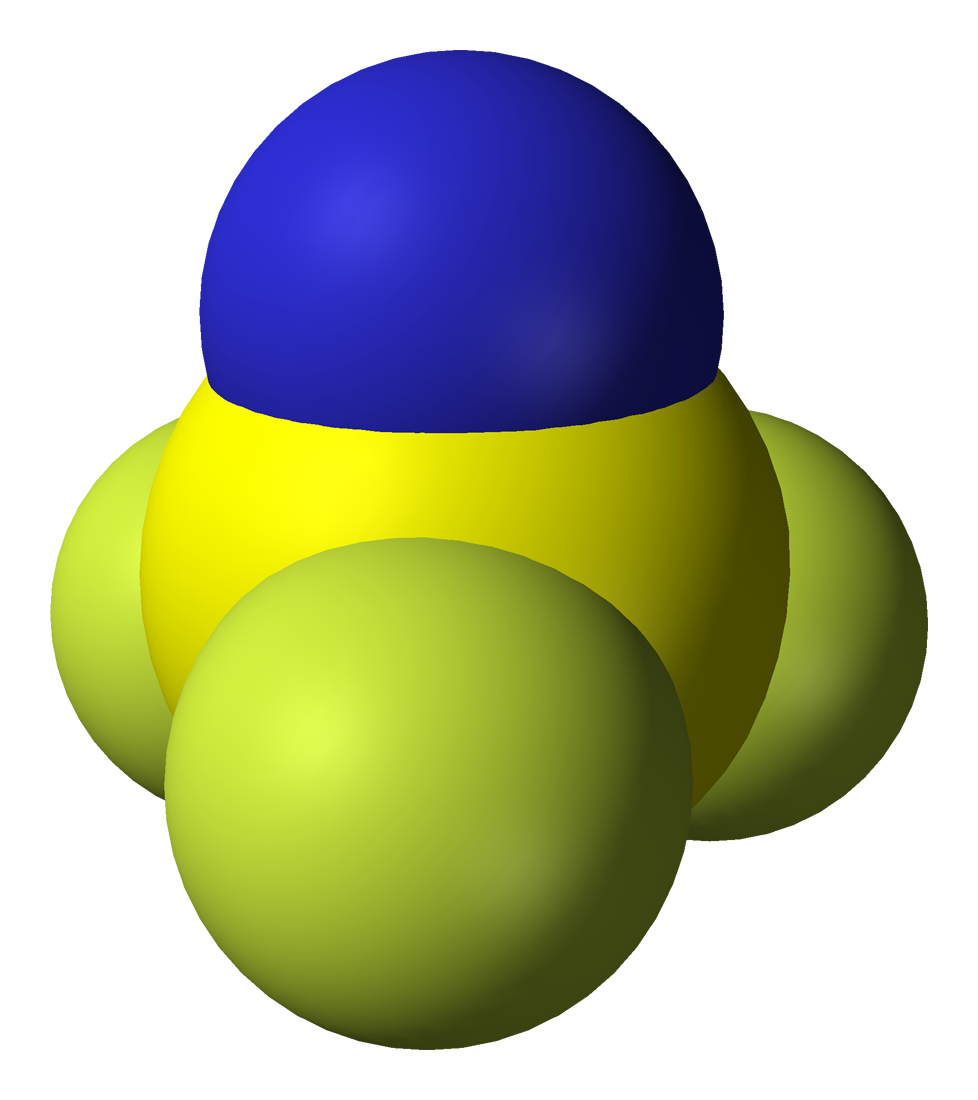

Names
- IUPAC name Thiazyl trifluoride
- Other names Sulfur(VI) nitride trifluoride Trifluorosulfanenitrile

Identifiers
CAS Number	15930-75-3
3D model (JSmol)	Interactive image
ChEBI	CHEBI:30507
ChemSpider	123471
PubChem CID	140008
CompTox Dashboard (EPA)	DTXSID30166628
- InChI: InChI=1S/F3NS/c1-5(2,3)4 Key: UQUPGRNSXINWBS-UHFFFAOYSA-N; InChI=1/F3NS/c1-5(2,3)4 Key: UQUPGRNSXINWBS-UHFFFAOYAR
- SMILES: FS(F)(F)#N

Properties
Chemical formula	NSF_{3}
Molar mass	103.06 g·mol^{−1}
Appearance	Colourless gas
Melting point	−72.6 °C (−98.7 °F; 200.6 K)
Boiling point	−27.1 °C (−16.8 °F; 246.1 K)

Structure
Molecular shape	Tetrahedral at the S atom
Hybridisation	sp^{3}
- Except where otherwise noted, data are given for materials in their standard state (at 25 °C [77 °F], 100 kPa). verify (what is ?) Infobox references

Thiazyl trifluoride is a chemical compound of nitrogen, sulfur, and fluorine, having the formula NSF_{3}. It exists as a stable, colourless gas, and is an important precursor to other sulfur-nitrogen-fluorine compounds. It has tetrahedral molecular geometry around the sulfur atom, and is regarded to be a prime example of a compound that has a sulfur-nitrogen triple bond.

== Preparation ==
NSF_{3} can be synthesised by the fluorination of thiazyl fluoride, NSF, with silver(II) fluoride, AgF_{2}:

NSF + 2 AgF_{2} → NSF_{3} + 2 AgF

or by the oxidative decomposition of FC(O)NSF_{2} by silver(II) fluoride:

FC(O)NSF_{2} + 2 AgF_{2} → NSF_{3} + 2 AgF + COF_{2}

It is also a product of the oxidation of ammonia by S_{2}F_{10}.

Direct fluorination of mercury difluorosulfinimide (Hg(NSF_{2})_{2}) does not give thiazyl trifluoride, but instead the isomeric fluoriminosulfur difluoride (F_{2}SNF).

== Reactions ==
NSF_{3} is much more stable than thiazyl fluoride, does not react with ammonia and hydrogen chloride, and only reacts with sodium at 400 °C. However, the fluoride ligands are labile, and can be displaced by secondary amines. Thiazyl trifluoride reacts with carbonyl fluoride (COF_{2}) in the presence of hydrogen fluoride to form pentafluorosulfanyl isocyanate (SF_{5}NCO).

NSF_{3} adds HF reversibly to give H_{2}NSF_{5}.
