= Disulfur dinitride =

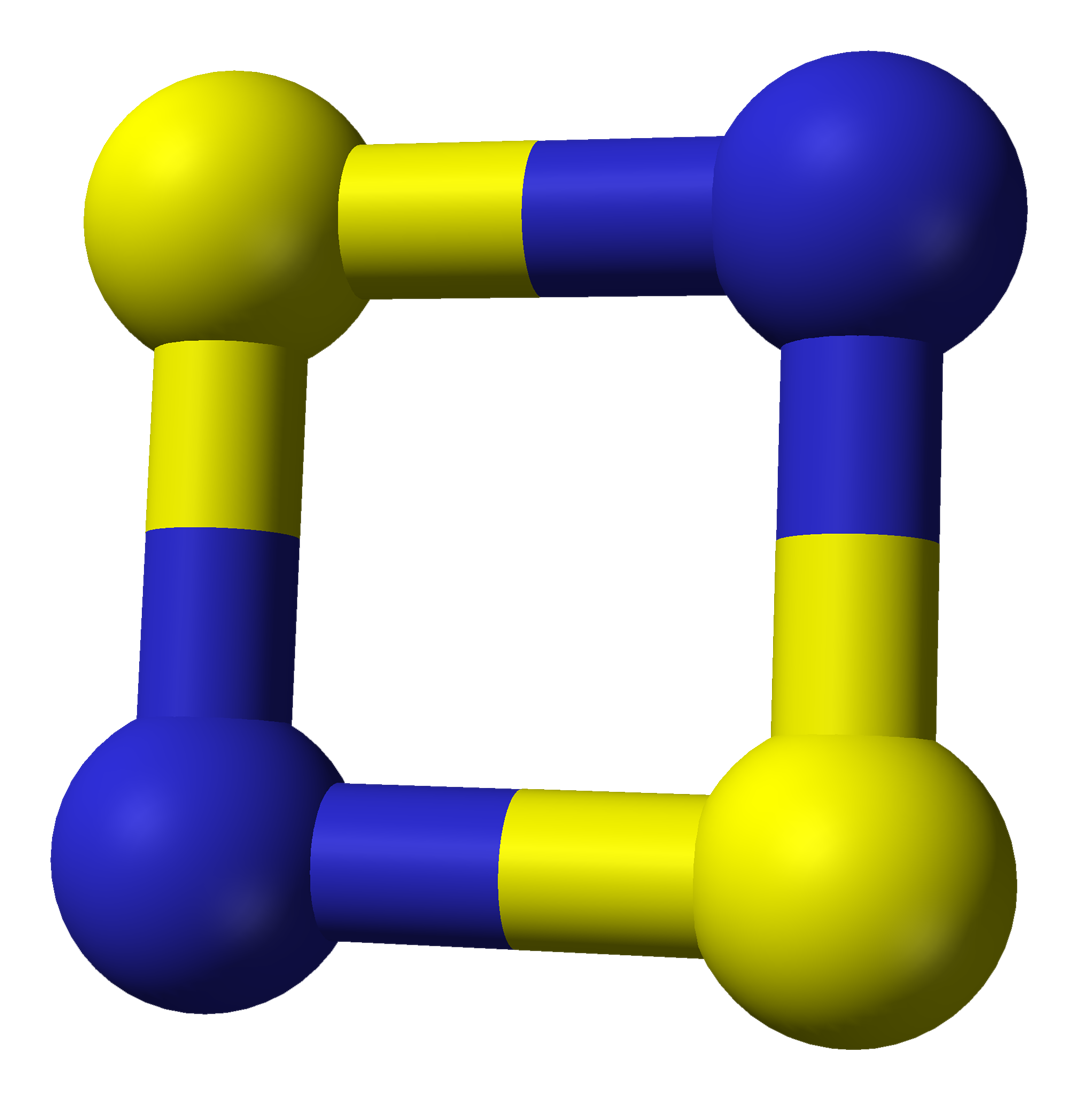
- Space-filling model of disulfur dinitride

Names
- Preferred IUPAC name Disulfur dinitride
- Systematic IUPAC name 1λ^{4},3,2,4-Dithiadiazete
- Other names Cyclic sulfur(II,IV) nitride 1,3-dithia-2,4-diazacyclobutan-2,4-diyl

Identifiers
CAS Number	25474-92-4
3D model (JSmol)	Interactive image
ChEBI	CHEBI:37756
ChemSpider	124561
PubChem CID	141213
CompTox Dashboard (EPA)	DTXSID401027576
- InChI: InChI=1S/N2S2/c1-3-2-4-1 Key: HGFWWXXKPBDJAH-UHFFFAOYSA-N
- SMILES: S1N=S=N1

Properties
Chemical formula	S_{2}N_{2}
Molar mass	92.1444 g/mol
Appearance	colourless crystals
- Except where otherwise noted, data are given for materials in their standard state (at 25 °C [77 °F], 100 kPa). Infobox references

Disulfur dinitride is the chemical compound with the formula S_{2}N_{2}.

== Preparation and reactions ==
Passing gaseous S_{4}N_{4} over silver metal wool at 250–300 °C at low pressure (1 mmHg) yields cyclic S_{2}N_{2}. The silver reacts with the sulfur produced by the thermal decomposition of the S_{4}N_{4} to form Ag_{2}S, and the resulting Ag_{2}S catalyzes the conversion of the remaining S_{4}N_{4} into the four-membered ring S_{2}N_{2},

S_{4}N_{4} + 8 Ag → 4 Ag_{2}S + 2 N_{2}
S_{4}N_{4} → 2 S_{2}N_{2}

An alternative uses the less explosive S_{4}N_{3}Cl.

S_{2}N_{2} decomposes explosively above 30 °C, and is shock sensitive. It readily sublimes, and is soluble in diethyl ether. Traces of water or other nucleophiles cause it to polymerize into S_{4}N_{4}. In the solid state it spontaneously polymerizes forming (SN)_{n}, catalyzed by radical impurities. It forms adducts with Lewis acids via a nitrogen atom, e.g. S_{2}N_{2}·BCl_{3}, S_{2}N_{2}·2AlCl_{3}, S_{2}N_{2}·SbCl_{5}, S_{2}N_{2}·2SbCl_{5}.

== Structure and bonding ==
The S_{2}N_{2} molecule is a four-membered ring, with alternating S and N atoms. The molecule is almost square and planar. The S–N bond lengths are 165.1 pm and 165.7 pm and the bond angles are very close to 90°.

The S_{2}N_{2} molecule is isoelectronic with the cyclic S^{2+}_{4} dication, but the oft-quoted description of S_{2}N_{2} bearing 6 π electrons is inaccurate. According to spin-coupled valence bond analysis, the molecule is instead better interpreted as two conjoined sulfur diimides: each sulfur atom bears a single +1 formal charge and one lone pair and each nitrogen atom a single -1 formal charge and two lone pairs. The remaining two electrons, each located on sulfur, are coupled across the ring as a singlet diradical. Loosely, the HOMO and LUMO of S_{2}N_{2} are each nonbonding orbitals corresponding to these two electrons.

== See also ==
- Sulfur nitride
- Tetrasulfur tetranitride
- Polythiazyl
- Square planar molecular geometry
