= 4,5-Dichloro-1,2,3-dithiazolium chloride =

Names
- Other names Appel's salt

Identifiers
CAS Number	75318-43-3
3D model (JSmol)	Interactive image
ChemSpider	9270989
PubChem CID	11095847
UNII	156NP9484D
CompTox Dashboard (EPA)	DTXSID30455049
- InChI: InChI=1S/C2Cl2NS2.ClH/c3-1-2(4)6-7-5-1;/h;1H/q+1;/p-1 Key: NIZMCFUMSHISLW-UHFFFAOYSA-M
- SMILES: C1(=NS[S+]=C1Cl)Cl.[Cl-]

Properties
Chemical formula	C_{2}Cl_{3}NS_{2}
Molar mass	208.50 g·mol^{−1}
Appearance	dark green solid
Melting point	172 °C (342 °F; 445 K) decomposition
- Except where otherwise noted, data are given for materials in their standard state (at 25 °C [77 °F], 100 kPa). Infobox references

4,5-Dichloro-1,2,3-dithiazolium chloride (Appel's salt) is an organosulfur compound. It is the chloride salt of the 4,5-dichloro-1,2,3-dithiazolium cation. It is a green solid that is poorly soluble in organic solvents.

== Synthesis ==
The compound is obtained by the reaction of acetonitrile with sulfur monochloride. The initial phases of this reaction entail chlorination of the acetonitrile. The resulting dichloroacetonitrile undergoes cycloaddition with sulfur monochloride:

Cl_{2}CHCN + S_{2}Cl_{2} → [S_{2}NC_{2}Cl_{2}]Cl + HCl

The cation is highly electrophilic. It hydrolyzes readily. Protic nucleophiles displace one chloride:

[S_{2}NC_{2}Cl_{2}]Cl + 2 RNH_{2} → S_{2}NC_{2}Cl(=NR) + [RNH_{3}]Cl

The compound was discovered by Appel et al.
