= Acenaphthoquinone =

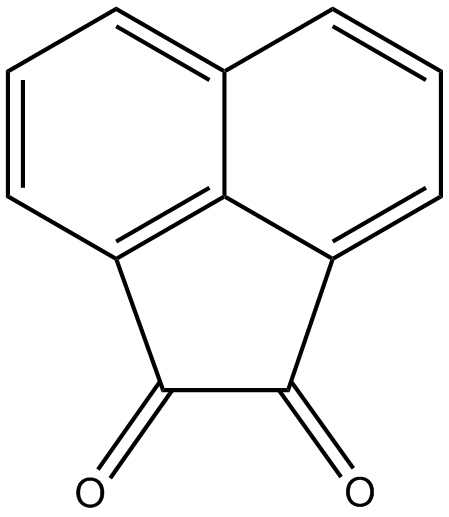

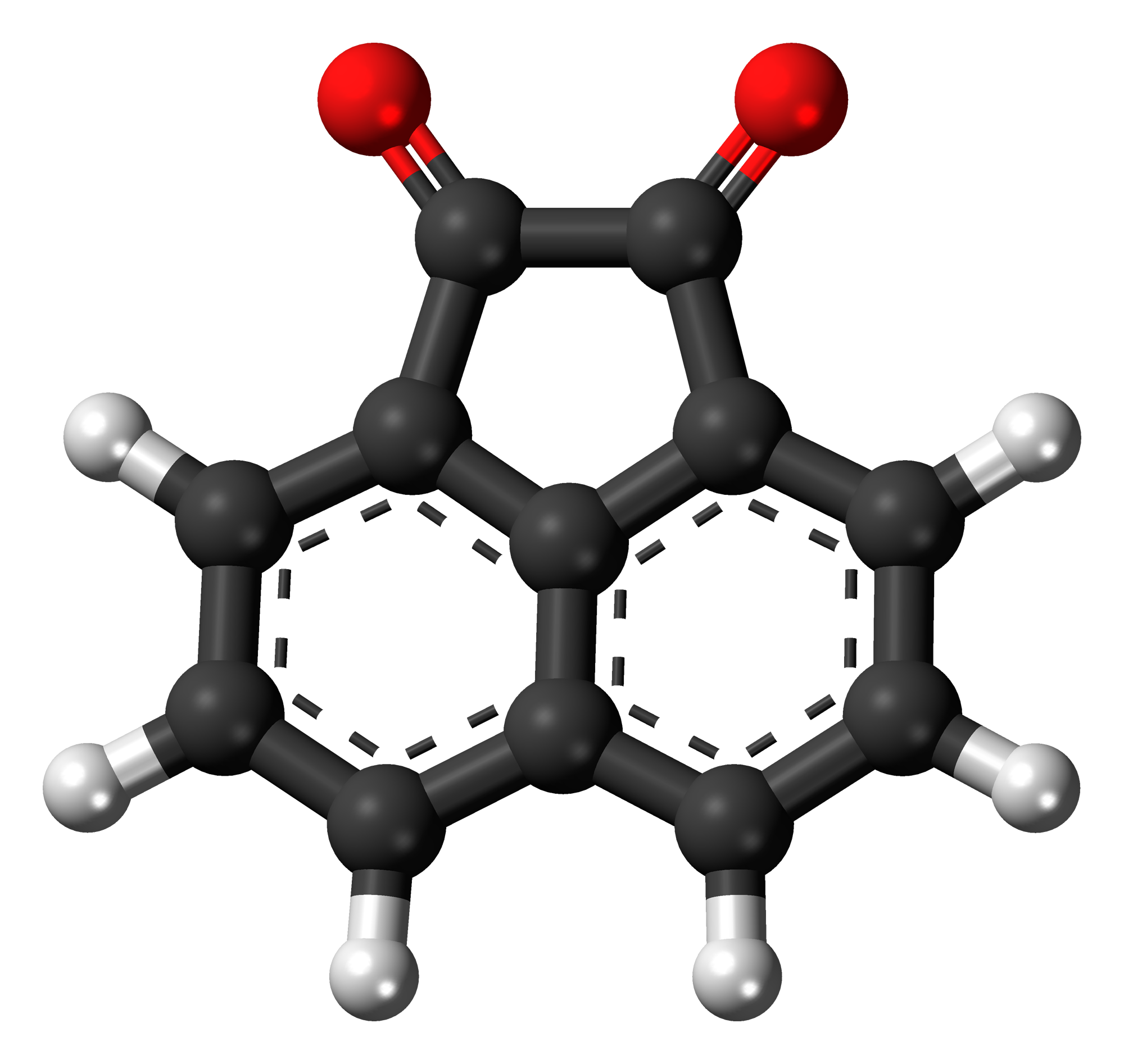

Names
- Preferred IUPAC name Acenaphthylene-1,2-dione
- Other names Acenaphthoquinone (no longer accepted even in general nomenclature); Acenaphthenequinone; 1,2-Acenaphthenequinone; Acenaphthenedione; 1,2-Acenaphthylenedione; Acenaphthene-1,2-dione; 1,2-Diketoacenaphthene

Identifiers
CAS Number	82-86-0
3D model (JSmol)	Interactive image
ChEBI	CHEBI:15342
ChEMBL	ChEMBL395653
ChemSpider	6468
ECHA InfoCard	100.001.311
EC Number	201-441-3
KEGG	C02807
PubChem CID	6724
UNII	3950D6UEIQ
CompTox Dashboard (EPA)	DTXSID7049429
- InChI: InChI=1S/C12H6O2/c13-11-8-5-1-3-7-4-2-6-9(10(7)8)12(11)14/h1-6H Key: AFPRJLBZLPBTPZ-UHFFFAOYSA-N; InChI=1/C12H6O2/c13-11-8-5-1-3-7-4-2-6-9(10(7)8)12(11)14/h1-6H Key: AFPRJLBZLPBTPZ-UHFFFAOYAC
- SMILES: O=C3c2cccc1cccc(c12)C3=O

Properties
Chemical formula	C_{12}H_{6}O_{2}
Molar mass	182.178 g·mol^{−1}
Appearance	Purple-yellow crystals to brown powder
Melting point	257 to 261 °C (495 to 502 °F; 530 to 534 K)
Solubility in water	Insoluble (90.1 mg/L)

Hazards
- Occupational safety and health (OHS/OSH)
Main hazards	Irritating
- GHS labelling
Pictograms	(GHS07: Exclamation mark)
Signal word	Warning
Hazard statements	H315, H319, H335
Precautionary statements	P261, P264, P271, P280, P302+P352, P304+P340, P305+P351+P338, P312, P321, P332+P313, P337+P313, P362, P403+P233, P405, P501
NFPA 704 (fire diamond)	2 0 0
- Except where otherwise noted, data are given for materials in their standard state (at 25 °C [77 °F], 100 kPa). verify (what is ?) Infobox references

Acenaphthoquinone is a quinone derived from acenaphthene. It is a water-insoluble yellow solid. It is a precursor to some agrichemicals and dyes.

== Preparation ==
The compound is prepared in the laboratory by oxidation of acenaphthene with potassium dichromate. Commercially, oxidation is effected with peroxide. Over-oxidation gives naphthalenedicarboxylic anhydride.
