= Tetrasulfur tetranitride =

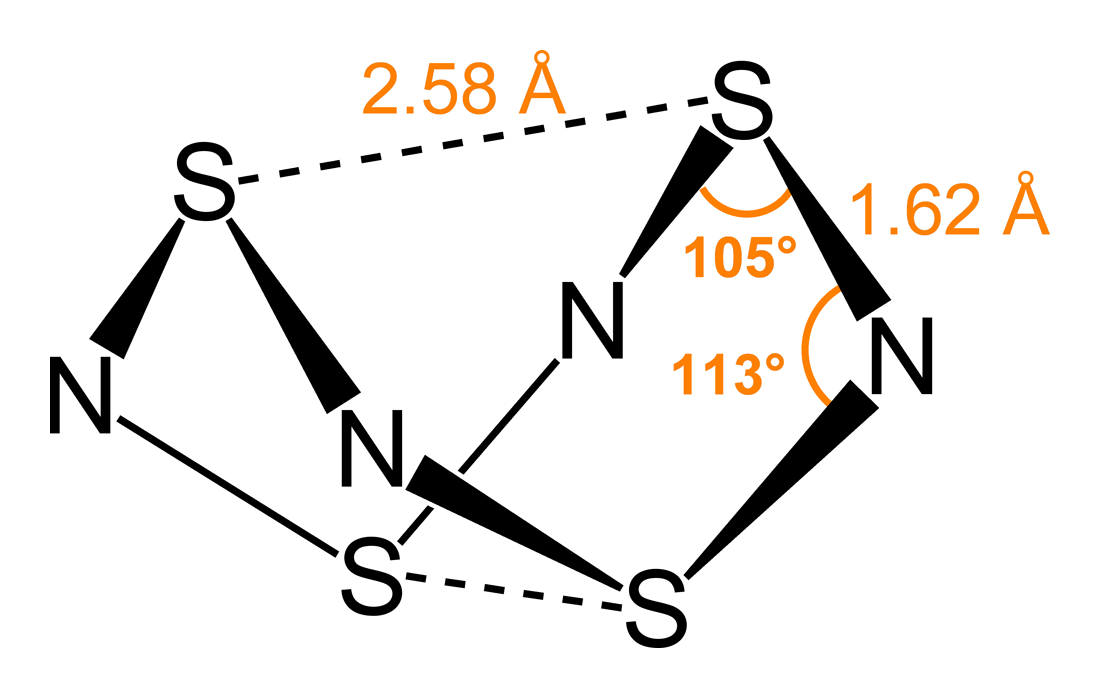
- Stereo, skeletal formula of tetrasulfur tetranitride with some measurements

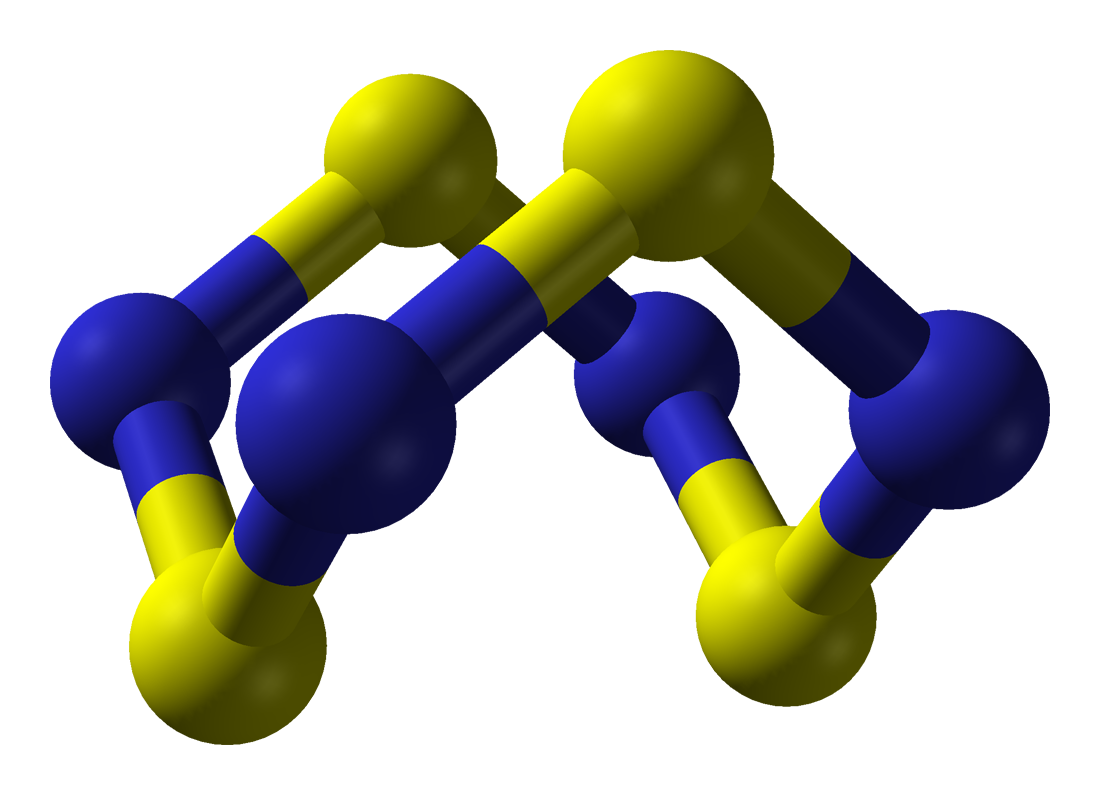
Ball and stick model of tetrasulfur tetranitride
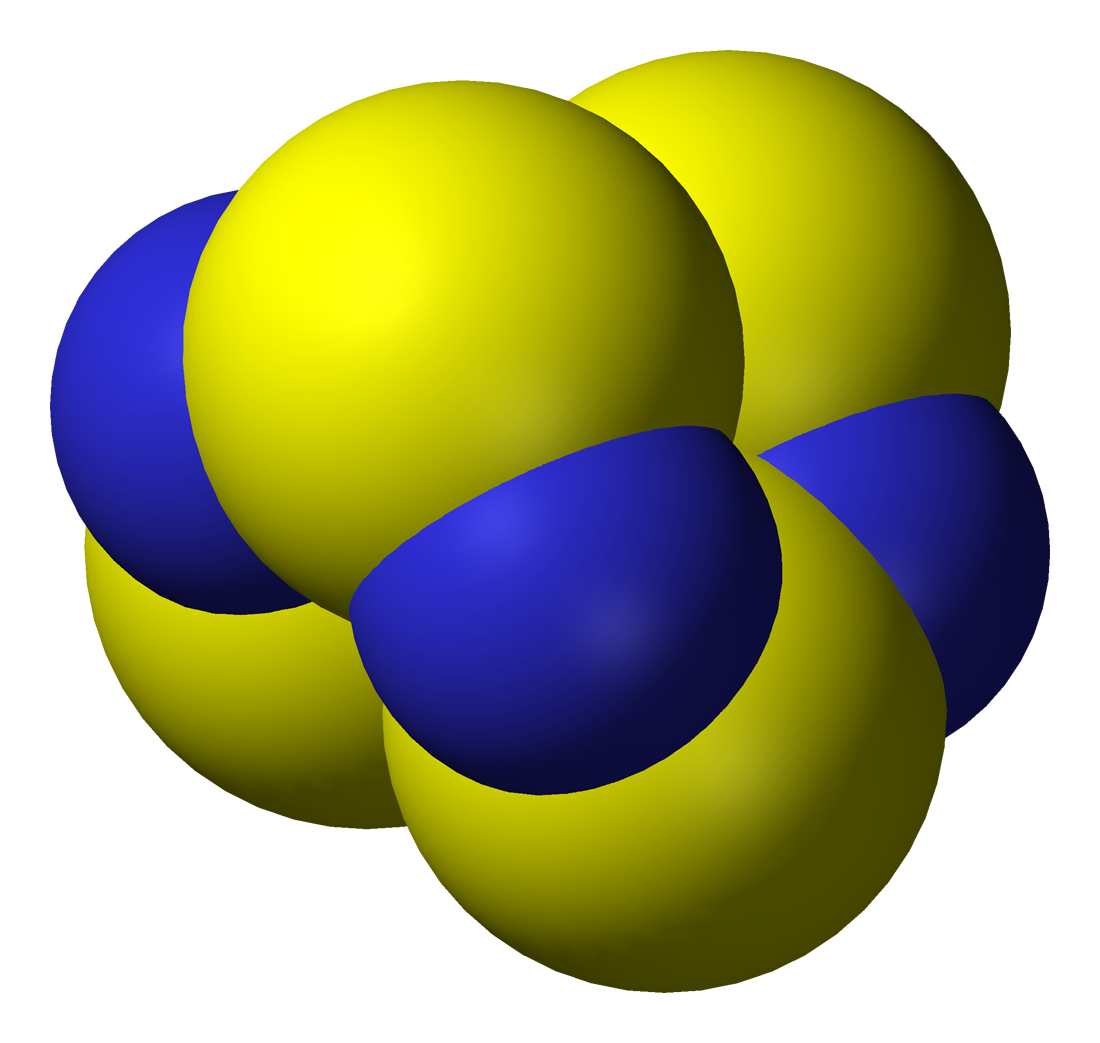
Space-filling model of tetrasulfur tetranitride
- Resonance structures of tetrasulfur tetranitride

Names
- IUPAC name Tetrasulfur tetranitride
- Systematic IUPAC name 1λ^{4},3,5λ^{4},7-tetrathia-2,4,6,8-tetrazacycloocta-1,4,5,8-tetraene
- Other names: Cyclic sulfur(III) nitride tetramer; Tetranitrogen tetrasulfide; 1λ^{4},3,5λ^{4},7,2,4,6,8-Tetrathiatetrazocine

Identifiers
CAS Number	28950-34-7
3D model (JSmol)	Interactive image
ChemSpider	124788
PubChem CID	141455
UNII	9BXS997HR6
CompTox Dashboard (EPA)	DTXSID20183147
- InChI: InChI=1S/N4S4/c1-5-2-7-4-8-3-6-1 Key: LTPQFVPQTZSJGS-UHFFFAOYSA-N
- SMILES: N1=[S]N=[S]N=[S]N=[S]1

Properties
Chemical formula	S_{4}N_{4}
Molar mass	184.287 g/mol
Appearance	Vivid orange, opaque crystals
Melting point	187 °C (369 °F; 460 K)
- Except where otherwise noted, data are given for materials in their standard state (at 25 °C [77 °F], 100 kPa). verify (what is ?) Infobox references

Tetrasulfur tetranitride is an inorganic compound with the formula S_{4}N_{4}. This vivid orange, opaque, crystalline explosive is the most important binary sulfur nitride, which are compounds that contain only the elements sulfur and nitrogen. It is a precursor to many S-N compounds and has attracted wide interest for its unusual structure and bonding.

Nitrogen and sulfur have similar electronegativities and atomic radii. When the properties of atoms are so highly similar, they often form extensive families of covalently bonded structures and compounds. Indeed, a large number of S-N and S-NH compounds are known with S_{4}N_{4} as their parent.

== Structure ==
The bonding in S_{4}N_{4} is considered to be delocalized, which is indicated by the fact that the bond distances between neighboring sulfur and nitrogen atoms are nearly identical.

S_{4}N_{4} adopts an unusual "extreme cradle" structure, with D_{2d} molecular symmetry. It can be viewed as a derivative of a (hypothetical) eight-membered ring (or more simply a 'deformed' eight-membered ring) of alternating sulfur and nitrogen atoms. The four nitrogen atoms form a square and the four sulfur atoms an approximate tetrahedron. The pairs of sulfur atoms across the ring are separated by 2.586 Å, resulting in a cage-like structure as determined by single crystal X-ray diffraction. The nature of the transannular interaction between those sulfur atoms remains a matter of investigation, especially in the context of molecular orbital theory. The distance is significantly shorter than the sum of the van der Waals radii and seems to be similar to the strength of a hydrogen bond.

S_{4}N_{4} has been shown to co-crystallize with benzene and the C_{60} molecule.

== Properties ==
S_{4}N_{4} is stable to air. It is, however, unstable in the thermodynamic sense with a positive enthalpy of formation of +460 kJ/mol. This endothermic enthalpy of formation originates in the difference in energy of S_{4}N_{4} compared to its highly stable decomposition products:

2 S_{4}N_{4} → 4 N_{2} + S_{8}

S_{4}N_{4} is shock and friction sensitive and because one of its decomposition products is a gas, it is considered a primary explosive. Purer samples tend to be more sensitive. Small samples can be detonated by striking with a hammer.

S_{4}N_{4} is thermochromic, changing from pale yellow below −30 °C to orange at room temperature to deep red above 100 °C.

== Synthesis ==
S_{4}N_{4} was first prepared in 1835 by M. Gregory by the reaction of disulfur dichloride with ammonia, a process that has been optimized:

4 [NH_{4}]Cl + 6 S_{2}Cl_{2} → S_{4}N_{4} + 16 HCl + S_{8}

Several variants on the reaction are known, and yields are generally maximized when the sulfur-to-chloride ratio is 3:1. Nevertheless, one variant on this reaction uses anhydrous ammonia for simplicity:

6 S_{2}Cl_{2} + 16 NH_{3} → S_{4}N_{4} + S_{8} + 12 [NH_{4}]Cl

Coproducts of this reaction include heptasulfur imide (S_{7}NH) and elemental sulfur; the latter equilibrates with more S_{4}N_{4} and ammonium sulfide:

16 S + 16 NH_{3} ↔ S_{4}N_{4} + 12 (NH_{4})S

An alternative synthesis pre-forms S–N bonds with lithium bis(trimethylsilyl)amide and SCl_{2}:

2 ((CH_{3})_{3}Si)_{2}NLi + SCl_{2} → (((CH_{3})_{3}Si)_{2}N)_{2}S + 2 LiCl

The (((CH_{3})_{3}Si)_{2}N)_{2}S then reacts with the combination of SCl_{2} and SO_{2}Cl_{2} to form S_{4}N_{4}, trimethylsilyl chloride, and sulfur dioxide:

2 (((CH_{3})_{3}Si)_{2}N)_{2}S + 2 SCl_{2} + 2 SO_{2}Cl_{2} → S_{4}N_{4} + 8 (CH_{3})_{3}SiCl + 2 SO_{2}

== Acid-base reactions ==
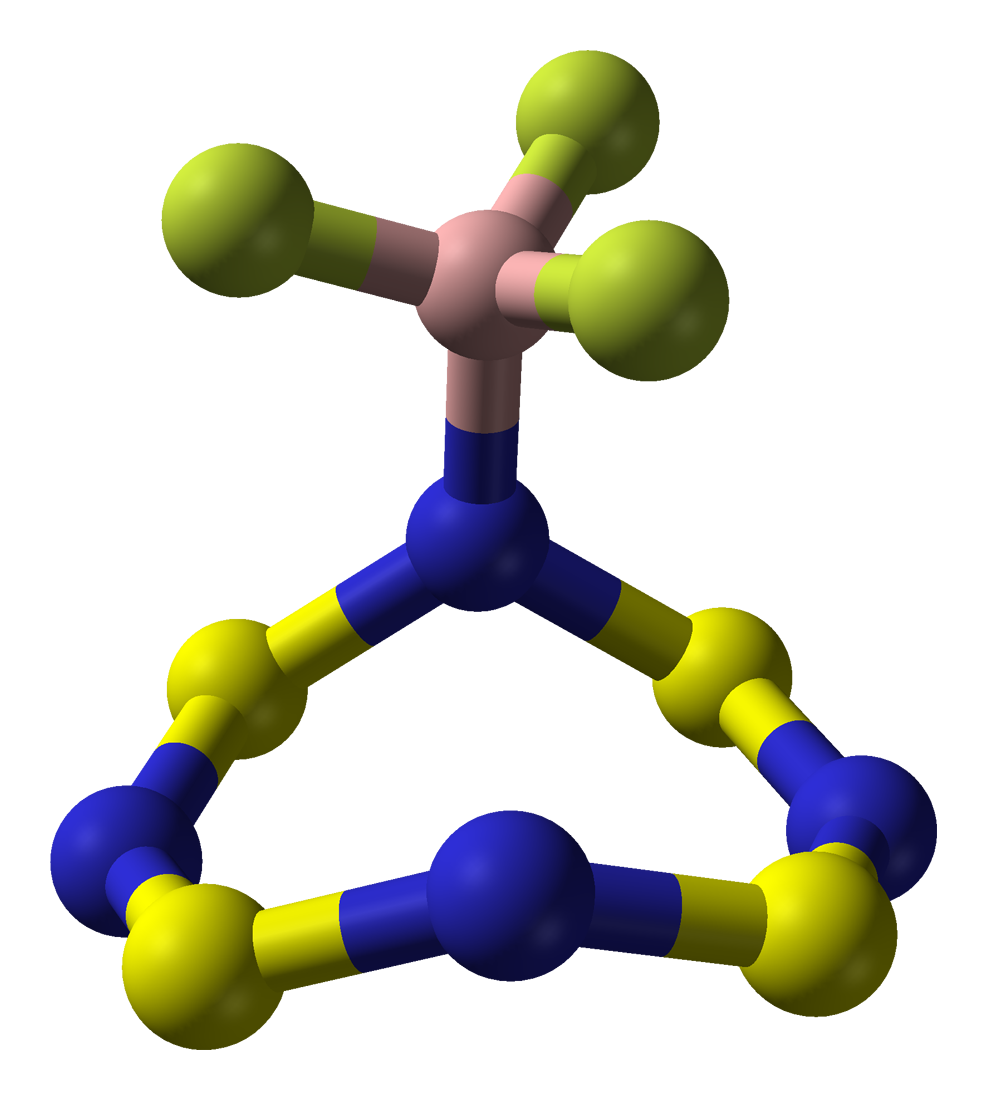
S_{4}N_{4}·BF_{3}

S_{4}N_{4} is a Lewis base at nitrogen. It binds to strong Lewis acids, such as SbCl_{5} and SO_{3}, or H[BF_{4}]:

S_{4}N_{4} + SbCl_{5} → S_{4}N_{4}·SbCl_{5}
S_{4}N_{4} + SO_{3} → S_{4}N_{4}·SO_{3}
S_{4}N_{4} + H[BF_{4}] → [S_{4}N_{4}H]^{+}[BF_{4}]^{−}

The cage is distorted in these adducts.

S_{4}N_{4} reacts with metal complexes, but the bonding situation may be quite complex. The cage remains intact in some cases but in other cases, it is degraded. For example, the soft Lewis acid CuCl forms a coordination polymer:

n S_{4}N_{4} + n CuCl → (S_{4}N_{4})_{n}-μ-(−Cu−Cl−)_{n}

Reportedly, [Pt_{2}Cl_{4}(P(CH_{3})_{2}Ph)_{2}] initially forms a complex with S_{4}N_{4} at sulfur. This compound, upon standing, isomerizes to additionally bond through a nitrogen atom. S_{4}N_{4} oxidatively adds to Vaska's complex ([Ir(Cl)(CO)(PPh_{3})_{2}] to form a hexacoordinate iridium complex where the S_{4}N_{4} binds through two sulfur atoms and one nitrogen atom.

Dilute NaOH hydrolyzes S_{4}N_{4} as follows, yielding thiosulfate and trithionate:

2 S_{4}N_{4} + 6 OH^{−} + 9 H_{2}O → S_{2}O^{2−}_{3} + 2 S_{3}O^{2−}_{6} + 8 NH_{3}

More concentrated base yields sulfite:

S_{4}N_{4} + 6 OH^{−} + 3 H_{2}O → S_{2}O^{2−}_{3} + 2 SO^{2−}_{3} + 4 NH_{3}

== As a precursor to other S-N compounds ==
Many S-N compounds are prepared from S_{4}N_{4}. In the simplest case, (NS)_{2} units insert into a weak, polarized bond:

Me_{3}SiNR_{2} + S_{4}N_{4} → Me_{3}Si-N-S-N-S-NR_{2}

In electrophilic substitution or 1,3-dipolar cycloaddition reactions, S_{4}N_{4} behaves as a combination of the dithionitronium synthon and the sulfide synthon. Thus it adds to unsaturated bonds to give 1,2,5‑thiadiazoles (a 1,3-dipolar cycloaddition). Very electron-poor alkynes also attack S_{4}N_{4} to give a different, 7-membered cycloadduct, corresponding to addition of -S-N-S-N-S- across the triple bond.

Passing gaseous S_{4}N_{4} over silver metal yields the low temperature superconductor polythiazyl or polysulfurnitride (transition temperature (0.26±0.03) K), often simply called "(SN)_{x}". In the conversion, the silver first becomes sulfided, and the resulting Ag_{2}S catalyzes the conversion of the S_{4}N_{4} into the four-membered ring S_{2}N_{2}, which readily polymerizes.

S_{4}N_{4} + 8 Ag → 4 Ag_{2}S + 2 N_{2}
x S_{4}N_{4} → (SN)_{4x}

Alcoholic tin(II) chloride reduces S_{4}N_{4} to (NH)_{4}S_{4}, valence-isoelectronic with octasulfur. Autoxidation does not recover S_{4}N_{4}, but instead polymeric (–S(O)N(H)–)_{∞}.

Oxidation with elemental fluorine or silver(II) fluoride gives N_{4}(SF)_{4}, but milder reagents give S_{4}N^{+}_{3}:

3 S_{4}N_{4} + 2 S_{2}Cl_{2} → 4 [S_{4}N_{3}]^{+}Cl^{−}
S_{4}N_{4} + RC(=O)Cl → [S_{4}N_{3}]^{+}Cl^{−} + RNCO

That cation is relatively non-electrophilic and planar, with a delocalized π system. However, it adds triphenylphosphine to give [S(NPPh_{3})_{3}]^{3+}[Cl^{−}]_{3}, a triimide analogue to sulfur trioxide. Conversely, S_{4}N^{+}_{3} salts react with aluminum azide to recover S_{4}N_{4}.

Treatment with tetramethylammonium azide or other nucleophiles produces the similar 10-π heterocycle [S_{3}N_{3}]^{−}:

8 S_{4}N_{4} + 8 [(CH_{3})_{4}N]^{+}[N_{3}]^{−} → 8 [(CH_{3})_{4}N]^{+}[S_{3}N_{3}]^{−} + S_{8} + 16 N_{2}

Excess S_{4}N_{4} can react with the [S_{3}N_{3}]^{−} to form [S_{4}N_{5}]^{−}.

In a related reaction, the use of the bis(triphenylphosphine)iminium azide gives a salt containing the blue [NS_{4}]^{−} anion:

4 S_{4}N_{4} + 2 [PPN]^{+}[N_{3}]^{−} → 2 [PPN]^{+}[NS_{4}]^{−} + S_{8} + 10 N_{2}

[NS_{4}]^{−} has a chain structure approximated by the resonance [S=S=N−S−S^{−}] ↔ [^{−}S−S−N=S=S].

Reaction with piperidine generates [S_{4}N_{5}]^{−}:

24 S_{4}N_{4} + 32 C_{5}H_{10}NH → 8 [C_{5}H_{10}NH_{2}]^{+}[S_{4}N_{5}]^{−} + 8 (C_{5}H_{10}N)_{2}S + 3 S_{8} + 8 N_{2}

A related cation is also known, i.e. [S_{4}N_{5}]^{+}.

Triphenylphosphine abstracts a sulfur atom, replacing it with another triphenylphosphine moiety:

S_{4}N_{4} + 2 PPh_{3} → S_{3}(PPh_{3})N_{4} + SPPh_{3}

S_{4}N_{4} also reacts with metal salts, forming a wide variety of complexes:

Pb(NO_{3})_{2} + S_{4}N_{4} + NH_{3} → Pb(NH_{3})(S_{2}N_{2}) + ...
Co(CO)_{2}C_{5}H_{5} + S_{4}N_{4} → CoC_{5}H_{5}(S_{2}N_{2}) + ...
VCl_{4} + S_{4}N_{4} → VCl_{2}(S_{2}N_{3}) + VCl_{4}(S_{2}N_{3}) + ...

In all these cases, the product is a metallacycle, with the N-S atoms forming a semicircular bidentate ligand.

== Safety ==
S_{4}N_{4} is a categorized as a primary explosive that is shock and friction sensitive. While comparable to pentaerythritol tetranitrate (PETN) in terms of impact sensitivity, its friction sensitivity is equal to or even lower than lead azide. Purer samples are more shock-sensitive than those contaminated with elemental sulfur.

== Related compounds ==
- The selenium analogue Se_{4}N_{4}, tetraselenium tetranitride.
