= List of UN numbers 1401 to 1500 =

UN numbers from UN1401 to UN1500 as assigned by the United Nations Committee of Experts on the Transport of Dangerous Goods are as follows:

== UN 1401 to UN 1500 ==
UN Number	Class	Proper Shipping Name
UN 1401	4.3	Calcium
UN 1402	4.3	Calcium carbide
UN 1403	4.3	Calcium cyanamide with more than 0.1 percent of calcium carbide
UN 1404	4.3	Calcium hydride
UN 1405	4.3	Calcium silicide
UN 1406	?	(UN No. no longer in use) Calcium-Silicon alloy (UN No. no longer in use)
UN 1407	4.3	Caesium or Cesium
UN 1408	4.3	Ferrosilicon, with 30 percent or more but less than 90 percent silicon
UN 1409	4.3	Metal hydrides, water-reactive, n.o.s.
UN 1410	4.3	Lithium aluminium hydride
UN 1411	4.3	Lithium aluminium hydride, ethereal
UN 1412	?	(UN No. no longer in use) Lithium amide, powdered (UN No. no longer in use)
UN 1413	4.3	Lithium borohydride
UN 1414	4.3	Lithium hydride
UN 1415	4.3	Lithium
UN 1416	?	(UN No. no longer in use)
UN 1417	4.3	Lithium silicon
UN 1418	4.3	Magnesium, powder or Magnesium alloys, powder
UN 1419	4.3	Magnesium aluminium phosphide
UN 1420	4.3	Potassium, metal alloys
UN 1421	4.3	Alkali metal alloys, liquid, n.o.s.
UN 1422	4.3	Potassium sodium alloys
UN 1423	4.3	Rubidium
UN 1424	?	(UN No. no longer in use) Sodium amalgam (UN No. no longer in use)
UN 1425	?	(UN No. no longer in use) Sodium amide (UN No. no longer in use)
UN 1426	4.3	Sodium borohydride
UN 1427	4.3	Sodium hydride
UN 1428	4.3	Sodium
UN 1429	?	(UN No. no longer in use) Sodium metal dispersion in organic solvent (UN No. no longer in use)
UN 1430	?	(UN No. no longer in use)
UN 1431	4.2	Sodium methylate
UN 1432	4.3	Sodium phosphide
UN 1433	4.3	Stannic phosphide
UN 1434	4.2	Strontium
UN 1435	4.3	Zinc ashes
UN 1436	4.3	Zinc powder or Zinc dust
UN 1437	4.1	Zirconium hydride
UN 1438	5.1	Aluminium nitrate
UN 1439	5.1	Ammonium dichromate
UN 1440 to 1441	?	(UN No.s no longer in use)
UN 1442	5.1	Ammonium perchlorate
UN 1443	?	(UN No. no longer in use)
UN 1444	5.1	Ammonium persulfate
UN 1445	5.1	Barium chlorate
UN 1446	5.1	Barium nitrate
UN 1447	5.1	Barium perchlorate
UN 1448	5.1	Barium permanganate
UN 1449	5.1	Barium peroxide
UN 1450	5.1	Bromates, inorganic, n.o.s.
UN 1451	5.1	Caesium nitrate or Cesium nitrate
UN 1452	5.1	Calcium chlorate
UN 1453	5.1	Calcium chlorite
UN 1454	5.1	Calcium nitrate
UN 1455	5.1	Calcium perchlorate
UN 1456	5.1	Calcium permanganate
UN 1457	5.1	Calcium peroxide
UN 1458	5.1	Chlorate and borate mixtures
UN 1459	5.1	Chlorate and Magnesium chloride mixtures, solid
UN 1460	?	(UN No. no longer in use)
UN 1461	5.1	Chlorates, inorganic, n.o.s.
UN 1462	5.1	Chlorites, inorganic, n.o.s.
UN 1463	5.1	Chromium trioxide, anhydrous
UN 1464	?	(UN No. no longer in use)
UN 1465	5.1	Didymium nitrate
UN 1466	5.1	Ferric nitrate
UN 1467	5.1	Guanidine nitrate
UN 1468	?	(UN No. no longer in use)
UN 1469	5.1	Lead nitrate
UN 1470	5.1	Lead perchlorate, solid or Lead perchlorate, solution
UN 1471	5.1	Lithium hypochlorite, dry or Lithium hypochlorite mixtures, dry
UN 1472	5.1	Lithium peroxide
UN 1473	5.1	Magnesium bromate
UN 1474	5.1	Magnesium nitrate
UN 1475	5.1	Magnesium perchlorate
UN 1476	5.1	Magnesium peroxide
UN 1477	5.1	Nitrates, inorganic, n.o.s.
UN 1478	?	(UN No. no longer in use) Sodium nitrate and potash mixtures (UN No. no longer in use)
UN 1479	5.1	Oxidizing solid, n.o.s.
UN 1480	?	(UN No. no longer in use)
UN 1481	5.1	Perchlorates, inorganic, n.o.s.
UN 1482	5.1	Permanganates, inorganic, n.o.s.
UN 1483	5.1	Peroxides, inorganic, n.o.s.
UN 1484	5.1	Potassium bromate
UN 1485	5.1	Potassium chlorate
UN 1486	5.1	Potassium nitrate
UN 1487	5.1	Potassium nitrate and sodium nitrite mixtures
UN 1488	5.1	Potassium nitrite
UN 1489	5.1	Potassium perchlorate, solid or Potassium perchlorate, solution
UN 1490	5.1	Potassium permanganate
UN 1491	5.1	Potassium peroxide
UN 1492	5.1	Potassium persulfate
UN 1493	5.1	Silver nitrate
UN 1494	5.1	Sodium bromate
UN 1495	5.1	Sodium chlorate
UN 1496	5.1	Sodium chlorite
UN 1497	?	(UN No. no longer in use)
UN 1498	5.1	Sodium nitrate
UN 1499	5.1	Sodium nitrate and potassium nitrate mixtures
UN 1500	5.1	Sodium nitrite

n.o.s. = not otherwise specified meaning a collective entry to which substances, mixtures, solutions or articles may be assigned if a) they are not mentioned by name in 3.2 Dangerous Goods List AND b) they exhibit chemical, physical and/or dangerous properties corresponding to the Class, classification code, packing group and the name and description of the n.o.s. entry

== See also ==
- Lists of UN numbers
