= Calcium chlorate =

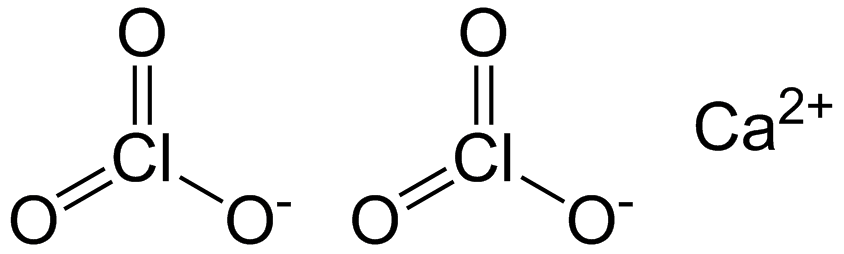

Identifiers
CAS Number	10137-74-3
3D model (JSmol)	Interactive image
ChemSpider	23349
ECHA InfoCard	100.030.331
EC Number	233-378-2
PubChem CID	24978
RTECS number	FN9800000
UNII	2R958OYG8P
CompTox Dashboard (EPA)	DTXSID70894195
- InChI: InChI=1S/Ca.2ClHO3/c;2*2-1(3)4/h;2*(H,2,3,4)/q+2;;/p-2 Key: YALMXYPQBUJUME-UHFFFAOYSA-L; InChI=1/Ca.2ClHO3/c;2*2-1(3)4/h;2*(H,2,3,4)/q+2;;/p-2 Key: YALMXYPQBUJUME-NUQVWONBAM
- SMILES: [Ca+2].[O-]Cl(=O)=O.[O-]Cl(=O)=O

Properties
Chemical formula	Ca(ClO_{3})_{2}
Molar mass	206.97 g·mol^{−1}
Appearance	white solid deliquescent
Odor	odorless
Density	2.71 g/cm^{3}
Melting point	150°C (dihydrate, decomp); 325°C
Solubility in water	209 g/100mL (20 °C); 197 g/100mL (25 °C)

Structure
Crystal structure	monoclinic

Hazards
NFPA 704 (fire diamond)	1 0 1 OX

Related compounds
Other anions	calcium chloride calcium bromate calcium bromide
Other cations	potassium chlorate sodium chlorate barium chlorate magnesium chlorate
- Except where otherwise noted, data are given for materials in their standard state (at 25 °C [77 °F], 100 kPa). verify (what is ?) Infobox references

Calcium chlorate is the calcium salt of chloric acid, with the chemical formula Ca(ClO_{3})_{2}. Like other chlorates, it is a strong oxidizer.

== Production ==
Calcium chlorate is produced by passing chlorine gas through a hot suspension of calcium hydroxide in water, producing calcium hypochlorite, which disproportionates when heated with excess chlorine to give calcium chlorate and calcium chloride:

6 Ca(OH)_{2} + 6 Cl_{2} → Ca(ClO_{3})_{2} + 5 CaCl_{2} + 6 H_{2}O

This is also the first step of the Liebig process for the manufacture of potassium chlorate.

In theory, electrolysis of hot calcium chloride solution will produce the chlorate salt, analogous to the process used for the manufacture of sodium chlorate. In practice, electrolysis is complicated by calcium hydroxide depositing on the cathode, preventing the flow of current.

== Reactions ==
When concentrated solutions of calcium chlorate and potassium chloride are combined, potassium chlorate precipitates:

Ca(ClO_{3})_{2} + 2 KCl → 2 KClO_{3} + CaCl_{2}

This is the second step of the Liebig process for the manufacture of potassium chlorate.

Solutions of calcium chlorate react with solutions of alkali carbonates to give a precipitate of calcium carbonate and the alkali chlorate in solution:

Ca(ClO_{3})_{2} + Na_{2}CO_{3} → 2 NaClO_{3} + CaCO_{3}

On strong heating, calcium chlorate decomposes to give oxygen and calcium chloride:

Ca(ClO_{3})_{2} → CaCl_{2} + 3 O_{2}

Cold, dilute solutions of calcium chlorate and sulfuric acid react to give a precipitate of calcium sulfate and chloric acid in solution:

Ca(ClO_{3})_{2} + H_{2}SO_{4} → 2 HClO_{3} + CaSO_{4}

Contact with strong sulfuric acid can result in explosions due to the instability of concentrated chloric acid. Contact with ammonium compounds can also cause violent decomposition due to the formation of unstable ammonium chlorate.

== Uses ==
Calcium chlorate has been used as an herbicide, like sodium chlorate.

Calcium chlorate is occasionally used in pyrotechnics, as an oxidizer and pink flame colorant. Its hygroscopic nature and incompatibility with other common pyrotechnic materials (such as sulfur) limit its utility in these applications.
