= Chemical decomposition =

Class of chemical reaction

Chemical decomposition

Chemical decomposition, or chemical breakdown, is the process or effect of simplifying a single chemical entity (normal molecule, reaction intermediate, etc.) into two or more fragments. Chemical decomposition is usually regarded and defined as the exact opposite of chemical synthesis. In short, the chemical reaction in which two or more products are formed from a single reactant is called a decomposition reaction.

The details of a decomposition process are not always well defined. Nevertheless, some activation energy is generally needed to break the involved bonds and as such, higher temperatures generally accelerates decomposition. The net reaction can be endothermic, or in the case of spontaneous decompositions, exothermic.

The stability of a chemical compound is eventually limited when it is exposed to environmental conditions such as radiation, humidity, or an acid or base. Because of this chemical decomposition is often an undesired chemical reaction. However chemical decomposition can be desired, such as in various waste treatment processes.

For example, this method is employed for several analytical techniques, notably mass spectrometry, traditional gravimetric analysis, and thermogravimetric analysis. Additionally decomposition reactions are used today for a number of other reasons in the production of a wide variety of products. One of these is the explosive breakdown reaction of sodium azide (NaN_{3}) into nitrogen gas (N_{2}) and sodium (Na). It is this process which powers the life-saving airbags present in virtually all of today's automobiles.

Decomposition reactions can be generally classed into three categories; thermal, electrolytic, and photolytic decomposition reactions.

== Reaction formula ==
In the breakdown of a compound into its constituent parts, the generalized reaction for chemical decomposition is:

AB → A + B (AB represents the reactant that begins the reaction, and A and B represent the products of the reaction)

An example is the electrolysis of water to the gases hydrogen and oxygen:

2 H_{2}O → 2 H_{2} + O_{2}

=== Additional examples ===
A demonstration showing catalytic decomposition of hydrogen peroxide, with MnO_{2} as catalyst. A concentrated hydrogen peroxide solution can be easily decomposed to water and oxygen.

An example of a catalytic decomposition is that of hydrogen peroxide with a catalytic amount of manganese dioxide (MnO_{2}) added, which causes an extremely rapid decomposition to oxygen and water:

2 H_{2}O_{2} → 2 H_{2}O + O_{2}

This reaction is one of the exceptions to the endothermic nature of decomposition reactions.

Other reactions involving decomposition do require the input of external energy. This energy can be in the form of heat, radiation, electricity, or light. The latter being the reason some chemical compounds, such as many prescription medicines, are kept and stored in dark bottles which reduce or eliminate the possibility of light reaching them and initiating decomposition.

When heated, carbonates will decompose. Carbonic acid (H_{2}CO_{3}), commonly seen as the "fizz" in carbonated beverages, will spontaneously decompose over time into carbon dioxide and water over time without external heat:

H_{2}CO_{3} → H_{2}O + CO_{2}

Other carbonates will decompose when heated to produce their corresponding metal oxide and carbon dioxide. The following equation is an example, where M represents the given metal:

MCO_{3} → MO + CO_{2}

A specific example is that involving calcium carbonate:

CaCO_{3} → CaO + CO_{2}

Metal chlorates also decompose when heated. In this type of decomposition reaction, a metal chloride and oxygen gas are the products. Here, again, M represents the metal:

2 MClO_{3} → 2 MCl + 3 O_{2}

A common decomposition of a chlorate is in the reaction of potassium chlorate where oxygen is the product. This can be written as:

2 KClO_{3} → 2 KCl + 3 O_{2}

== See also ==
- Analytical chemistry
- Thermal decomposition
