= Chlorine dioxide =

Structural formula of chlorine dioxide with assorted dimensions
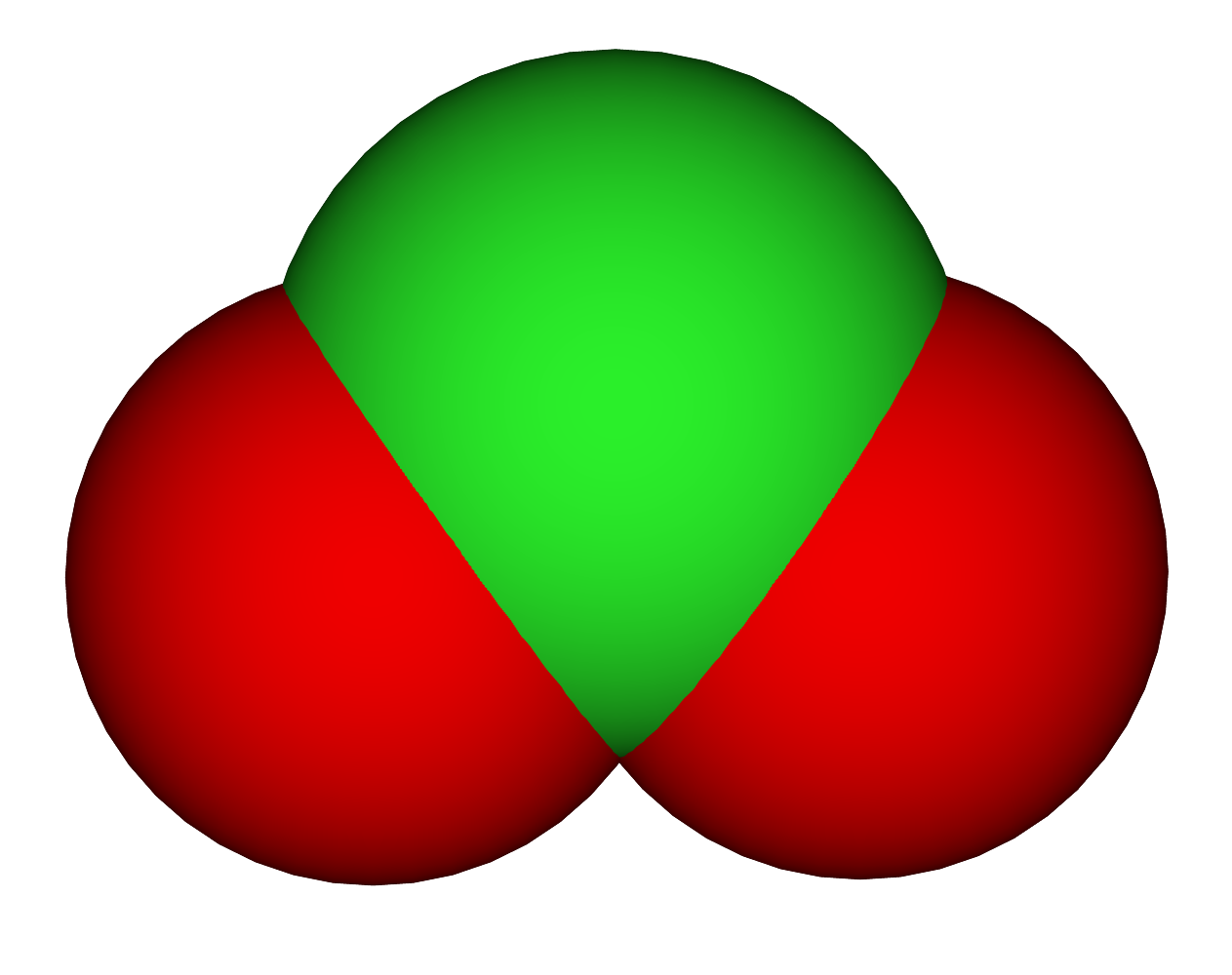
Spacefill model of chlorine dioxide
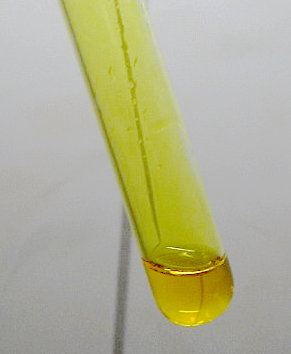

Names
- IUPAC name Dioxygen chloride
- Other names: Chlorine dioxide; Chlorine(IV) oxide

Identifiers
CAS Number	10049-04-4
3D model (JSmol)	Interactive image; Interactive image
ChEBI	CHEBI:29415
ChemSpider	23251
ECHA InfoCard	100.030.135
EC Number	233-162-8
Gmelin Reference	1265
MeSH	Chlorine+dioxide
PubChem CID	24870
RTECS number	FO3000000
UNII	8061YMS4RM
UN number	9191
CompTox Dashboard (EPA)	DTXSID5023958
- InChI: InChI=1S/ClO2/c2-1-3 Key: OSVXSBDYLRYLIG-UHFFFAOYSA-N; InChI=1/ClO2/c2-1-3 Key: OSVXSBDYLRYLIG-UHFFFAOYAC
- SMILES: O=[Cl]=O; O=Cl[O]

Properties
Chemical formula	ClO_{2}
Molar mass	67.45 g·mol^{−1}
Appearance	Yellow to reddish gas
Odor	Acrid, somewhat chlorine-like
Density	2.757 g/dm^{3}
Melting point	−59 °C (−74 °F; 214 K)
Boiling point	11 °C (52 °F; 284 K)
Solubility in water	8 g/L (20 °C (68 °F; 293 K))
Solubility	Soluble in alkaline solutions and sulfuric acid
Vapor pressure	>1 atm
Henry's law constant (k_{H})	4.01×10^{−2} (atm·m^{3})/mol
Acidity (pK_{a})	3.0(5)

Thermochemistry
Std molar entropy (S^{⦵}_{298})	257.22 J/K·mol
Std enthalpy of formation (Δ_{f}H^{⦵}_{298})	104.60 kJ/mol

Hazards
- Occupational safety and health (OHS/OSH)
Main hazards	Highly toxic, corrosive, unstable, powerful oxidizer
- GHS labelling
Pictograms	(GHS03: Oxidizing) (GHS05: Corrosive) (GHS06: Toxic)
Signal word	Danger
Hazard statements	H271, H300+H310+H330, H314, H372
Precautionary statements	P210, P220, P260, P264, P271, P280, P283, P284, P301+P310, P304+P340, P305+P351+P338, P306+P360, P371+P380+P375, P403+P233, P405, P501
NFPA 704 (fire diamond)	3 0 4 OX
- Lethal dose or concentration (LD, LC)
LD_{50} (median dose)	94 mg/kg (oral, rat)
LC_{Lo} (lowest published)	260 ppm (rat, 2 hr)
- NIOSH (US health exposure limits)
PEL (Permissible)	TWA 0.1 ppm (0.3 mg/m^{3})
REL (Recommended)	TWA 0.1 ppm (0.3 mg/m^{3}); ST 0.3 ppm (0.9 mg/m^{3})
IDLH (Immediate danger)	5 ppm
Safety data sheet (SDS)	Safety Data Sheet Archive.
- Except where otherwise noted, data are given for materials in their standard state (at 25 °C [77 °F], 100 kPa). verify (what is ?) Infobox references

Chlorine dioxide is a chemical compound with the formula ClO_{2} that exists as yellowish-green gas above 11 °C (52 °F), a reddish-brown liquid between 11 and −59 °C (52 and −74 °F), and as bright orange crystals below −59 °C (−74 °F). It is usually handled as an aqueous solution. It is commonly used as a bleach. Applications are in food processing and as a disinfectant.

== Structure and bonding ==
The structure according to Pauling's General Chemistry

Vapor-liquid equilibrium above an aqueous solution of chlorine dioxide at various temperatures

Chlorine dioxide is a free radical. A molecule of ClO_{2} has an odd number of valence electrons, and therefore it is paramagnetic. It is an unusual "example of an odd-electron molecule stable toward dimerization" (nitric oxide being another example).

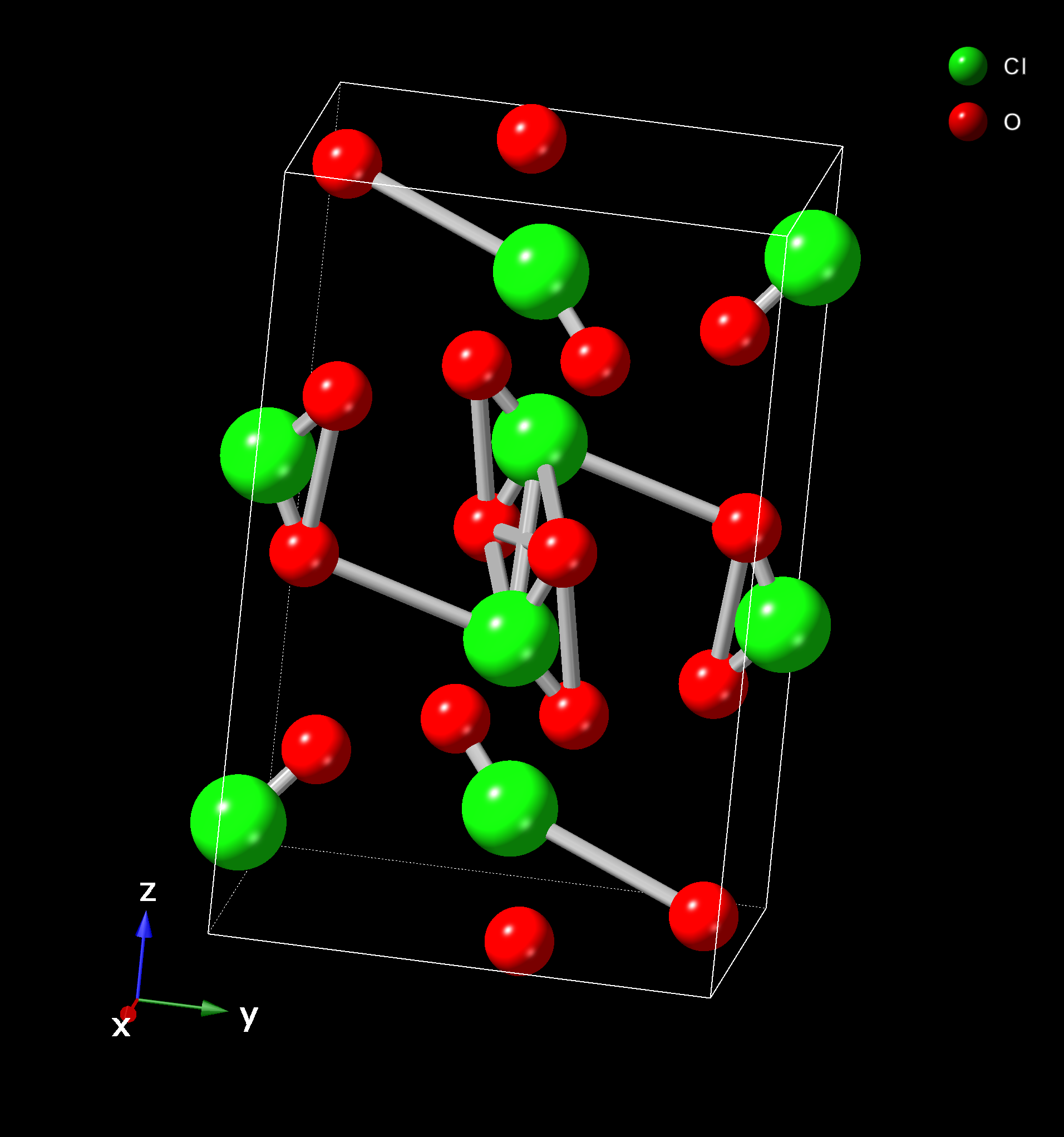
A unit cell of the orthorhombic ClO_{2} crystal shown in an arbitrary direction.

ClO_{2} crystallizes in the orthorhombic Pbca space group.

== History ==
Chlorine dioxide was first prepared in 1811 by Sir Humphry Davy.

In 1933, Lawrence O. Brockway, a graduate student of Linus Pauling, proposed a structure that involved a three-electron bond and two single bonds. However, Pauling in his General Chemistry shows a double bond to one oxygen and a single bond plus a three-electron bond to the other. The valence bond structure would be represented as the resonance hybrid depicted by Pauling. The three-electron bond represents a bond that is weaker than the double bond. In molecular orbital theory this idea is commonplace if the third electron occupies an anti-bonding orbital. Later work has confirmed that the highest occupied molecular orbital is indeed an incompletely filled antibonding orbital.

== Preparation ==
The reaction of chlorine with oxygen under conditions of flash photolysis in the presence of ultraviolet light results in trace amounts of chlorine dioxide formation.

Cl_{2} + 2 O_{2} 2 ClO_{2} ↑

Chlorine dioxide can decompose violently when separated from diluting substances. As a result, preparation methods that involve producing solutions of it without going through a gas-phase stage are often preferred.

=== Oxidation of chlorite ===
In the laboratory, ClO_{2} can be prepared by oxidation of sodium chlorite with chlorine:

NaClO_{2} + 1/2 Cl_{2} → ClO_{2} + NaCl

Traditionally, chlorine dioxide for disinfection applications has been made from sodium chlorite or the sodium chlorite–hypochlorite method:

2 NaClO_{2} + 2 HCl + NaOCl → 2 ClO_{2} + 3 NaCl + H_{2}O

or the sodium chlorite–hydrochloric acid method:

5 NaClO_{2} + 4 HCl → 5 NaCl + 4 ClO_{2} + 2 H_{2}O

or the chlorite–sulfuric acid method:

4 ClO^{−}_{2} + 2 H_{2}SO_{4} → 2 ClO_{2} + HClO_{3} + 2 SO^{2−}_{4} + H_{2}O + HCl

All three methods can produce chlorine dioxide with high chlorite conversion yield. Unlike the other processes, the chlorite–sulfuric acid method is completely chlorine-free, although it suffers from the requirement of 25% more chlorite to produce an equivalent amount of chlorine dioxide. Alternatively, hydrogen peroxide may be efficiently used in small-scale applications.

=== Reduction of chlorate ===
Addition of sulfuric acid or any strong acid to chlorate salts produces chlorine dioxide.

In the laboratory, chlorine dioxide can also be prepared by reaction of potassium chlorate with oxalic acid:

KClO_{3} + H_{2}C_{2}O_{4} → 1/2 K_{2}C_{2}O_{4} + ClO_{2} + CO_{2} + H_{2}O

or with oxalic and sulfuric acid:

KClO_{3} + 1/2 H_{2}C_{2}O_{4} + H_{2}SO_{4} → KHSO_{4} + ClO_{2} + CO_{2} + H_{2}O

Over 95% of the chlorine dioxide produced in the world today is made by reduction of sodium chlorate, for use in pulp bleaching. It is produced with high efficiency in a strong acid solution with a suitable reducing agent such as methanol, hydrogen peroxide, hydrochloric acid or sulfur dioxide. Modern technologies are based on methanol or hydrogen peroxide, as these chemistries allow the best economy and do not co-produce elemental chlorine. The overall reaction can be written as:

chlorate + acid + reducing agent → chlorine dioxide + by-products

As a typical example, the reaction of sodium chlorate with hydrochloric acid in a single reactor is believed to proceed through the following pathway:

ClO^{−}_{3} + Cl^{−} + H^{+} → ClO^{−}_{2} + HOCl
ClO^{−}_{3} + ClO^{−}_{2} + 2 H^{+} → 2 ClO_{2} + H_{2}O
HOCl + Cl^{−} + H^{+} → Cl_{2} + H_{2}O

which gives the overall reaction

ClO^{−}_{3} + Cl^{−} + 2 H^{+} → ClO_{2} + 1/2 Cl_{2} + H_{2}O.

The commercially more important production route uses methanol as the reducing agent and sulfuric acid for the acidity. Two advantages of not using the chloride-based processes are that there is no formation of elemental chlorine, and that sodium sulfate, a valuable chemical for the pulp mill, is a side-product. These methanol-based processes provide high efficiency and can be made very safe.

The variant process using sodium chlorate, hydrogen peroxide and sulfuric acid has been increasingly used since 1999 for water treatment and other small-scale disinfection applications, since it produce a chlorine-free product at high efficiency, over 95%.

=== Other processes ===
Very pure chlorine dioxide can also be produced by electrolysis of a chlorite solution:

NaClO_{2} + H_{2}O → ClO_{2} + NaOH + 1/2 H_{2}

High-purity chlorine dioxide gas (7.7% in air or nitrogen) can be produced by the gas–solid method, which reacts dilute chlorine gas with solid sodium chlorite:

NaClO_{2} + 1/2 Cl_{2} → ClO_{2} + NaCl

== Handling properties ==
Chlorine dioxide is very different from elemental chlorine. One of the most important qualities of chlorine dioxide is its high water solubility, especially in cold water. Chlorine dioxide does not react with water; it remains a dissolved gas in solution. Chlorine dioxide is approximately 10 times more soluble in water than elemental chlorine but its solubility is very temperature-dependent.

At partial pressures above 10 kPa (1.5 psi) (or gas-phase concentrations greater than 10% volume in air at STP) of ClO_{2} may explosively decompose into chlorine and oxygen. The decomposition can be initiated by light, hot spots, chemical reaction, or pressure shock. Thus, chlorine dioxide is never handled as a pure gas, but is almost always handled in an aqueous solution in concentrations between 0.5 and 10 g/L. Its solubility increases at lower temperatures, so it is common to use chilled water (5 °C (41 °F)) when storing at concentrations above 3 grams per liter. In many countries, such as the United States, chlorine dioxide may not be transported at any concentration and is instead almost always produced on-site. In some countries, chlorine dioxide solutions below 3 g/L in concentration may be transported by land, but they are relatively unstable and deteriorate quickly.

== Uses ==
Chlorine dioxide is used for bleaching of wood pulp and for the disinfection (called chlorination) of municipal drinking water, treatment of water in oil and gas applications, disinfection in the food industry, microbiological control in cooling towers, and textile bleaching. As a disinfectant, it is effective even at low concentrations because of its unique qualities.

=== Bleaching ===
Chlorine dioxide is sometimes used for bleaching of wood pulp in combination with chlorine, but it is used alone in ECF (elemental chlorine-free) bleaching sequences. It is used at moderately acidic pH (3.5 to 6). The use of chlorine dioxide minimizes the amount of organochlorine compounds produced. As of 2005, chlorine dioxide (ECF technology) is the most important bleaching method worldwide. About 95% of all bleached kraft pulp is made using chlorine dioxide in ECF bleaching sequences.

Chlorine dioxide has also been used to bleach flour.

=== Water treatment ===
The water treatment plant at Niagara Falls, New York first used chlorine dioxide for drinking water treatment in 1944 for destroying "taste and odor producing phenolic compounds." Chlorine dioxide was introduced as a drinking water disinfectant on a large scale in 1956, when Brussels, Belgium, changed from chlorine to chlorine dioxide. Its most common use in water treatment is as a pre-oxidant prior to chlorination of drinking water to destroy natural water impurities that would otherwise produce trihalomethanes upon exposure to free chlorine. Trihalomethanes are suspected carcinogenic disinfection by-products associated with chlorination of naturally occurring organics in raw water. Chlorine dioxide also produces 70% fewer halomethanes in the presence of natural organic matter compared to when elemental chlorine or bleach is used.

Chlorine dioxide is also superior to chlorine when operating above pH 7, in the presence of ammonia and amines, and for the control of biofilms in water distribution systems. Chlorine dioxide is used in many industrial water treatment applications as a biocide, including cooling towers, process water, and food processing.

Chlorine dioxide is less corrosive than chlorine and superior for the control of Legionella bacteria. Chlorine dioxide is superior to some other secondary water disinfection methods, in that chlorine dioxide is not negatively impacted by pH, does not lose efficacy over time, because the bacteria will not grow resistant to it, and is not negatively impacted by silica and phosphates, which are commonly used potable water corrosion inhibitors. In the United States, it is an EPA-registered biocide.

It is more effective as a disinfectant than chlorine in most circumstances against waterborne pathogenic agents such as viruses, bacteria, and protozoa – including the cysts of Giardia and the oocysts of Cryptosporidium.

The use of chlorine dioxide in water treatment leads to the formation of the by-product chlorite, which is limited to a maximum of 1 part per million in drinking water in the USA. This EPA standard limits the use of chlorine dioxide in the US to relatively high-quality water, because this minimizes chlorite concentration, or water that is to be treated with iron-based coagulants, because iron can reduce chlorite to chloride. The World Health Organization also advises a 1ppm dosification.

=== Use in public crises ===
Chlorine dioxide has many applications as an oxidizer or disinfectant. Chlorine dioxide can be used for air disinfection and was the principal agent used in the decontamination of buildings in the United States after the 2001 anthrax attacks. After the disaster of Hurricane Katrina in New Orleans, Louisiana, and the surrounding Gulf Coast, chlorine dioxide was used to eradicate dangerous mold from houses inundated by the flood water.

In addressing the COVID-19 pandemic, the U.S. Environmental Protection Agency has posted a list of many disinfectants that meet its criteria for use in environmental measures against the causative coronavirus. Some are based on sodium chlorite that is activated into chlorine dioxide, though differing formulations are used in each product. Many other products on the EPA list contain sodium hypochlorite, which is similar in name but should not be confused with sodium chlorite because they have very different modes of chemical action.

=== Other disinfection uses ===
Chlorine dioxide may be used as a fumigant treatment to "sanitize" fruits such as blueberries, raspberries, and strawberries that develop molds and yeast.

Chlorine dioxide may be used to disinfect poultry by spraying or immersing it after slaughtering.

Chlorine dioxide may be used for the disinfection of endoscopes, such as under the trade name Tristel. It is also available in a trio consisting of a preceding pre-clean with surfactant and a succeeding rinse with deionized water and a low-level antioxidant.

Chlorine dioxide may be used for control of zebra and quagga mussels in water intakes.

Chlorine dioxide was shown to be effective in bedbug eradication.

For water purification during camping, disinfecting tablets containing chlorine dioxide are more effective against pathogens than those using household bleach, but typically cost more.

=== Other uses ===
Chlorine dioxide is used as an oxidant for destroying phenols in wastewater streams and for odor control in the air scrubbers of animal byproduct (rendering) plants. It is also available for use as a deodorant for cars and boats, in chlorine dioxide-generating packages that are activated by water and left in the boat or car overnight.

In dilute concentrations, chlorine dioxide is an ingredient that acts as an antiseptic agent in some mouthwashes.

== Safety issues in water and supplements ==
Potential hazards with chlorine dioxide include poisoning and the risk of spontaneous ignition or explosion on contact with flammable materials.

Chlorine dioxide is toxic, and limits on human exposure are required to ensure its safe use. The United States Environmental Protection Agency has set a maximum level of 0.8 mg/L for chlorine dioxide in drinking water. The Occupational Safety and Health Administration (OSHA), an agency of the United States Department of Labor, has set an 8-hour permissible exposure limit of 0.1 ppm in air (0.3 mg/m^{3}) for people working with chlorine dioxide.

Chlorine dioxide has been fraudulently and illegally marketed as an ingestible cure for a wide range of conditions, including autism and coronavirus. Children who have been given enemas of chlorine dioxide as a supposed cure for autism have experienced life-threatening complications. The U.S. Food and Drug Administration (FDA) has stated that ingestion or other internal use of chlorine dioxide, outside of supervised oral rinsing using dilute concentrations, has no health benefits of any kind, and it should not be used internally for any reason.
