= Exploding trousers =

Phenomenon where trousers burst into flames

In New Zealand in the 1930s, farmers reportedly had trouble with exploding trousers as a result of attempts to control ragwort, an agricultural weed.

Farmers had been spraying sodium chlorate, a government recommended weedkiller, onto the ragwort, and some of the spray had ended up on their clothes. Sodium chlorate is a strong oxidizing agent, and reacted with the organic fibres (i.e., the wool and the cotton) of the clothes. Reports had farmers' trousers variously smoldering and bursting into flame, particularly when exposed to heat or naked flames. One report had trousers that were hanging on a washing line starting to smoke. There were also several reports of trousers exploding while farmers were wearing them, causing severe burns.

The history was written up by James Watson of Massey University in a widely reported article, "The Significance of Mr. Richard Buckley's Exploding Trousers" − which later won him an Ig Nobel Prize.

== On television ==
In their May 2006 "Exploding Pants" episode the popular U.S. television show MythBusters investigated the idea that trousers could explode based on the events of New Zealand in the 1930s. Experimenters tested four substances on 100% cotton overalls:

- a paste comprising a mixture of gunpowder and water;
- a "herbicide from the 1930s" which was sodium chlorate, a potentially explosive herbicide used at the time of the events;
- a "fertilizer from the 1930s" which was ammonium nitrate mixed with a liquid fuel (most likely diesel, as an ammonium nitrate bottle, with the label facing the camera, was in the foreground of the shot, in the presence of a red plastic fuel can on the table);
- gun cotton, the common name for nitrocellulose.

Each was put to four different ignition methods: flame, radiant heat, friction, and impact. Although not naming "the herbicide" as sodium chlorate, they confirmed that trousers impregnated therewith would indeed vigorously combust upon exposure to flame, radiant heat, and impact, though their friction tests did not cause ignition. However, combustion (i.e. an exothermic chemical reaction between a fuel and an oxidant) is not the same as an explosion, which involves a rapid increase in volume accompanied by the release of energy in an extreme manner (i.e. a shock wave). Even so, a person witnessing such an event (especially if they were wearing the trousers) would likely describe such a sudden event as an explosion.

The tests also revealed that none of the other three substances caused combustion of the trousers, thus indicating that sodium chlorate was probably a cause for the events that occurred.

== See also ==
- Agriculture in New Zealand
