= Sodium chlorite =

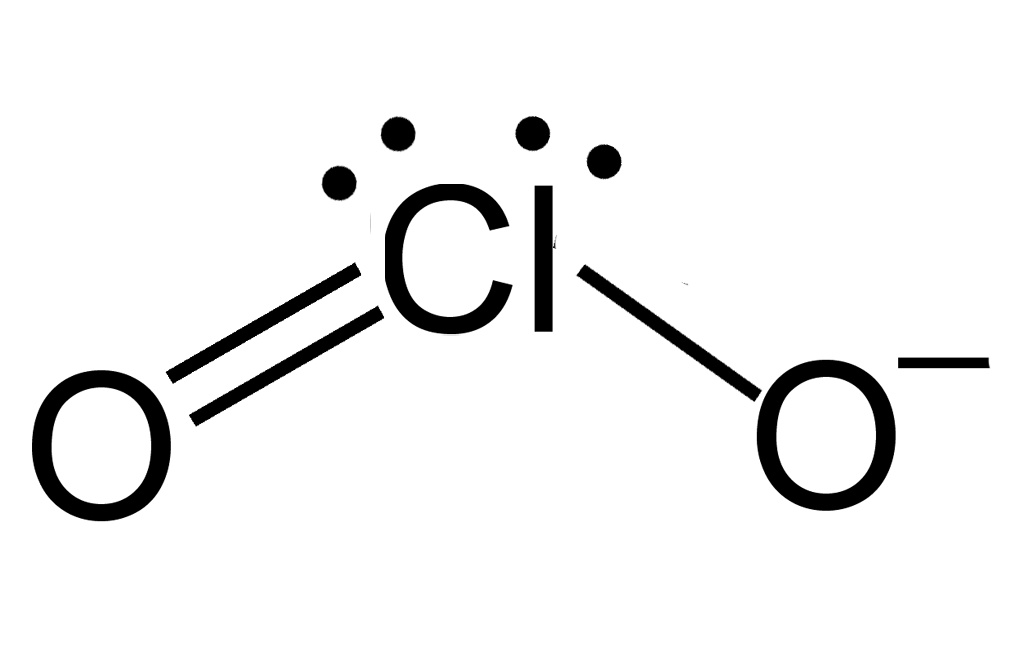

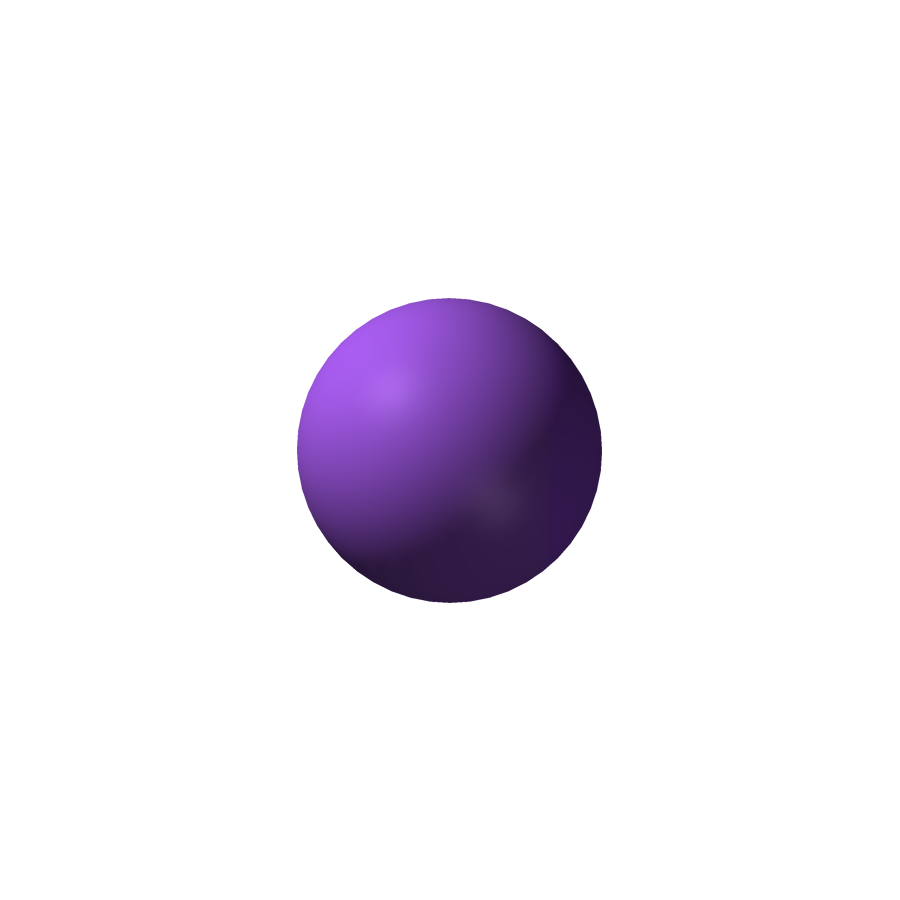
The sodium cation
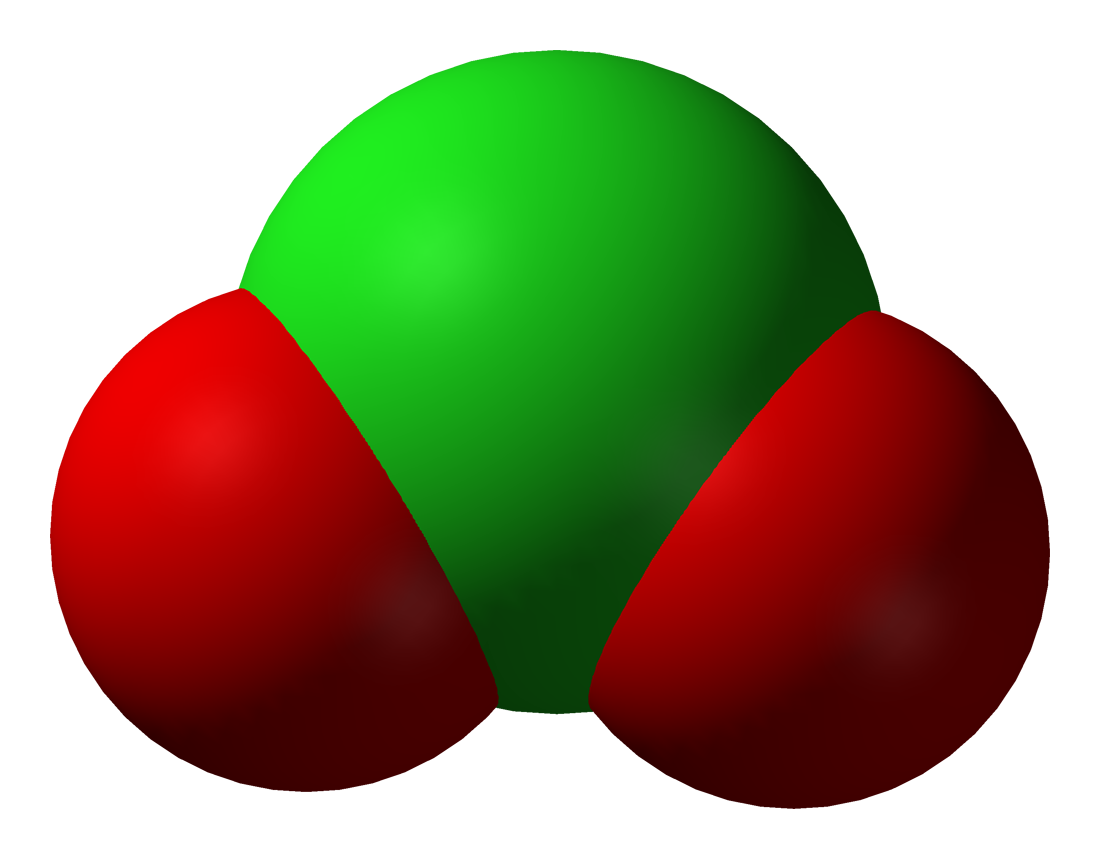
Space-filling model of the chlorite anion
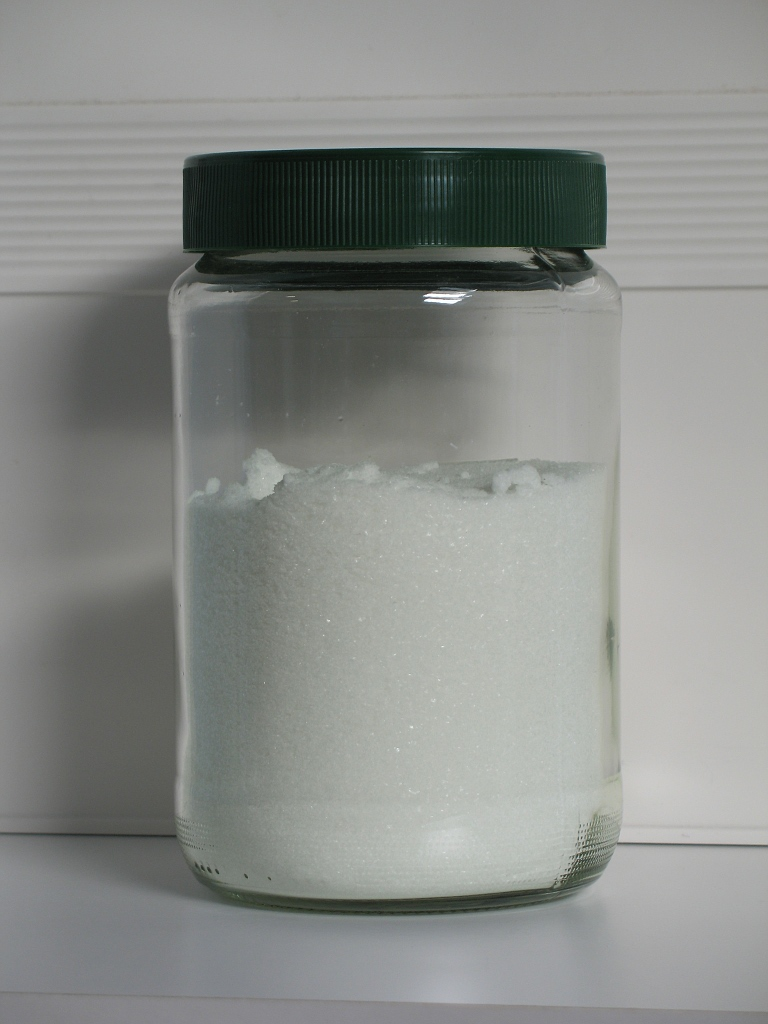

Names
- IUPAC name Sodium chlorite
- Other names Chlorous acid, sodium salt Textone

Identifiers
| CAS Number | 7758-19-2; 49658-21-1 (trihydrate) |
| 3D model (JSmol) | Interactive image |
| ChEBI | CHEBI:78667 |
| ChemSpider | 22860 |
| ECHA InfoCard | 100.028.942 |
| EC Number | 231-836-6 |
| KEGG | C19523 |
| PubChem CID | 23668197 |
| RTECS number | VZ4800000 |
| UNII | G538EBV4VF; F83TIJ81F8 (trihydrate) |
| UN number | 1496 |
| CompTox Dashboard (EPA) | DTXSID8021272 |
- InChI: InChI=1S/ClHO2.Na/c2-1-3;/h(H,2,3);/q;+1/p-1 Key: UKLNMMHNWFDKNT-UHFFFAOYSA-M; InChI=1/ClHO2.Na/c2-1-3;/h(H,2,3);/q;+1/p-1 Key: UKLNMMHNWFDKNT-REWHXWOFAT
- SMILES: [Na+].[O-]Cl=O

Properties
| Chemical formula | NaClO_{2} |
| Molar mass | 90.442 g/mol (anhydrous); 144.487 g/mol (trihydrate) |
| Appearance | white solid |
| Odor | odorless |
| Density | 2.468 g/cm^{3}, solid |
| Melting point | anhydrous decomposes at 180–200 °C trihydrate decomposes at 38 °C |
| Solubility in water | 75.8 g/100 mL (25 °C); 122 g/100 mL (60 °C) |
| Solubility | slightly soluble in methanol, ethanol |
| Acidity (pK_{a}) | 10–11 |

Structure
| Crystal structure | monoclinic |

Thermochemistry
| Std enthalpy of formation (Δ_{f}H^{⦵}_{298}) | −307.0 kJ/mol |

Pharmacology
| ATC code | D03AX11 (WHO) |

Hazards
- Occupational safety and health (OHS/OSH)
| Ingestion hazards | Category 3 |
| Inhalation hazards | Category 2 |
| Eye hazards | Category 1 |
| Skin hazards | Category 1B |
- GHS labelling
| Pictograms | (GHS03: Oxidizing) (GHS05: Corrosive) (GHS06: Toxic) (GHS09: Environmental hazard) |
| Signal word | Danger |
| Hazard statements | H272, H301, H310, H314, H330, H400 |
| Precautionary statements | P210, P220, P221, P260, P262, P264, P270, P271, P273, P280, P284, P301+P330+P331, P303+P361+P353, P305+P351+P338, P310, P361, P363, P370+P378, P391, P403+P233, P405, P501 |
| NFPA 704 (fire diamond) | 2 0 1 OX |
| Flash point | Non-flammable |
- Lethal dose or concentration (LD, LC)
| LD_{50} (median dose) | 350 mg/kg (rat, oral) |
| Safety data sheet (SDS) | SDS |

Related compounds
| Other anions | Sodium chloride Sodium hypochlorite Sodium chlorate Sodium perchlorate |
| Other cations | Potassium chlorite Barium chlorite |
| Related compounds | Chlorine dioxide Chlorous acid |
- Except where otherwise noted, data are given for materials in their standard state (at 25 °C [77 °F], 100 kPa). verify (what is ?) Infobox references

Sodium chlorite (NaClO_{2}) is a chemical compound used in the manufacturing of paper and as a disinfectant.

== Use ==
The main application of sodium chlorite is the generation of chlorine dioxide for bleaching and stripping of textiles, pulp, and paper. It is also used for disinfection of municipal water treatment plants after conversion to chlorine dioxide. An advantage in this application, as compared to the more commonly used chlorine, is that trihalomethanes (such as chloroform) are not produced from organic contaminants. Chlorine dioxide generated from sodium chlorite is approved by FDA under some conditions for disinfecting water used to wash fruits, vegetables, and poultry.

Sodium chlorite, NaClO_{2}, sometimes in combination with zinc chloride, also finds application as a component in therapeutic rinses, mouthwashes, toothpastes and gels, mouth sprays, as preservative in eye drops, and in contact lens cleaning solution under the trade name Purite.

It is also used for sanitizing air ducts and HVAC/R systems and animal containment areas (walls, floors, and other surfaces).

=== Chemical reagent ===
In organic synthesis, sodium chlorite is frequently used as a reagent in the Pinnick oxidation for the oxidation of aldehydes to carboxylic acids. The reaction is usually performed in monosodium phosphate buffered solution in the presence of a chlorine scavenger (usually 2-methyl-2-butene).

In 2005, sodium chlorite was used as an oxidizing agent to convert alkyl furans to the corresponding 4-oxo-2-alkenoic acids in a simple one pot synthesis.

=== Acidified sodium chlorite ===
Mixing sodium chlorite solution with a weak food-grade acid solution (commonly citric acid), both stable, produces short-lived acidified sodium chlorite (ASC) which has potent decontaminating properties. Upon mixing the main active ingredient, chlorous acid is produced in equilibrium with chlorite anion. The proportion varies with pH, temperature, and other factors, ranging from approximately 5–35% chlorous acid with 65–95% chlorite; more acidic solutions result in a higher proportion of chlorous acid. Chlorous acid breaks down to chlorine dioxide which in turn breaks down to chlorite anion and ultimately chloride anion. ASC is used for sanitation of the hard surfaces which come in contact with food and as a wash or rinse for a variety of foods including red meat, poultry, seafood, fruits and vegetables. Because the oxo-chlorine compounds are unstable when properly prepared, there should be no measurable residue on food if treated appropriately. ASC also is used as a teat dip for control of mastitis in dairy cattle.

=== Use in public crises ===
The U.S. Army Natick Soldier Research, Development, and Engineering Center produced a portable "no power required" method of generating chlorine dioxide gas (ClO_{2}), a compound described as being one of the best biocides available for combating contaminants ranging from benign microbes and food pathogens to Category A Bioterror agents. In the weeks after the 9/11 attacks when anthrax was sent in letters to public officials, hazardous materials teams used ClO_{2} to decontaminate the Hart Senate Office Building, and the Brentwood Postal Facility.

In addressing the COVID-19 pandemic, the U.S. Environmental Protection Agency has posted a list of many disinfectants that meet its criteria for use in environmental measures against the causative coronavirus. Some are based on sodium chlorite that is activated into chlorine dioxide, though differing formulations are used in each product. Many other products on the EPA list contain sodium hypochlorite, which is similar in name but should not be confused with sodium chlorite because they have very different modes of chemical action.

== Safety ==
Sodium chlorite, like many oxidizing agents, should be protected from inadvertent contamination by organic materials to avoid the formation of an explosive mixture. The chemical is stable in pure form and does not explode on percussive impact, unless organic contaminants are present, such as on a greasy hammer striking the chemical on an anvil. It also easily ignites by friction if combined with a reducing agent like powdered sugar, sulfur or red phosphorus.

== Toxicity ==
Sodium chlorite is a strong oxidant and can therefore be expected to cause clinical symptoms similar to the well known sodium chlorate: methemoglobinemia, hemolysis, kidney failure. A dose of 10–15 grams of sodium chlorate can be lethal. Methemoglobemia had been demonstrated in rats and cats, and recent studies by the EMEA have confirmed that the clinical symptomatology is very similar to the one caused by sodium chlorate in rats, mice, rabbits, and green monkeys.

There are only a few human cases in the medical literature of chlorite poisoning as of 2025. It seems to confirm that the toxicity is equal to sodium chlorate. From the analogy with sodium chlorate, even small amounts of about 1 gram can be expected to cause nausea, vomiting and even life-threatening hemolysis in glucose-6-phosphate dehydrogenase deficient persons. Renal damage and failure is also common. Typical treatment includes methylene blue administration and hemodialysis, and a full recovery is possible with prompt and intense medical care.

The EPA has set a maximum contaminant level of 1 milligram of chlorite per liter (1 mg/L) in drinking water.

Sellers of "Miracle Mineral Solution", a mixture of sodium chlorite and citric acid also known as "MMS" that is promoted as a cure-all have been convicted, fined, or otherwise disciplined in multiple jurisdictions around the world. MMS products were variously referred to as snake oil and complete quackery. The U.S. Food and Drug Administration has issued multiple warnings against consuming MMS.

== Manufacture ==
The free acid, chlorous acid, HClO_{2}, is only stable at low concentrations. Since it cannot be concentrated, it is not a commercial product. However, the corresponding sodium salt, sodium chlorite, NaClO_{2} is stable and inexpensive enough to be commercially available. The corresponding salts of heavy metals (Ag^{+}, Hg^{+}, Tl^{+}, Pb^{2+}, and also Cu^{2+} and NH_{4}^{+}) decompose explosively with heat or shock.

Sodium chlorite is derived indirectly from sodium chlorate, NaClO_{3}. First, sodium chlorate is reduced to chlorine dioxide, typically in a strong acid solution using reducing agents such as sodium sulfite, sulfur dioxide, or hydrochloric acid. This intermediate is then absorbed into a solution of aqueous sodium hydroxide where another reducing agent converts it to sodium chlorite. Even hydrogen peroxide can be used as the reducing agent, giving oxygen gas as its byproduct rather than other inorganic salts or materials that could contaminate the desired product.

== General references ==
- "Chemistry of the Elements", N.N. Greenwood and A. Earnshaw, Pergamon Press, 1984.
- "Kirk-Othmer Concise Encyclopedia of Chemistry", Martin Grayson, Editor, John Wiley & Sons, Inc., 1985
