= Potassium chlorite =

Chemical compound

Names
- IUPAC name Potassium chlorite

Identifiers
CAS Number	14314-27-3; 13898-47-0 (parent)
3D model (JSmol)	Interactive image
ChemSpider	8466227
MeSH	67063160
PubChem CID	23669246
UNII	71K32L1LFJ
CompTox Dashboard (EPA)	DTXSID90931758
- InChI: InChI=1S/ClHO2.K/c2-1-3;/h(H,2,3);/q;+1/p-1 Key: VISKNDGJUCDNMS-UHFFFAOYSA-M
- SMILES: [O-]Cl=O.[K+]

Properties
Chemical formula	KClO_{2}, ClKO_{2}
Molar mass	106.55 g/mol

Hazards
- GHS labelling
Pictograms	(GHS03: Oxidizing)
Hazard statements	H314
Precautionary statements	P260, P264, P280, P301+P330+P331, P304+P340, P305+P351+P338, P310, P405, P501
- Except where otherwise noted, data are given for materials in their standard state (at 25 °C [77 °F], 100 kPa). Infobox references

Potassium chlorite is a potassium salt of chlorous acid (HClO_{2}) having a chemical formula KClO_{2}. It exists as white powder and its anhydrous form easily undergoes decomposition in presence of heat or radiation (especially gamma rays).

== Properties ==
Potassium chlorite is a colorless hygroscopic crystal that deliquesces in the air. It decomposes upon heating into potassium chloride and oxygen, emitting light.

KClO_{2} → KCl + O_{2}

Potassium chlorite forms orthorhombic cmcm crystals and has been reported to decompose within hours at room temperature. It is an oxidizing agent.

== Synthesis ==
Some of the methods of preparation of potassium chlorite are:

- Thermal decomposition of potassium chlorate

2 KClO_{3} → 2 KClO_{2} + O_{2}

- Reaction of chlorous acid and potassium hydroxide

HClO_{2} + KOH → KClO_{2} + H_{2}O
