= Magnesium chlorate =

Names
- IUPAC name Magnesium dichlorate hexahydrate
- Systematic IUPAC name Magnesium dichlorate
- Other names: Magnesium(II) chlorate

Identifiers
CAS Number	10326-21-3; (dihydrate): 36355-97-2; (hexahydrate): 7791-19-7
3D model (JSmol)	Interactive image; (dihydrate): Interactive image; (hexahydrate): Interactive image
ChemSpider	64853748; (dihydrate): 80564724; (hexahydrate): 128878
ECHA InfoCard	100.030.634
EC Number	233-711-1
PubChem CID	25155; (dihydrate): 71437298; (hexahydrate): 146100
UNII	M536P01U3N
UN number	2723
CompTox Dashboard (EPA)	DTXSID30890653; (hexahydrate): DTXSID30999110
- InChI: InChI=1S/2ClHO3.Mg/c2*2-1(3)4;/h2*(H,2,3,4);/q;;+2/p-2 Key: NNNSKJSUQWKSAM-UHFFFAOYSA-L; (dihydrate): InChI=1S/2ClHO3.Mg.2H2O/c2*2-1(3)4;;;/h2*(H,2,3,4);;2*1H2/q;;+2;;/p-2 Key: YTXOASNCVSJHNM-UHFFFAOYSA-L; (hexahydrate): InChI=1S/2ClHO3.Mg.6H2O/c2*2-1(3)4;;;;;;;/h2*(H,2,3,4);;6*1H2/q;;+2;;;;;;/p-2 Key: XKPLAISKKLSAQQ-UHFFFAOYSA-L
- SMILES: Cl(=O)(=O)[O-].Cl(=O)(=O)[O-].[Mg+2]; (dihydrate): O.O.[Mg+2].[O-]Cl(=O)=O.[O-]Cl(=O)=O; (hexahydrate): O.O.O.O.O.O.[O-]Cl(=O)=O.[O-]Cl(=O)=O.[Mg+2]

Properties
Chemical formula	Mg(ClO_{3})_{2}
Molar mass	191.20 g/mol
Appearance	White crystalline solid
Density	1.747 g/cm^{3} (hexahydrate)
Melting point	35 °C (95 °F; 308 K)
Boiling point	120 °C (248 °F; 393 K) (decomposition)
Solubility in water	114 g/100 ml (0 °C); 123 g/100 ml (10 °C); 135 g/100 ml (20 °C); 155 g/100 ml (30 °C); 178 g/100 ml (50 °C); 242 g/100 ml (60 °C); 268 g/100 ml (100 °C)
Solubility in acetone	Soluble

Structure
Crystal structure	Monoclinic
Space group	P2_{1}/c
Lattice constant	a = 6.39 Å, b = 6.51 Å, c = 13.90 Å α = 90°, β = 100.3°, γ = 90°
Lattice volume (V)	590.1 Å^{3}

Hazards
- GHS labelling
Pictograms	(GHS07: Exclamation mark)
Signal word	Warning
Hazard statements	H302, H332
- Lethal dose or concentration (LD, LC)
LD_{50} (median dose)	6348 mg/kg (rat, oral)

Related compounds
Other cations	Calcium chlorate Strontium chlorate Barium chlorate
- Except where otherwise noted, data are given for materials in their standard state (at 25 °C [77 °F], 100 kPa). Infobox references

Magnesium chlorate refers to inorganic compounds with the chemical formula Mg(ClO_{3})_{2}(H_{2}O)_{x}. The anhydrous (x = 0), dihydrate (x = 2), and hexahydrate (x = 6) are known. These are thermally labile white solids. The hexahydrate has been identified on the Martian surface.

== Production ==
Samples of magnesium chlorate were first claimed in 1920 as the result of treating magnesium oxide with chlorine. A more modern method involves electrolysis of magnesium chloride. The magnesium chlorate can be purified by exploiting its solubility in acetone.

A more simple method of production is the reaction of barium chlorate and magnesium sulfate:

Ba(ClO_{3})_{2} + MgSO_{4} → BaSO_{4}↓ + Mg(ClO_{3})_{2}

The precipitated barium sulfate is filtered to yield a solution of magnesium chlorate, which when evaporated, yields crystals of the hexahydrate.

== Properties ==
The hexahydrate Mg(ClO_{3})_{2}·6H_{2}O decomposes to the tetrahydrate at 35 °C. At 65 °C, it dehydrates to the dihydrate, then at 80 °C forms a basic salt. If further heated to 120 °C it decomposes to water, oxygen, chlorine, and magnesium oxide.

As confirmed by X-ray crystallography, the di- and hexahydrates feature octahedral Mg^{2+} centers. The other ligands are water, exclusively in the hexahydrate. In the dihydrate, chlorate is also coordinated and functions as a bridging ligand.

== Uses ==
Magnesium(II) chlorate is used as a powerful desiccant and a defoliant for cotton, potato, and rice. It is also found as a lubricant in eye drops as an inactive ingredient.

== Hazards ==
Magnesium chlorate is an oxidizer and can in principle form explosive mixtures.
