= Chlorous acid =

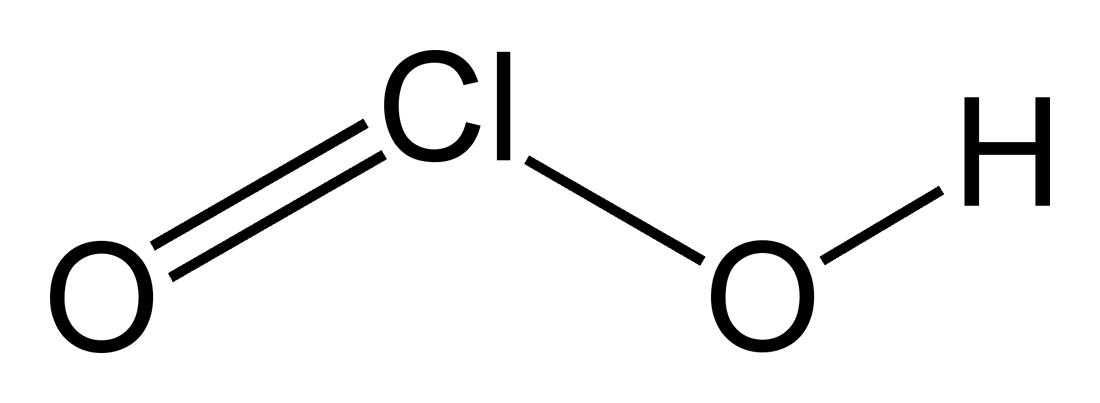
- Chlorous acid

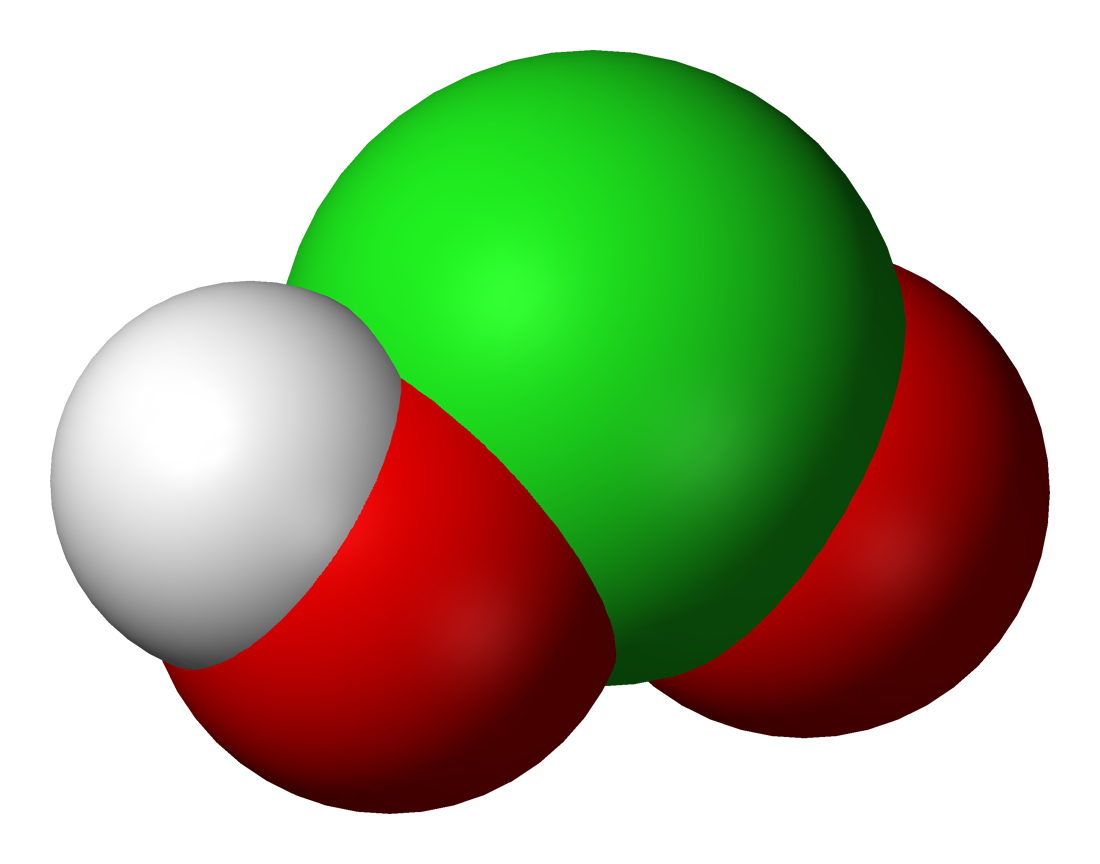
- Chlorous acid

Names
- IUPAC name Chlorous acid, Chloric (III) acid

Identifiers
CAS Number	13898-47-0
3D model (JSmol)	Interactive image
ChEBI	CHEBI:29219
ChemSpider	22861
KEGG	C01486
PubChem CID	24453
UNII	7JRT833T5M
CompTox Dashboard (EPA)	DTXSID80160853
- InChI: InChI=1S/ClHO2/c2-1-3/h(H,2,3) Key: QBWCMBCROVPCKQ-UHFFFAOYSA-N; InChI=1/ClHO2/c2-1-3/h(H,2,3) Key: QBWCMBCROVPCKQ-UHFFFAOYAO
- SMILES: O[Cl+][O-]

Properties
Chemical formula	HClO_{2}
Molar mass	68.46 g·mol^{−1}
Acidity (pK_{a})	1.96
Conjugate base	Chlorite
- Except where otherwise noted, data are given for materials in their standard state (at 25 °C [77 °F], 100 kPa). verify (what is ?) Infobox references

Chlorous acid is an inorganic compound with the formula HClO_{2}. It is a pale-yellow weak acid. Chlorine has oxidation state +3 in this acid. The pure substance is unstable, disproportionating to hypochlorous acid (Cl oxidation state +1) and chloric acid (Cl oxidation state +5):

2 HClO_{2} → HClO + HClO_{3}

Although the acid is difficult to obtain in pure form, the conjugate base, chlorite, derived from this acid is stable. One example of a salt of this anion is the well-known sodium chlorite. This and related salts are sometimes used in the production of chlorine dioxide.

== Preparation ==
HClO_{2} can be prepared through reaction of barium or lead chlorite and dilute sulfuric acid:

Ba(ClO_{2})_{2} + H_{2}SO_{4} → BaSO_{4} + 2 HClO_{2}
Pb(ClO_{2})_{2} + H_{2}SO_{4} → PbSO_{4} + 2 HClO_{2}

== Stability ==
Chlorous acid is a powerful oxidizing agent, although its tendency to undergo disproportionation counteracts its oxidizing potential.

Chlorine is the only halogen to form an isolable acid of formula HXO_{2}. Fluorine is resistant to oxidation, having a −1 oxidation state even in hypofluorous acid, and is thus unable to form fluorous acid, or any higher oxoacids; despite the name, fluorite minerals are chemically fluoride compounds. Neither bromous acid nor iodous acid has ever been isolated. A few salts of bromous acid, bromites, are known, but no iodites.
