= Ammonium chlorate =

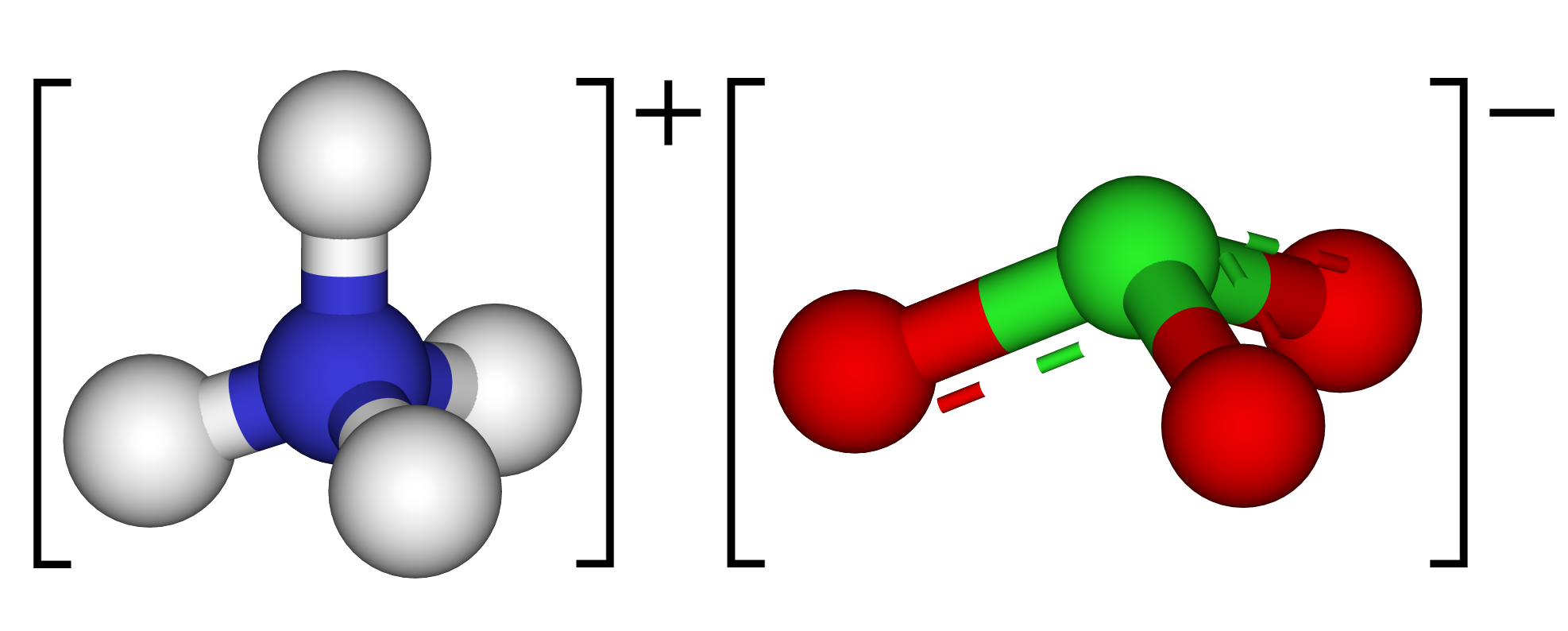
- Ammonium chlorate

Names
- IUPAC name Ammonium chlorate

Identifiers
CAS Number	10192-29-7
3D model (JSmol)	Interactive image
ChemSpider	55411
ECHA InfoCard	100.030.413
PubChem CID	61491
CompTox Dashboard (EPA)	DTXSID90144346
- InChI: InChI=1S/ClHO3.H3N/c2-1(3)4;/h(H,2,3,4);1H3 Key: KHPLPBHMTCTCHA-UHFFFAOYSA-N; InChI=1/ClHO3.H3N/c2-1(3)4;/h(H,2,3,4);1H3 Key: KHPLPBHMTCTCHA-UHFFFAOYAQ
- SMILES: O=Cl(=O)O.N

Properties
Chemical formula	NH_{4}ClO_{3}
Appearance	small colorless crystals
Density	2.42 g/cm^{3}
Melting point	380 °C (716 °F; 653 K) (decomposes)
Magnetic susceptibility (χ)	−42.1·10^{−6} cm^{3}/mol

Hazards
- Occupational safety and health (OHS/OSH)
Main hazards	strong oxidant, decomposes when heated

Related compounds
Other anions	Ammonium chloride Ammonium perchlorate
Other cations	Barium chlorate Potassium chlorate Sodium chlorate
- Except where otherwise noted, data are given for materials in their standard state (at 25 °C [77 °F], 100 kPa). verify (what is ?) Infobox references

Ammonium chlorate is an inorganic compound with the formula NH_{4}ClO_{3}.

It is obtained by neutralizing chloric acid with either ammonia or ammonium carbonate, or by precipitating barium, strontium or calcium chlorates with ammonium carbonate or ammonium sulfate, producing the respective carbonate or sulfate precipitate and an ammonium chlorate solution. Ammonium chlorate crystallizes in small needles, readily soluble in water.

The bitartrate method is a candidate for production and can be used if exotic chlorates are currently inaccessible or need to be synthesized. Warm solutions of potassium chlorate and ammonium bitartrate are needed. The latter can be synthesized by adding aqueous ammonia to an excess of tartaric acid. Then, a double displacement reaction will result in precipitation of ammonium chlorate.

On heating, ammonium chlorate decomposes at about 102 °C, with liberation of nitrogen, chlorine and oxygen. It is soluble in dilute aqueous alcohol, but insoluble in strong alcohol. This compound is a powerful oxidizer and should never be stored with flammable materials, as it can easily form sensitive explosive compositions.

Ammonium chlorate is a very unstable oxidizer and will decompose independently, sometimes violently, at room temperature. This results from the mixture of the reducing ammonium cation and the oxidizing chlorate anion. Even solutions are known to be unstable. Because of the dangerous nature of this salt it should only be kept in solution when needed, and never be allowed to crystallize.

== Production ==
Ammonium chlorate can be made in a double displacement reaction by mixing stoichiometric solutions of ammonium nitrate and sodium chlorate or ammonium sulfate and barium chlorate:

NH_{4}NO_{3} + NaClO_{3} → NH_{4}ClO_{3} + NaNO_{3}
or
(NH_{4})_{2}SO_{4} + Ba(ClO_{3})_{2} → 2NH_{4}ClO_{3} + BaSO_{4}

In addition, ammonium chlorate can be produced by reacting chloric acid with either ammonia or ammonium carbonate:

(NH_{4})_{2}CO_{3} + 2HClO_{3} → 2NH_{4}ClO_{3} + CO_{2} + H_{2}O

== Uses ==
Ammonium chlorate is rarely used due to its hazardous nature, however, in the past it was used in matches due to its ability to oxidise other compounds.
