= Chloric acid =

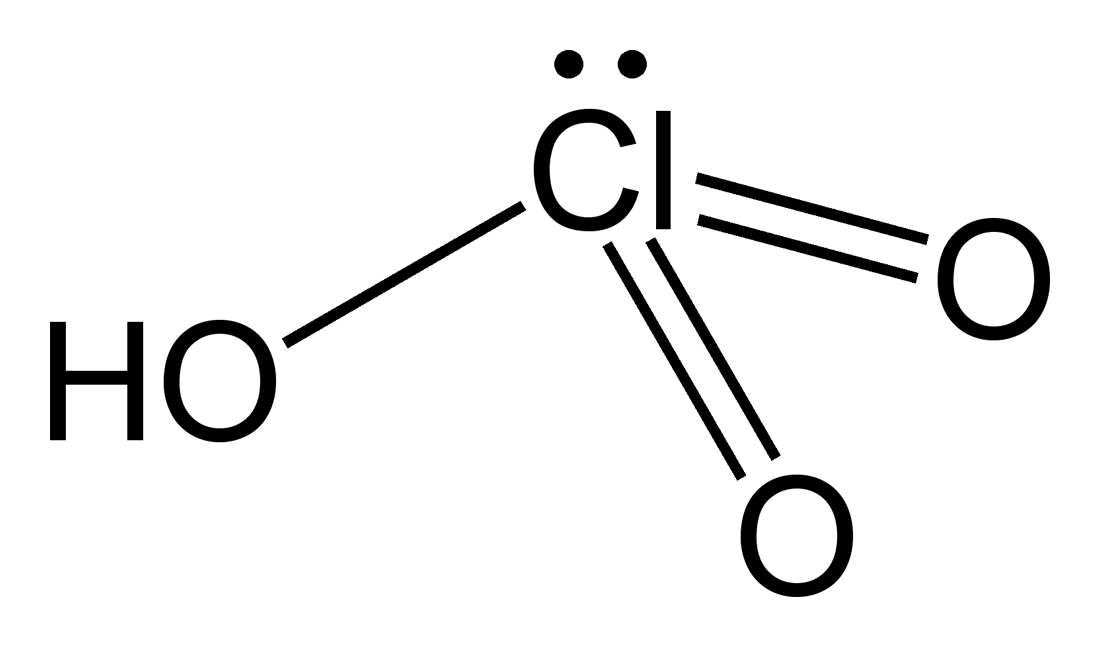
- Chloric acid

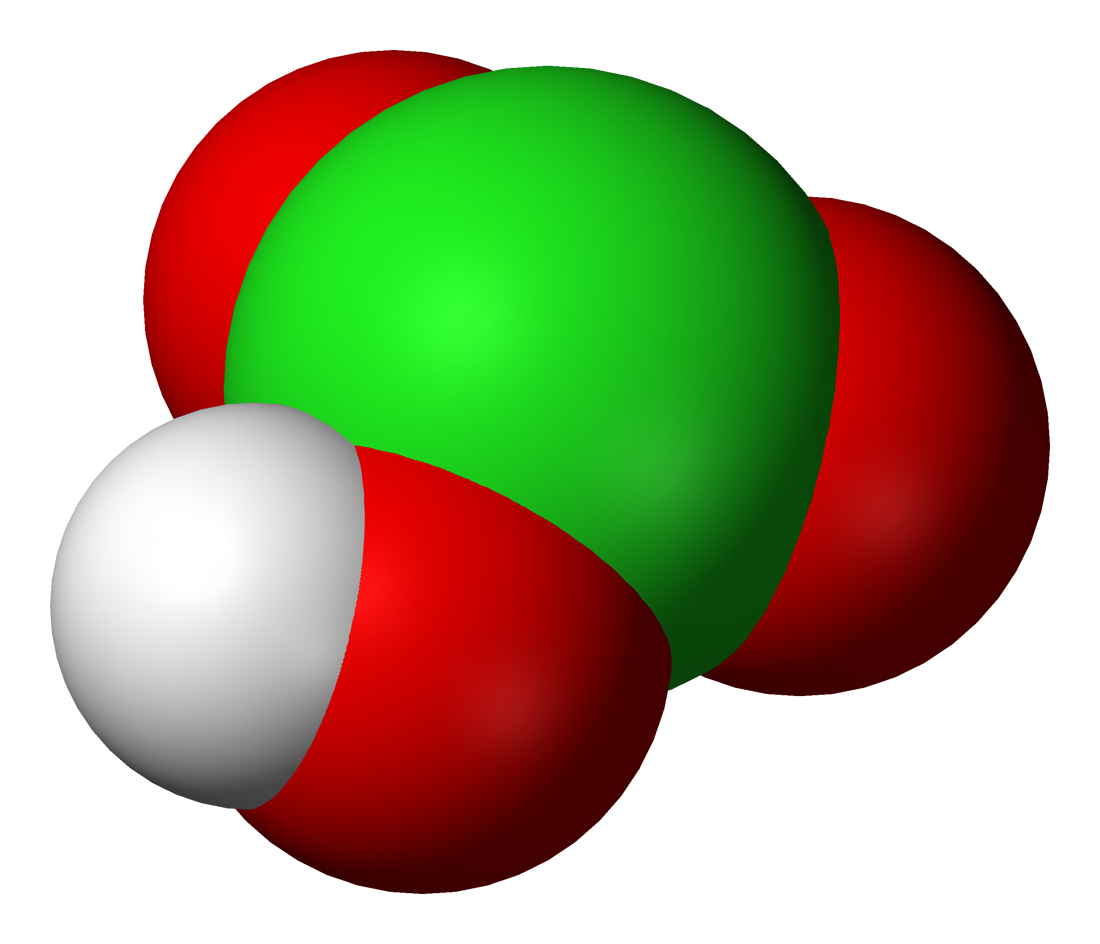
- Chloric acid

Names
- Other names Chloric(V) acid

Identifiers
CAS Number	7790-93-4
3D model (JSmol)	Interactive image
ChemSpider	18513
ECHA InfoCard	100.029.303
EC Number	232-233-0
PubChem CID	19654
UNII	Z0V9L75H3K
UN number	2626
CompTox Dashboard (EPA)	DTXSID1047449
- InChI: InChI=1/ClHO3/c2-1(3)4/h(H,2,3,4) Key: XTEGARKTQYYJKE-UHFFFAOYAG
- SMILES: O[Cl+2]([O-])[O-]

Properties
Chemical formula	HClO_{3}
Molar mass	84.46 g·mol^{−1}
Appearance	colourless solution
Density	1 g/mL, solution (approximate)
Solubility in water	>40 g/100ml (20 °C (68 °F; 293 K))
Acidity (pK_{a})	−2.7
Conjugate base	Chlorate

Structure
Molecular shape	pyramidal

Hazards
- Occupational safety and health (OHS/OSH)
Main hazards	Oxidant, Corrosive
- GHS labelling
Pictograms	(GHS03: Oxidizing) (GHS05: Corrosive)
Signal word	Danger
Hazard statements	H271, H314
Precautionary statements	P210, P220, P221, P260, P264, P280, P283, P301+P330+P331, P303+P361+P353, P304+P340, P305+P351+P338, P306+P360, P310, P321, P363, P370+P378, P371+P380+P375, P405, P501
NFPA 704 (fire diamond)	3 0 2 OX

Related compounds
Other anions	Bromic acid; Iodic acid
Other cations	Ammonium chlorate; Sodium chlorate; Potassium chlorate
Related compounds	Hydrochloric acid; Hypochlorous acid; Chlorous acid; Perchloric acid
- Except where otherwise noted, data are given for materials in their standard state (at 25 °C [77 °F], 100 kPa). Infobox references

Chloric acid, or HClO_{3}, is an oxoacid of chlorine, and the formal precursor of chlorate salts. It is a strong acid and an oxidizing agent.

== Properties ==
Chloric acid is thermodynamically unstable with respect to disproportionation.

Chloric acid is stable in cold aqueous solution up to a concentration of approximately 30%, and solution of up to 40% can be prepared by careful evaporation under reduced pressure. Above these concentrations, chloric acid solutions decompose to give a variety of products, for example:

8 HClO_{3} → 4 HClO_{4} + 2 H_{2}O + 2 Cl_{2} + 3 O_{2}
3 HClO_{3} → HClO_{4} + H_{2}O + 2 ClO_{2}

When it reacts with suitable cations, it forms chlorate (ClO_{3}) salts.

== Production ==
Chloric acid may be produced from barium chlorate through its reaction with sulfuric acid, resulting in a solution of chloric acid and insoluble barium sulfate precipitate:

Ba(ClO_{3})_{2} + H_{2}SO_{4} → 2 HClO_{3} + BaSO_{4}

The chlorate must be dissolved in boiling water and the acid should be somewhat diluted in water and heated before mixing.

Another method which can be used to produce solutions up to 10% concentration is by the use of cation exchange resins and a soluble salt such as NaClO_{3}, where the Na+ cation will exchange with H+.

Another method is the heating of hypochlorous acid, producing chloric acid and hydrogen chloride:

3 HClO → HClO_{3} + 2 HCl

The acid may be concentrated up to 40% in a vacuum dessicator over H_{2}SO_{4}.

== Hazards ==
Chloric acid is a powerful oxidizing agent which ignites most organic materials on contact. It is also corrosive.

== See also ==
- Chlorate
- Hypochlorous acid
- Chlorous acid
- Perchloric acid
- Oxidizing acid
- Dichlorine pentoxide

== Additional Information ==
- Greenwood, Norman N.; Earnshaw, Alan (1997). Chemistry of the Elements (2nd ed.). Butterworth-Heinemann. doi:10.1016/C2009-0-30414-6. ISBN 978-0-08-037941-8.
- R. Bruce King, ed. (1994). "Chloric acid". Encyclopedia of Inorganic Chemistry. Vol. 2. Chichester: Wiley. p. 658. ISBN 0-471-93620-0.
