= Chlorite =

Ion or compound containing chlorine

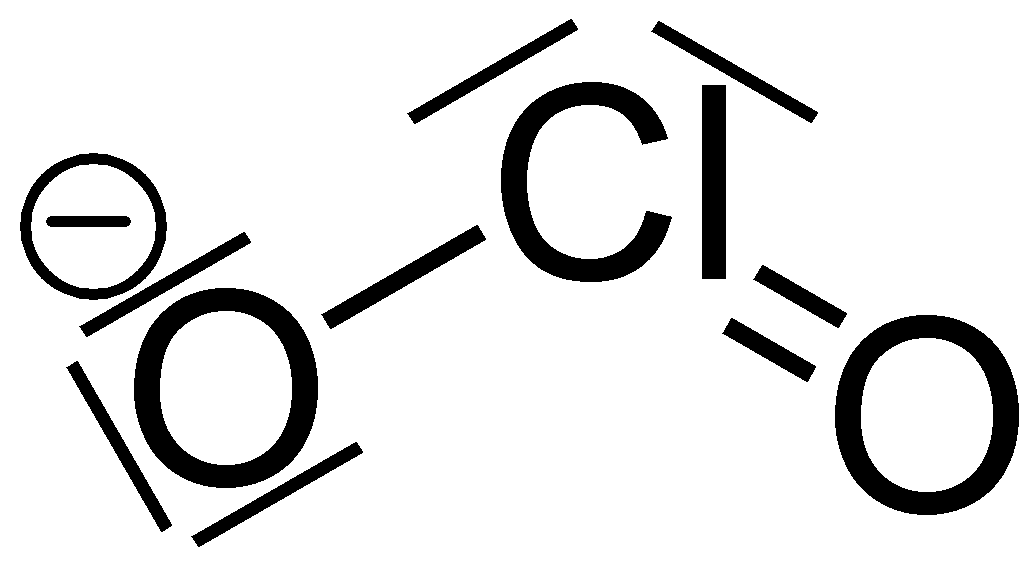
- The chlorite ion

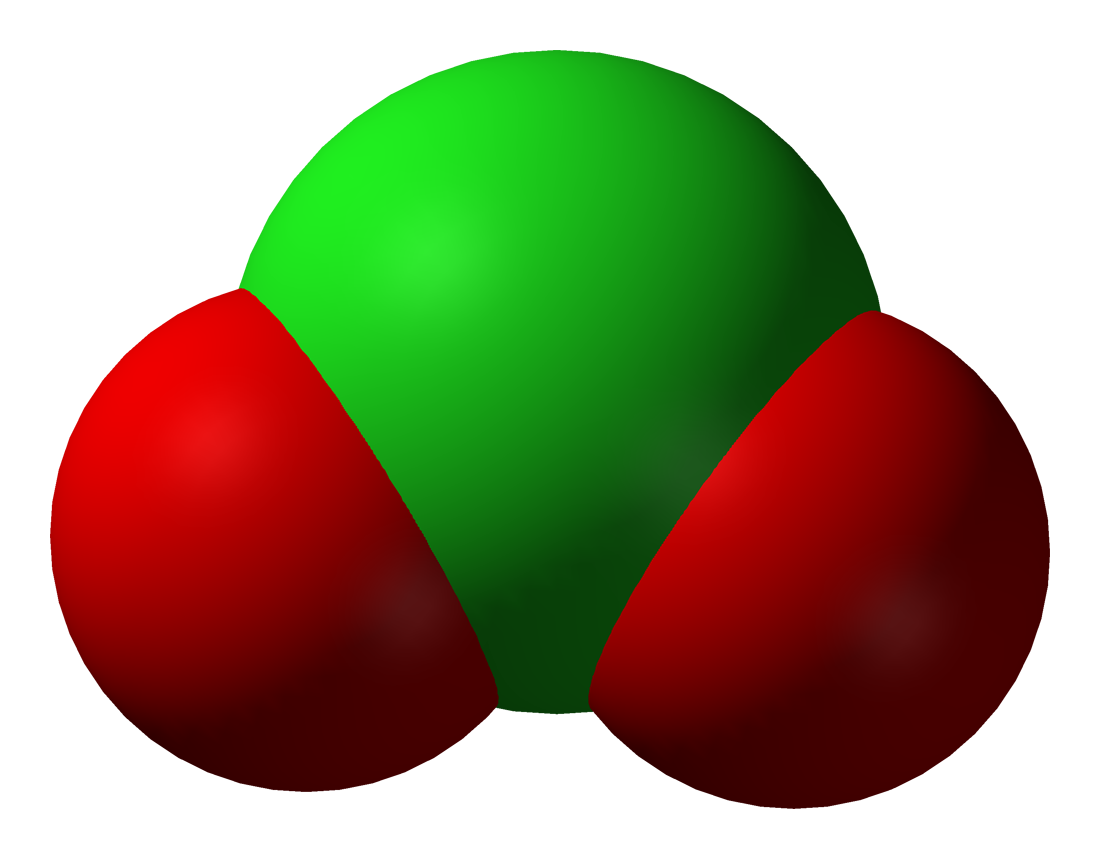
- The chlorite ion

Names
- IUPAC name Chlorite

Identifiers
CAS Number	14998-27-7
3D model (JSmol)	Interactive image
ChemSpider	170734
ECHA InfoCard	100.123.477
EC Number	215-285-9
PubChem CID	197148
UNII	Z63H374SB6
CompTox Dashboard (EPA)	DTXSID7021522
- InChI: InChI=1S/ClHO2/c2-1-3/h(H,2,3)/p-1 Key: QBWCMBCROVPCKQ-UHFFFAOYSA-M
- SMILES: [O-][Cl+][O-]

Properties
Chemical formula	ClO^{−}_{2}
Molar mass	67.452
Conjugate acid	Chlorous acid
- Except where otherwise noted, data are given for materials in their standard state (at 25 °C [77 °F], 100 kPa). Infobox references

The chlorite ion, or chlorine dioxide anion, is the halite with the chemical formula of ClO^{−}_{2}. A chlorite (compound) is a compound that contains this group, with chlorine in the oxidation state of +3. Chlorites are also known as salts of chlorous acid.

== Compounds ==
The free acid, chlorous acid HClO_{2}, is the least stable oxoacid of chlorine and has only been observed as an aqueous solution at low concentrations. Since it cannot be concentrated, it is not a commercial product. The alkali metal and alkaline earth metal compounds are all colorless or pale yellow, with sodium chlorite (NaClO_{2}) being the only commercially important chlorite. Heavy metal chlorites (Ag^{+}, Hg^{+}, Tl^{+}, Pb^{2+}, and also Cu^{2+} and NH^{+}_{4}) are unstable and decompose explosively with heat or shock.

== Structure and properties ==
The chlorite ion adopts a bent molecular geometry, due to the effects of the lone pairs on the chlorine atom, with an O–Cl–O bond angle of 111° and Cl–O bond lengths of 156 pm. Chlorite is the strongest oxidiser of the chlorine oxyanions on the basis of standard half cell potentials.

Ion	Acidic reaction	E° (V)	Neutral/basic reaction	E° (V)
Hypochlorite	H^{+} + HOCl + e^{−} → 1/2 Cl_{2}(g) + H_{2}O	1.63	ClO^{−} + H_{2}O + 2 e^{−} → Cl^{−} + 2 OH^{−}	0.89
Chlorite	3 H^{+} + HOClO + 3 e^{−} → 1/2 Cl_{2}(g) + 2 H_{2}O	1.64	ClO^{−}_{2} + 2 H_{2}O + 4 e^{−} → Cl^{−} + 4 OH^{−}	0.78
Chlorate	6 H^{+} + ClO^{−}_{3} + 5 e^{−} → 1/2 Cl_{2}(g) + 3 H_{2}O	1.47	ClO^{−}_{3} + 3 H_{2}O + 6 e^{−} → Cl^{−} + 6 OH^{−}	0.63
Perchlorate	8 H^{+} + ClO^{−}_{4} + 7 e^{−} → 1/2 Cl_{2}(g) + 4 H_{2}O	1.42	ClO^{−}_{4} + 4 H_{2}O + 8 e^{−} → Cl^{−} + 8 OH^{−}	0.56

== Uses ==
The most important chlorite is sodium chlorite (NaClO_{2}), used in the bleaching of textiles, pulp, and paper. However, despite its strongly oxidizing nature, it is often not used directly, being instead used to generate the neutral species chlorine dioxide (ClO_{2}), normally via a reaction with HCl:

5 NaClO_{2} + 4 HCl → 5 NaCl + 4 ClO_{2} + 2 H_{2}O

== Health risks ==
In 2009, the California Office of Environmental Health Hazard Assessment, or OEHHA, released a public health goal of maintaining amounts lower than 50 parts per billion for chlorite in drinking water. Some studies have indicated that at certain levels chlorite may also be carcinogenic.

The federal legal limit in the United States allows chlorite up to levels of 1,000 parts per billion in drinking water, 20 times as much chlorite as California’s public health goal.

== Other oxyanions ==
Several oxyanions of chlorine exist, in which it can assume oxidation states of −1, +1, +3, +5, or +7 within the corresponding anions Cl^{−}, ClO^{−}, ClO^{−}_{2}, ClO^{−}_{3}, or ClO^{−}_{4}, known commonly and respectively as chloride, hypochlorite, chlorite, chlorate, and perchlorate. These are part of a greater family of other chlorine oxides.

oxidation state	−1	+1	+3	+5	+7
anion named	chloride	hypochlorite	chlorite	chlorate	perchlorate
formula	Cl^{−}	ClO^{−}	ClO^{−}_{2}	ClO^{−}_{3}	ClO^{−}_{4}
structure	The chloride ion	The hypochlorite ion	The chlorite ion	The chlorate ion	The perchlorate ion

== See also ==
- Tetrachlorodecaoxide, a chlorite-based drug
- Chloryl, ClO^{+}_{2}
