= Sodium chlorate =

- Skeletal formula of sodium chlorate

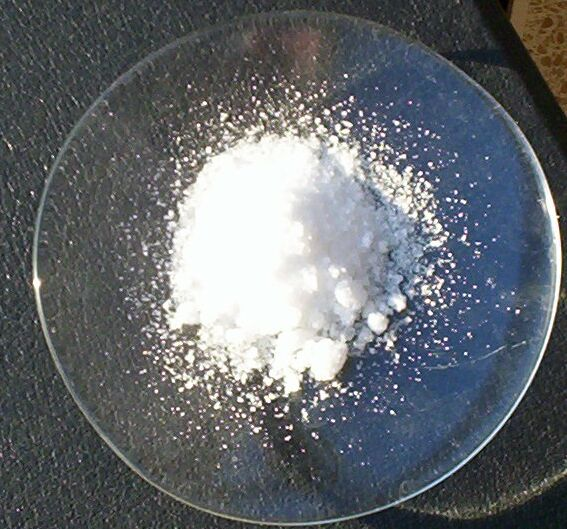
- Sodium chlorate powder

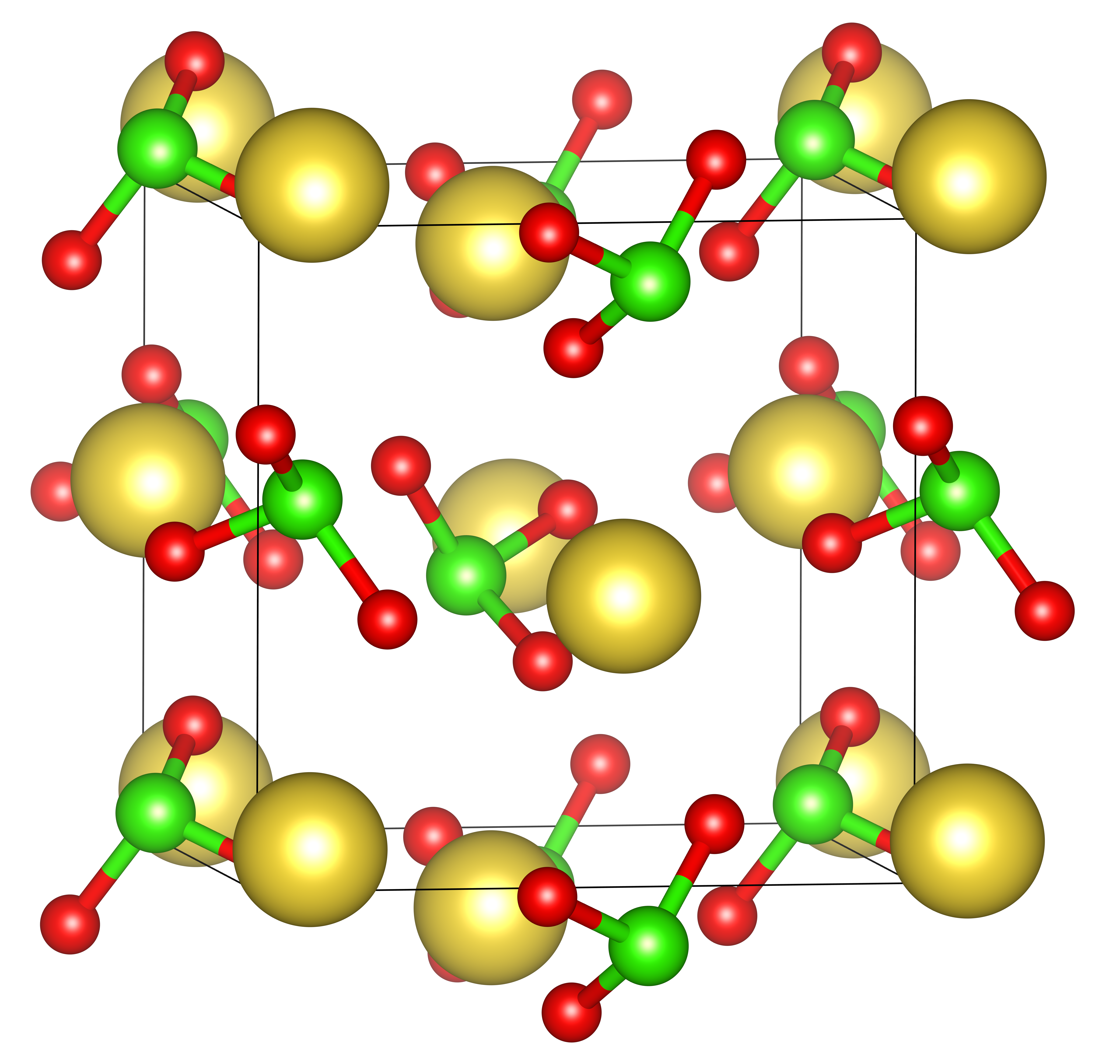
- Unit cell of sodium chlorate

Names
- IUPAC name Sodium chlorate
- Other names Sodium chlorate(V)

Identifiers
| CAS Number | 7775-09-9 |
| 3D model (JSmol) | Interactive image |
| ChEBI | CHEBI:65242 |
| ChemSpider | 22895 |
| ECHA InfoCard | 100.028.989 |
| EC Number | 231-887-4 |
| KEGG | C18765 |
| MeSH | Sodium+chlorate |
| PubChem CID | 516902 |
| RTECS number | FO0525000 |
| UNII | T95DR77GMR |
| UN number | 1495, 2428 |
| CompTox Dashboard (EPA) | DTXSID7026025 |
- InChI: InChI=1S/ClHO3.Na/c2-1(3)4;/h(H,2,3,4);/q;+1/p-1 Key: YZHUMGUJCQRKBT-UHFFFAOYSA-M; InChI=1S/ClHO3.Na/c2-1(3)4;/h(H,2,3,4);/q;+1/p-1 Key: YZHUMGUJCQRKBT-UHFFFAOYSA-M; InChI=1/ClHO3.Na/c2-1(3)4;/h(H,2,3,4);/q;+1/p-1 Key: YZHUMGUJCQRKBT-REWHXWOFAH
- SMILES: [Na+].[O-]Cl(=O)=O

Properties
| Chemical formula | NaClO_{3} |
| Molar mass | 106.44 g mol^{−1} |
| Appearance | Colorless or white solid, hygroscopic |
| Odor | Odorless |
| Density | 2.49 g/cm^{3} (15 °C); 2.54 g/cm^{3} (20.2 °C) |
| Melting point | 248–261 °C (478–502 °F; 521–534 K) |
| Boiling point | 300–400 °C (572–752 °F; 573–673 K) decomposes |
| Solubility in water | 79 g/100 mL (0 °C); 89 g/100 mL (10 °C); 105.7 g/100 mL (25 °C); 125 g/100 mL (40 °C); 220.4 g/100 mL (100 °C) |
| Solubility | Soluble in glycerol, hydrazine, methanol Slightly soluble in ethanol, ammonia |
| Solubility in acetone | Sparingly soluble |
| Solubility in glycerol | 20 g/100 g (15.5 °C) |
| Solubility in ethanol | 14.7 g/100 g |
| Vapor pressure | <0.35 mPa |
| Magnetic susceptibility (χ) | −34.7·10^{−6} cm^{3}/mol |
| Refractive index (n_{D}) | 1.515 (20 °C) |

Structure
| Crystal structure | cubic |
| Point group | P2_{1}3 |
| Lattice constant | a = 6.57584 Å |
| Formula units (Z) | 4 |

Thermochemistry
| Heat capacity (C) | 104.6 J/mol·K |
| Std molar entropy (S^{⦵}_{298}) | 129.7 J/mol·K |
| Std enthalpy of formation (Δ_{f}H^{⦵}_{298}) | −365.4 kJ/mol |
| Gibbs free energy (Δ_{f}G^{⦵}) | −275 kJ/mol |

Hazards
- GHS labelling
| Pictograms | (GHS03: Oxidizing) (GHS07: Exclamation mark) (GHS09: Environmental hazard) |
| Signal word | Danger |
| Hazard statements | H271, H302, H411 |
| Precautionary statements | P220, P273 |
| NFPA 704 (fire diamond) | 2 0 3 OX |
| Flash point | Non-flammable |
- Lethal dose or concentration (LD, LC)
| LD_{50} (median dose) | 600 mg/kg (rats, oral); 700 mg/kg (dogs, oral) |
| Safety data sheet (SDS) | ICSC 1117 |

Related compounds
| Other anions | Sodium chloride Sodium hypochlorite Sodium chlorite Sodium perchlorate Sodium bromate Sodium iodate |
| Other cations | Ammonium chlorate Potassium chlorate Barium chlorate |
| Related compounds | Chloric acid |
- Except where otherwise noted, data are given for materials in their standard state (at 25 °C [77 °F], 100 kPa). verify (what is ?) Infobox references

Sodium chlorate is an inorganic compound with the chemical formula NaClO_{3}. It is a white crystalline powder that is readily soluble in water. It is hygroscopic. It decomposes above 300 °C to release oxygen and leaves sodium chloride. Several hundred million tons are produced annually, mainly for applications in bleaching pulp to produce high brightness paper.

== Synthesis ==
Industrially, sodium chlorate is produced by the electrolysis of concentrated sodium chloride solutions. All other processes are obsolete. The sodium chlorate process is not to be confused with the chloralkali process, which is an industrial process for the electrolytic production of sodium hydroxide and chlorine gas.

The overall reaction can be simplified to the equation:

NaCl + 3 H_{2}O → NaClO_{3} + 3 H_{2}

First, chloride is oxidised to form intermediate hypochlorite, ClO^{−}, which undergoes further oxidation to chlorate along two competing reaction paths: (1) Anodic chlorate formation at the boundary layer between the electrolyte and the anode, and (2) Autoxidation of hypochlorite in the bulk electrolyte.

Under electrolysis hydrogen and sodium hydroxide are formed at the cathode and chloride ions are discharged at the anode (mixed metal oxide electrode is often used). The evolved chlorine does not escape as a gas but undergoes hydrolysis:

Cl_{2} + H_{2}O ⇋ HClO + H^{+} + Cl^{−}

The hydrolysis of chlorine is considered to be fast. The formation of H^{+} ions should make the boundary layer at the anode strongly acidic and this is observed at low chloride concentrations. However, large concentrations of chloride, as they occur in industrial chlorate cells, shift the hydrolysis equilibrium to the left. At the boundary layer the concentration of H^{+} is not high enough to permit diffusion into the bulk electrolyte. Therefore hydrogen is transported away from the anode mostly as hypochlorous acid rather than H^{+}. The hypochlorous acid dissociates in the bulk electrolyte where the pH is high and the hypochlorite ion diffuses back to the anode. More than two thirds of the hypochlorite is consumed by buffering before reaching the anode. The remainder is discharged at the anode to form chlorate and oxygen:

12 ClO^{−} + 6 H_{2}O → 4 ClO_{3}^{−} + 12 H^{+} + 8 Cl^{−} + 3 O_{2}

The autoxidation of hypochlorous acid in the bulk electrolyte proceeds according to the simplified overall equation:

3 HClO → ClO_{3}^{−} + 2 Cl^{−} + 3 H^{+}

It is preceded by the dissociation of a part of the hypochlorous acid involved:

HClO → ClO^{−} + H^{+}

The reaction requires a certain distance from the anode to occur to a significant degree, where the electrolyte is sufficiently buffered by the hydroxyl formed at the cathode. The hypochlorite then reacts with the rest of the acid:

2 HClO + ClO^{−} → ClO_{3}^{−} + 2 Cl^{−} + 2 H^{+}

In addition to anode distance the autoxidation also depends on temperature and pH. A typical cell operates at temperatures between 80 °C and 90 °C and at a pH of 6.1–6.4.

Independent of the reaction route the discharge of 6 mol of chloride is required to yield 1 mol of chlorate. However, the anodic oxidation route requires 50% additional electric energy. Therefore, industrial cells are optimised to favour autoxidation. Chlorate formation at the anode is treated as a loss reaction and is minimised by design.

Other loss reactions also decrease the current efficiency and must be suppressed in industrial systems. The main loss occurs by the back reduction of hypochlorite at the cathode. The reaction is suppressed by the addition of a small amount of dichromate (1–5 g/L) to the electrolyte. A porous film of chromium hydroxide is formed by cathodic deposition. The film impedes the diffusion of anions to the cathode, whereas the access of cations and their reduction is facilitated. The film stops growing on its own after it reaches a certain thickness.

== Uses ==
The main commercial use for sodium chlorate is for making chlorine dioxide (ClO_{2}). The largest application of ClO_{2}, which accounts for about 95% of the use of chlorate, is in bleaching of pulp. All other, less important chlorates are derived from sodium chlorate, usually by salt metathesis with the corresponding chloride. All perchlorate compounds are produced industrially by the oxidation of solutions of sodium chlorate by electrolysis.

=== Herbicides ===
Sodium chlorate is used as a non-selective herbicide. It is considered phytotoxic to all green plant parts. It can also kill through root absorption.

Sodium chlorate may be used to control a variety of plants including morning glory, canada thistle, johnson grass, bamboo, ragwort, and St John's wort. The herbicide is mainly used on non-crop land for spot treatment and for total vegetation control on areas including roadsides, fenceways, and ditches. Sodium chlorate is also used as a defoliant and desiccant for:

- maize
- Cotton
- Dry beans
- Flax
- Grain sorghum
- Peppers
- Rice
- Safflower
- Southern peas
- Soybeans
- Sunflowers

If used in combination with atrazine, it increases the persistence of the effect. If used in combination with 2,4-D, performance is improved. Sodium chlorate has a soil sterilant effect. Mixing with other herbicides in aqueous solution is possible to some extent, so long as they are not susceptible to oxidation.

The sale of sodium chlorate as a weedkiller was banned in the European Union in 2009 citing health dangers, with existing stocks to be used within the following year.

=== Chemical oxygen generation ===
Chemical oxygen generators, such as those in commercial aircraft, provide emergency oxygen to passengers to protect them from drops in cabin pressure. Oxygen is generated by high-temperature decomposition of sodium chlorate:

2 NaClO_{3} → 2 NaCl + 3 O_{2}

Heat required to initiate this reaction is generated by oxidation of a small amount of iron powder mixed with the sodium chlorate, and the reaction consumes less oxygen than is produced. Barium peroxide (BaO_{2}) is used to absorb the chlorine that is a minor product in the decomposition. An ignitor charge is activated by pulling on the emergency mask. Similarly, the Solidox welding system used pellets of sodium chlorate mixed with combustible fibers to generate oxygen.

=== Oxygenless combustion ===
Sodium chlorate can be mixed with sucrose sugar to make a highly energetic fuel, similar to that of gunpowder, that burns in airtight spaces. This is the reaction:

8 NaClO_{3} + C_{12}H_{22}O_{11} → 8 NaCl + 12 CO_{2} + 11 H_{2}O

However this sodium chlorate is mostly replaced by potassium chlorate.

=== Organic synthesis ===
Sodium chlorate can be used with hydrochloric acid (or also sulphuric acid and sodium chloride, the reaction of which generates HCl) to chlorinate aromatic compounds without the use of organic solvents. In this case its function is to oxidize the HCl to obtain either HOCl or Cl_{2} (depending upon the pH) in-situ which are the active chlorinating agents.

When combined with a vanadium pentoxide catalyst, it serves as an oxidant for a variety of organic compounds. Examples include the oxidation of hydroquinone to quinone, and of furfural to a mixture of maleic and fumaric acid.

== Toxicity in humans ==
Sodium chlorate is toxic: "doses of a few grams of chlorate are lethal". (ld50 oral in rats 1200mg/kg) The oxidative effect on hemoglobin leads to methaemoglobin formation, which is followed by denaturation of the globin protein and a cross-linking of erythrocyte membrane proteins with resultant damage to the membrane enzymes. This leads to increased permeability of the membrane, and severe hemolysis. The denaturation of hemoglobin overwhelms the capacity of the G6PD metabolic pathway. In addition, this enzyme is directly denatured by chlorate.

Acute severe hemolysis results, with multi-organ failure, including DIC and kidney failure. In addition there is a direct toxicity to the proximal renal tubule. The treatment will consist of exchange transfusion, peritoneal dialysis or hemodialysis.

== Formulations ==
Sodium chlorate is available in dust, spray and granule formulations. Mixtures of chlorates and organic compounds pose a severe risk of explosions

Marketed formulations contain a fire retardant. Most commercially available chlorate weedkillers contain approximately 53% sodium chlorate with the balance being a fire depressant such as sodium metaborate or ammonium phosphates.

== Trade names ==
Sodium chlorate is the active ingredient in a variety of commercial herbicides. Some trade names for products containing sodium chlorate include Atlacide, Defol, De-Fol-Ate, Drop-Leaf, Fall, Harvest-Aid, Kusatol, Leafex, and Tumbleaf. The compound may be used in combination with other herbicides such as atrazine, 2,4-D, bromacil, diuron, and sodium metaborate.

Sodium chlorate was an extensively used weed killer within the EU, until 2009 when it was withdrawn after a decision made under terms of EU Regulations. Its use as a herbicide outside the EU remains unaffected, as does its use in other non-herbicidal applications, such as in the production of chlorine dioxide biocides and for pulp and paper bleaching.

== Cultural references ==
Historian James Watson of Massey University in New Zealand wrote a widely reported article, "The Significance of Mr. Richard Buckley's Exploding Trousers" about accidents with sodium chlorate when used as a herbicide to control ragwort in the 1930s. This later won him an Ig Nobel Prize in 2005, and was the basis for the May 2006 "Exploding Pants" episode of MythBusters.

== See also ==
- Sodium chlorite (NaClO2)
- Sodium chloride (NaCl)
