= Potassium chlorate =

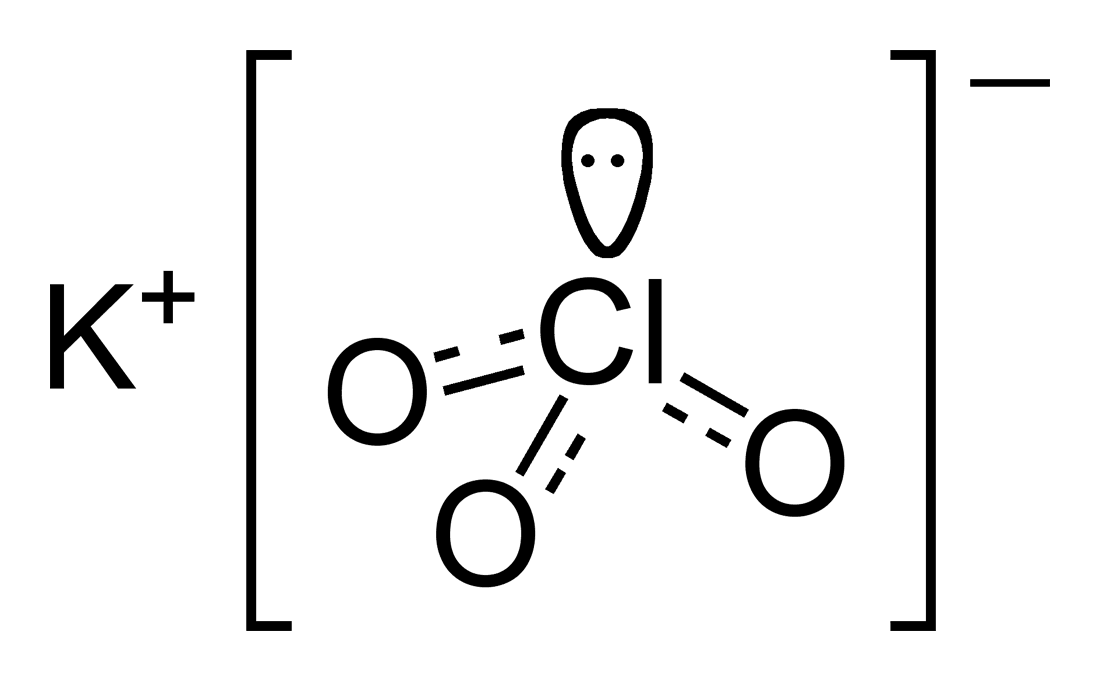
- The structure of the ions in potassium chlorate

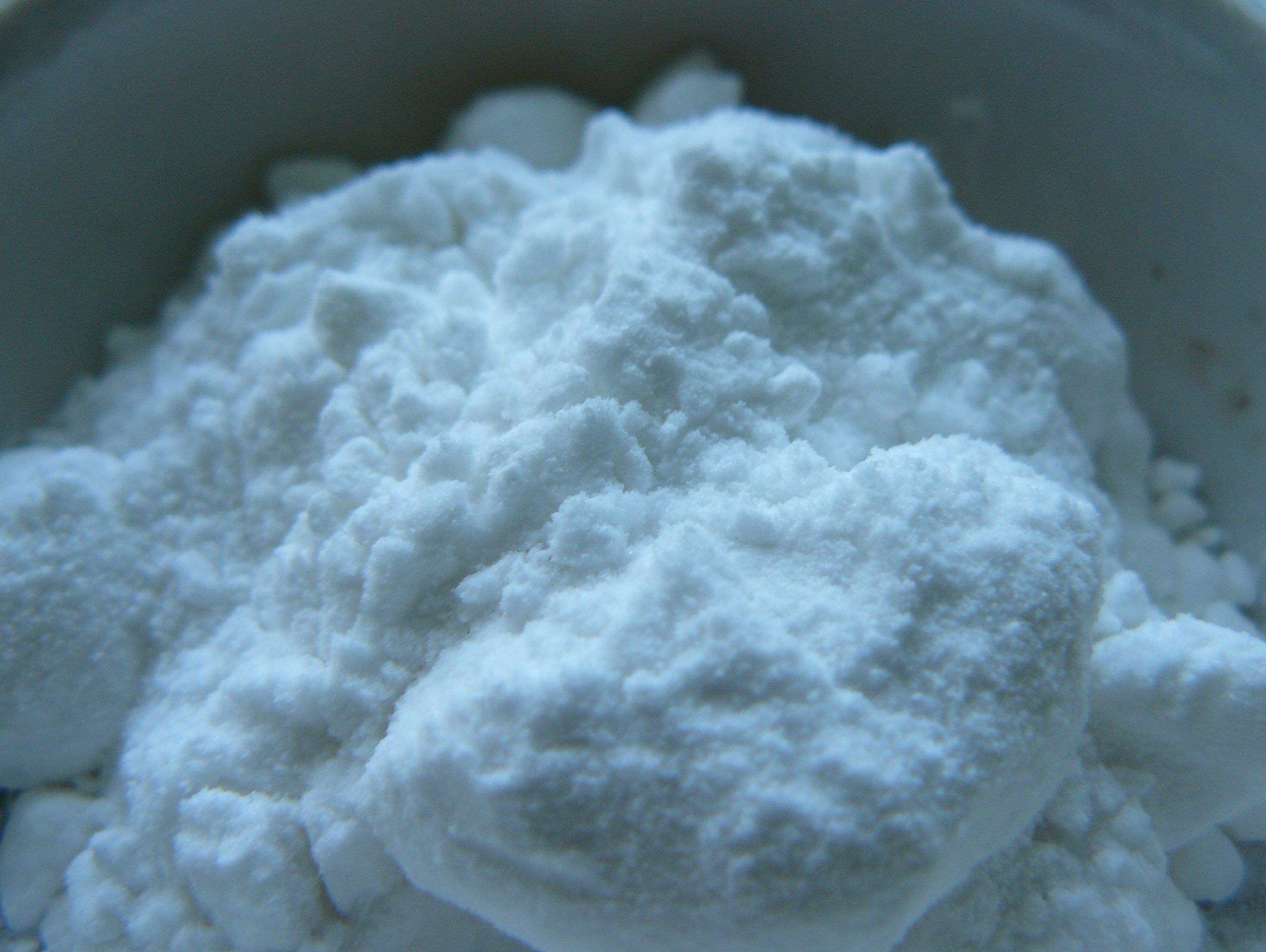
- Potassium chlorate crystals

Names
- Other names: Potassium chlorate(V); Potcrate; Berthollet salt

Identifiers
CAS Number	3811-04-9
3D model (JSmol)	Interactive image
ChEMBL	ChEMBL3188561
ChemSpider	18512
ECHA InfoCard	100.021.173
EC Number	223-289-7
PubChem CID	6426889
RTECS number	FO0350000
UNII	H35KS68EE7
UN number	1485
CompTox Dashboard (EPA)	DTXSID6047448
- InChI: InChI=1S/ClHO3.K/c2-1(3)4;/h(H,2,3,4);/q;+1/p-1 Key: VKJKEPKFPUWCAS-UHFFFAOYSA-M; InChI=1/ClHO3.K/c2-1(3)4;/h(H,2,3,4);/q;+1/p-1 Key: VKJKEPKFPUWCAS-REWHXWOFAC
- SMILES: [K+].[O-]Cl(=O)=O

Properties
Chemical formula	KClO_{3}
Molar mass	122.55 g·mol^{−1}
Appearance	white crystals or powder
Density	2.32 g/cm^{3}
Melting point	356 °C (673 °F; 629 K)
Boiling point	400 °C (752 °F; 673 K) decomposes
Solubility in water	3.14 g/100g (0 °C (32 °F; 273 K)); 4.45 g/100g (10 °C (50 °F; 283 K)); 8.17 g/100g (25 °C (77 °F; 298 K)); 13.31 g/100g (40 °C (104 °F; 313 K)); 55.54 g/100g (100 °C (212 °F; 373 K)); 183.0 g/100g (190 °C (374 °F; 463 K)); 2930 g/100g (330 °C (626 °F; 603 K))
Solubility	negligible in acetone and liquid ammonia
Solubility in glycerol	1 g/100g (20 °C (68 °F; 293 K))
Magnetic susceptibility (χ)	−43.8×10^{−6} cm^{3}/mol
Refractive index (n_{D})	1.40835

Structure
Crystal structure	monoclinic

Thermochemistry
Heat capacity (C)	−391.2 J/(mol·K)
Std molar entropy (S^{⦵}_{298})	142.97 J/(mol·K)
Std enthalpy of formation (Δ_{f}H^{⦵}_{298})	−391.2 kJ/mol
Gibbs free energy (Δ_{f}G^{⦵})	−289.9 kJ/mol

Hazards
- GHS labelling
Pictograms	(GHS03: Oxidizing) (GHS06: Toxic)
Signal word	Danger
Hazard statements	H271, H301, H401
Precautionary statements	P210, P220, P221, P264, P270, P273, P280, P283, P301+P310+P330, P306+P360, P370+P378, P371+P380+P375, P405, P501
NFPA 704 (fire diamond)	3 0 3 OX
- Lethal dose or concentration (LD, LC)
LD_{50} (median dose)	100 mg/kg (oral, rat)
LC_{50} (median concentration)	>5.1 mg/L

Related compounds
Other anions	Potassium bromate; Potassium chloride; Potassium chlorite; Potassium hypochlorite; Potassium iodate; Potassium nitrate; Potassium perchlorate
Other cations	Ammonium chlorate; Sodium chlorate; Barium chlorate
- Except where otherwise noted, data are given for materials in their standard state (at 25 °C [77 °F], 100 kPa). verify (what is ?) Infobox references

Potassium chlorate is the inorganic compound with the molecular formula KClO_{3}. In its pure form, it is a white solid. After sodium chlorate, it is the second most common chlorate in industrial use. It is a strong oxidizing agent and its most important application is in safety matches.

== Production ==
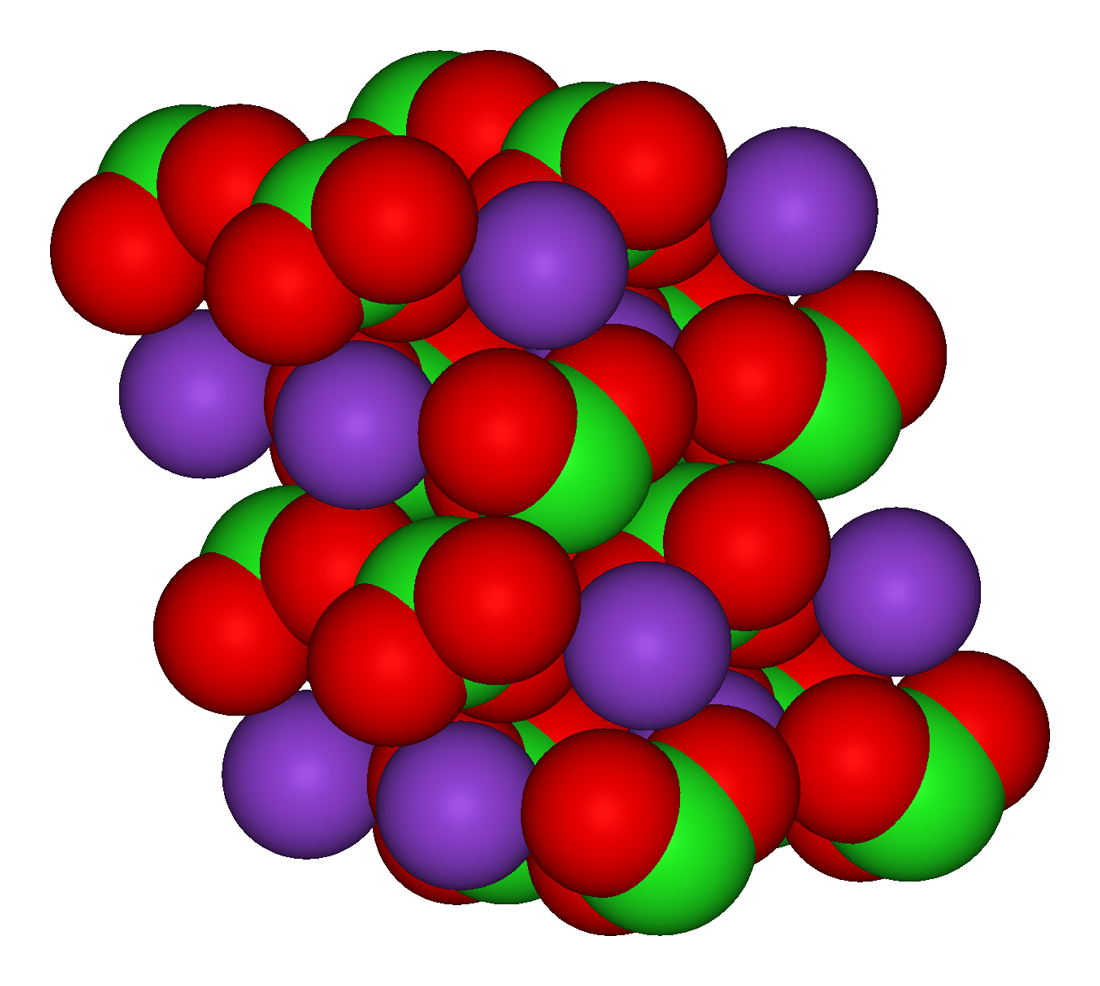
The crystal structure of potassium chlorate. Color code: red = O, violet = K, green = Cl

On the industrial scale, potassium chlorate is produced by the salt metathesis reaction of sodium chlorate and potassium chloride:

NaClO_{3} + KCl → NaCl + KClO_{3}

The reaction is driven by the low solubility of potassium chlorate in water. The equilibrium of the reaction is shifted to the right hand side by the continuous precipitation of the product (Le Chatelier's Principle). The precursor sodium chlorate is produced industrially in very large quantities by electrolysis of sodium chloride, common table salt.

The direct electrolysis of KCl in aqueous solution is also used sometimes, in which elemental chlorine formed at the anode reacts with KOH in situ. The low solubility of KClO_{3} in water causes the salt to conveniently isolate itself from the reaction mixture by simply precipitating out of solution.

Potassium chlorate can be produced in small amounts by disproportionation in a sodium hypochlorite solution followed by metathesis reaction with potassium chloride:

3 NaOCl → 2 NaCl + NaClO_{3}
KCl + NaClO_{3} → NaCl + KClO_{3}

It can also be produced by passing chlorine gas into a hot solution of potassium hydroxide:

3 Cl_{2} + 6 KOH → KClO_{3} + 5 KCl + 3 H_{2}O

== Uses ==
Potassium chlorate burning sugar

Potassium chlorate was one key ingredient in early firearms percussion caps (primers).

Another application of potassium chlorate is as the oxidizer in smoke compositions such as those used in smoke grenades.

=== Laboratory uses and demonstrations ===
Potassium chlorate readily decomposes if heated while in contact with a catalyst, typically manganese(IV) dioxide (MnO_{2}). Thus, it may be simply placed in a test tube and heated over a burner. If the test tube is equipped with a one-holed stopper and hose, warm oxygen can be drawn off. The reaction is as follows:

2 KClO_{3}(s) + MnO_{2}(cat) → 3 O_{2}(g) + 2 KCl(s)

Heating it in the absence of a catalyst converts it into potassium perchlorate:

4 KClO_{3} → 3 KClO_{4} + KCl

With further heating, potassium perchlorate decomposes to potassium chloride and oxygen:

KClO_{4} → KCl + 2 O_{2}

Candy being dropped into molten salt

The safe performance of this reaction requires very pure reagents and careful temperature control. Molten potassium chlorate is an extremely powerful oxidizer and spontaneously reacts with many common materials such as sugar, as shown in the common school lab demonstration of screaming jelly babies. Explosions have resulted from liquid chlorates spattering into the latex or PVC tubes of oxygen generators and from contact between chlorates and hydrocarbon sealing greases. Impurities in potassium chlorate itself can also cause problems.

Potassium chlorate reacts with sulfuric acid to form highly reactive chlorine dioxide, potassium sulfate, oxygen, and water:

4 KClO_{3} + 2 H_{2}SO_{4} → 2 K_{2}SO_{4} + 4 ClO_{2} (g) + O_{2} (g) + 2 H_{2}O

Chlorine dioxide, combined with oxygen gas (and any remaining potassium chlorate) is sufficiently reactive that it spontaneously ignites if combustible material (sugar, paper, etc.) is present.

=== Agriculture ===
Potassium chlorate is used also as a pesticide. In Finland it was sold under trade name Fegabit.

Potassium chlorate is used to force the blossoming stage of the longan tree, causing it to produce fruit in warmer climates.

=== Illicit use ===
Militant groups in Afghanistan also use potassium chlorate extensively as a key component in the production of improvised explosive devices (IEDs). When significant effort was made to reduce the availability of ammonium nitrate fertilizer in Afghanistan, IED makers started using potassium chlorate as a cheap and effective alternative. In 2013, 60% of IEDs in Afghanistan used potassium chlorate, making it the most common ingredient used in IEDs. Potassium chlorate was also the main ingredient in the car bomb used in the 2002 Bali bombings that killed 202 people.

== Safety ==
Potassium chlorate is a very powerful oxidizer. It reacts vigorously, and in some cases spontaneously ignites or explodes, when mixed with many combustible materials. It burns vigorously in combination with virtually any combustible material, even those normally only slightly flammable (including ordinary dust and lint). Mixtures of potassium chlorate and a fuel can ignite on contact with sulfuric acid. Mixtures of potassium chlorate with lactose, sulfur, sulfides such as antimony(III) sulfide, or phosphorus are extremely shock and friction sensitive.

== See also ==
- Chloric acid
