= Chlorate =

Anion and term for chemical compounds containing it

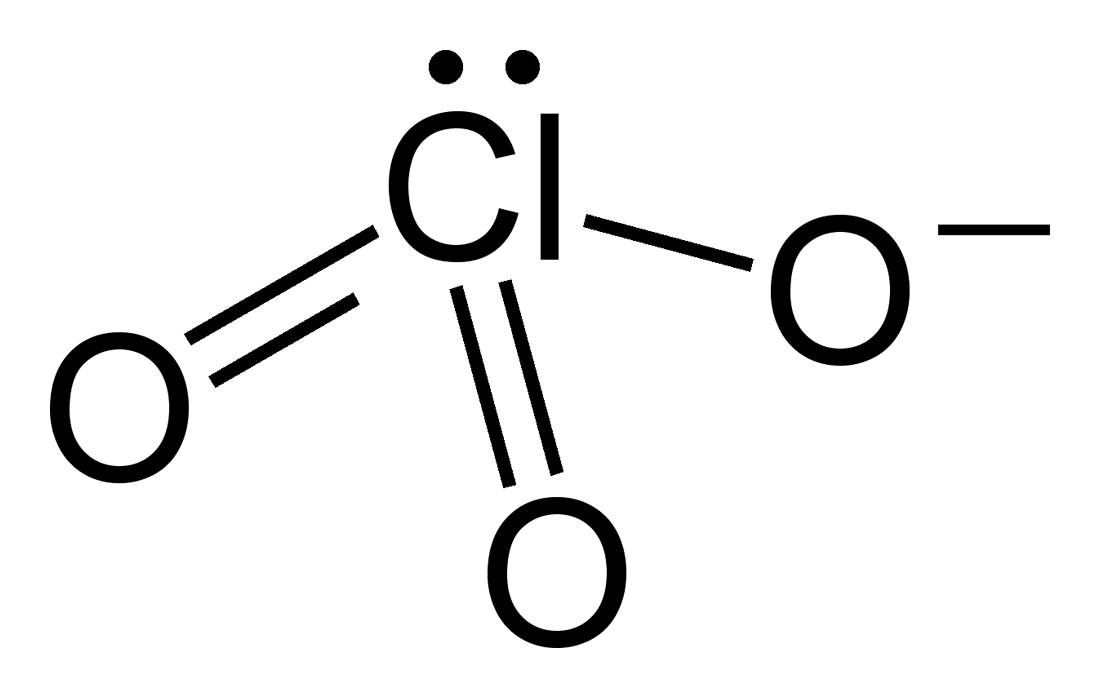
- Structure and bonding in the chlorate ion

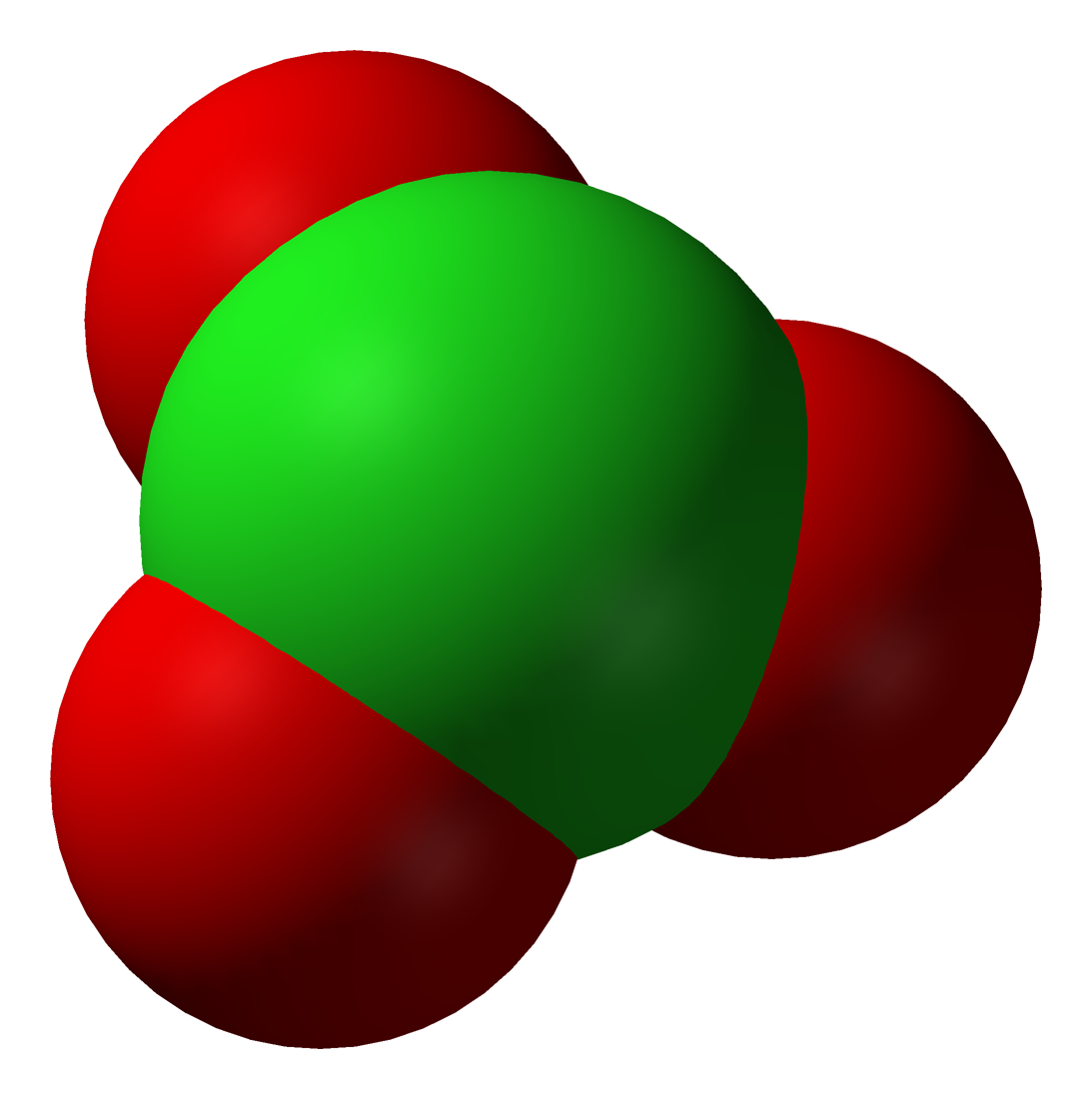
- The chlorate ion

Names
- Other names Chlorate(V)

Identifiers
CAS Number	14866-68-3
3D model (JSmol)	Interactive image
ChEBI	CHEBI:49709 ion; CHEBI:23109 class of salts
ChemSpider	94578
Gmelin Reference	1491
PubChem CID	104770
UNII	08Z8093742
UN number	1461
CompTox Dashboard (EPA)	DTXSID3073137
- InChI: InChI=1S/ClHO3/c2-1(3)4/h(H,2,3,4)/p-1 Key: XTEGARKTQYYJKE-UHFFFAOYSA-M
- SMILES: O=Cl(=O)[O-]

Properties
Chemical formula	ClO^{−}_{3}
Molar mass	83.4512

Structure
Molecular shape	Trigonal pyramidal

Hazards
- Occupational safety and health (OHS/OSH)
Main hazards	oxidation agent

Related compounds
Other anions	bromate; iodate
Related compounds	chloride; hypochlorite; chlorite; perchlorate
- Except where otherwise noted, data are given for materials in their standard state (at 25 °C [77 °F], 100 kPa). Infobox references

Chlorate is the common name of the ClO^{−}_{3} anion, whose chlorine atom is in the +5 oxidation state. The term can also refer to chemical compounds containing this anion, with chlorates being the salts of chloric acid. Other oxyanions of chlorine can be named "chlorate" followed by a Roman numeral in parentheses denoting the oxidation state of chlorine: e.g., the ClO^{−}_{4} ion commonly called perchlorate can also be called chlorate(VII).

As predicted by valence shell electron pair repulsion theory, chlorate anions have trigonal pyramidal structures.

Chlorates are powerful oxidizers and should be kept away from organics or easily oxidized materials. Mixtures of chlorate salts with virtually any combustible material (sugar, sawdust, charcoal, organic solvents, metals, etc.) will readily deflagrate. Chlorates were once widely used in pyrotechnics for this reason, though their use has fallen due to their instability. Most pyrotechnic applications that formerly used chlorates now use the more-stable perchlorates instead.

== Structure and bonding ==
The chlorate ion cannot be satisfactorily represented by just one Lewis structure, since all the Cl–O bonds are the same length (1.49 Å in potassium chlorate), and the chlorine atom is hypervalent. Instead, it is often thought of as a hybrid of multiple resonance structures:

== Preparation ==
=== Laboratory ===
Metal chlorates can be prepared by adding chlorine to hot metal hydroxides like KOH:

3 Cl_{2} + 6 KOH → 5 KCl + KClO_{3} + 3 H_{2}O

In this reaction, chlorine undergoes disproportionation, both reduction and oxidation. Chlorine, oxidation number 0, forms chloride (Cl^{−}; oxidation number −1) and chlorate(V) (ClO^{−}_{3}; oxidation number +5). The reaction of cold aqueous metal hydroxides with chlorine produces the chloride and hypochlorite (oxidation number +1) instead.

=== Industrial ===
The industrial-scale synthesis for sodium chlorate starts from an aqueous sodium chloride solution (brine) rather than chlorine gas. If the electrolysis equipment allows for the mixing of the chlorine and the sodium hydroxide, then the disproportionation reaction described above occurs. The heating of the reactants to 50–70 °C is performed by the electrical power used for electrolysis.

== Natural occurrence ==
A 2010 study has discovered the presence of natural chlorate deposits around the world, with relatively high concentrations found in arid and hyper-arid regions. The chlorate was also measured in rainfall samples with the amount of chlorate similar to perchlorate. It is suspected that chlorate and perchlorate may share a common natural formation mechanism and could be a part of the chlorine biogeochemistry cycle. From a microbial standpoint, the presence of natural chlorate could also explain why there is a variety of microorganisms capable of reducing chlorate to chloride. Further, the evolution of chlorate reduction may be an ancient phenomenon as all perchlorate reducing bacteria described to date also utilize chlorate as a terminal electron acceptor. It should be clearly stated, that currently no chlorate-dominant minerals are known. This means that the chlorate anion exists only as a substitution in the known mineral species, or – eventually – is present in the pore-filling solutions.

In 2011, a study by the Georgia Institute of Technology unveiled the presence of magnesium chlorate on the planet Mars.

== Compounds (salts) ==
Examples of chlorates include

- potassium chlorate, KClO_{3}
- sodium chlorate, NaClO_{3}
- magnesium chlorate, Mg(ClO_{3})_{2}

== Toxicity ==
Chlorates are relatively toxic, though they form generally harmless chlorides on reduction.

== Other oxyanions ==
If a Roman numeral in brackets follows the word "chlorate", this indicates that the oxyanion contains chlorine in the indicated oxidation state, namely:

Common name	Stock name	Oxidation state	Formula
hypochlorite	chlorate(I)	+1	ClO^{−}
chlorite	chlorate(III)	+3	ClO^{−}_{2}
chlorate	chlorate(V)	+5	ClO^{−}_{3}
perchlorate	chlorate(VII)	+7	ClO^{−}_{4}

Using this convention, "chlorate" means any chlorine oxyanion. Usually, "chlorate" refers only to chlorine in the +5 oxidation state.
