= Barium chlorate =

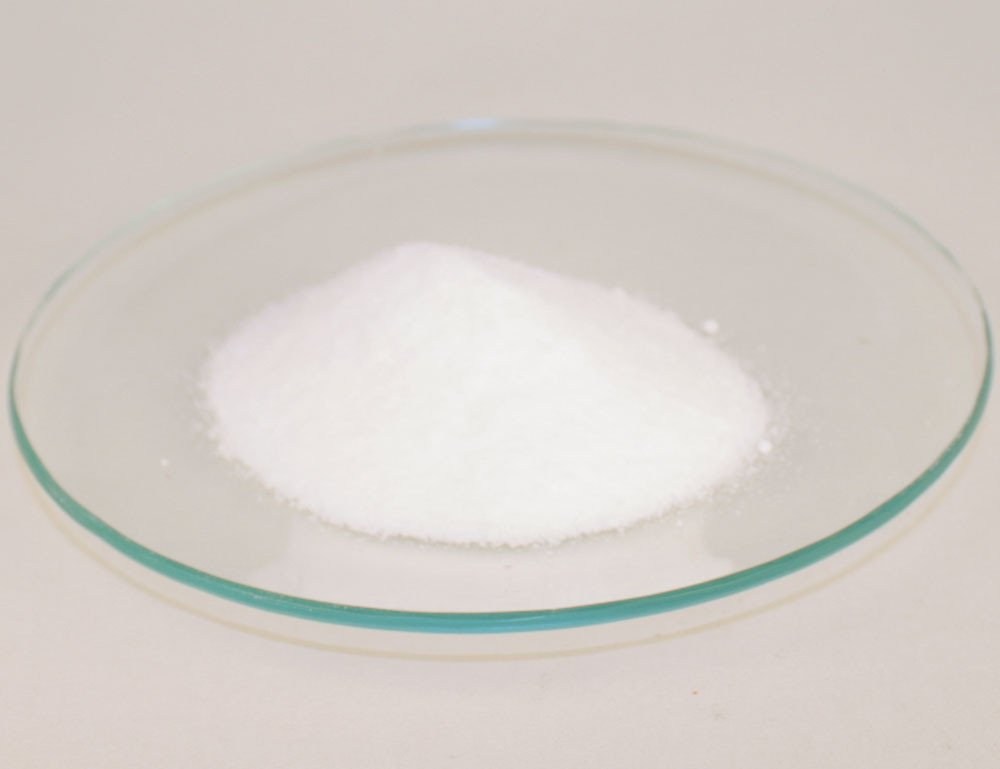

Names
- IUPAC name Barium dichlorate
- Other names Chloric acid, barium salt

Identifiers
CAS Number	13477-00-4
3D model (JSmol)	Interactive image
ChemSpider	24273
ECHA InfoCard	100.033.404
EC Number	236-760-7
PubChem CID	26059
RTECS number	FN9770000
UNII	GRW9DUG818
UN number	1445
CompTox Dashboard (EPA)	DTXSID60890702
- InChI: InChI=1S/Ba.2ClHO3/c;2*2-1(3)4/h;2*(H,2,3,4)/q+2;;/p-2 Key: ISFLYIRWQDJPDR-UHFFFAOYSA-L; InChI=1/Ba.2ClHO3/c;2*2-1(3)4/h;2*(H,2,3,4)/q+2;;/p-2 Key: ISFLYIRWQDJPDR-NUQVWONBAT
- SMILES: [Ba+2].[O-]Cl(=O)=O.[O-]Cl(=O)=O

Properties
Chemical formula	Ba(ClO_{3})_{2} (anhydrous); Ba(ClO_{3})_{2}·H_{2}O (monohydrate)
Molar mass	304.22 g⋅mol^{−1} (anhydrous); 322.24 g⋅mol^{−1} (monohydrate)
Appearance	white solid
Density	3.18 g/cm^{3} (monohydrate)
Melting point	120 °C (248 °F; 393 K) (monohydrate, decomposes to anhydrous); 413.9 °C (777.0 °F; 687.0 K) (anhydrous, decomposes)
Solubility in water	20.3 g/100g (0 °C (32 °F; 273 K)); 33.8 g/100g (20 °C (68 °F; 293 K)); 84.8 g/100g (80 °C (176 °F; 353 K)); 105 g/100g (100 °C (212 °F; 373 K))
Magnetic susceptibility (χ)	−87.5×10^{−6} cm^{3}/mol

Hazards
- GHS labelling
Pictograms	(GHS03: Oxidizing) (GHS07: Exclamation mark) (GHS09: Environmental hazard)
Signal word	Danger
Hazard statements	H271, H302, H332, H411
Precautionary statements	P210, P220, P221, P261, P264, P270, P271, P273, P280, P283, P301+P312, P304+P312, P304+P340, P306+P360, P312, P330, P370+P378, P371+P380+P375, P391, P501
NFPA 704 (fire diamond)	3 0 0 OX
Threshold limit value (TLV)	0.5 mg/m^{3} (TWA)
- Lethal dose or concentration (LD, LC)
LD_{50} (median dose)	500.1 mg/kg
LC_{50} (median concentration)	1.5 mg/L (4h, dust/mist)
- NIOSH (US health exposure limits)
PEL (Permissible)	0.5 mg/m^{3} (Vacated)
IDLH (Immediate danger)	50 mg/m^{3}
Safety data sheet (SDS)	Fisher Scientific
- Except where otherwise noted, data are given for materials in their standard state (at 25 °C [77 °F], 100 kPa). verify (what is ?) Infobox references

Barium chlorate, Ba(ClO_{3})_{2}, is the barium salt of chloric acid. It commonly exists as the monohydrate, Ba(ClO_{3})_{2}·H_{2}O. It is a white crystalline solid, and like all soluble barium compounds, toxic. It is sometimes used in pyrotechnics to produce a green colour. It also finds use in the production of chloric acid.

== Reactions ==
=== Synthesis ===
Barium chlorate can be produced through a double replacement reaction between solutions of barium chloride and sodium chlorate:

BaCl_{2} + 2 NaClO_{3} → Ba(ClO_{3})_{2} + 2 NaCl

After concentrating and cooling the resulting mixture, barium chlorate precipitates. This is perhaps the most common preparation, exploiting the lower solubility of barium chlorate compared to sodium chlorate.

The above method does result in some sodium contamination, which is undesirable for pyrotechnic purposes, where the strong yellow colour of sodium can easily overpower the green of barium. Sodium-free barium chlorate can be produced directly through electrolysis:

BaCl_{2} + 6 H_{2}O → Ba(ClO_{3})_{2} + 6 H_{2}

It can also be produced by the reaction of barium carbonate with boiling ammonium chlorate solution:

2 NH_{4}ClO_{3} + BaCO_{3} → Ba(ClO_{3})_{2} + 2 NH_{3} + H_{2}O + CO_{2}

The reaction initially produces barium chlorate and ammonium carbonate; boiling the solution decomposes the ammonium carbonate and drives off the resulting ammonia and carbon dioxide, leaving only barium chlorate in solution.

=== Decomposition ===
At the melting point, barium chlorate alone will decompose to barium chloride and oxygen:

Ba(ClO_{3})_{2} → BaCl_{2} + 3 O_{2}

== Commercial uses ==
=== Pyrotechnics ===
When barium chlorate is used as an oxidizer in a mixture with any fuel, it burns to produce a vibrant green light. It is one of the only oxidizers which can be used in a binary mixture to produce a high quality color; simple mixtures of Ba(ClO_{3})_{2} and shellac are sufficient to produce a high quality green. It was falling out of use by the mid 20th century, but when it was used more heavily in pyrotechnics, purely barium chlorate oxidized star formulas were reserved for higher quality exhibition devices due to the high cost and the high percentage of barium chlorate in said formulas.

Pure barium chlorate explodes from strong impact but is not easily detonable otherwise. There is at least one published report of self-ignition of wet stars drying in the sun. Because of the price and the decline in the use of chlorates in general, modern greens are more commonly produced with barium nitrate or barium carbonate and a chlorine donor or high-chlorine oxidizer.

=== Chloric acid ===
Barium chlorate is sometimes used to produce highly pure chloric acid, which can then be used for production of other pure chlorates.

== Toxicity ==
Barium chlorate is dangerous to human health, causing severe acute effects after high exposure. At lower levels, it is irritating to the skin, nasal passages, and throat, and can cause nausea, vomiting, diarrhea, and abdominal pain. At high levels it may cause methemoglobinemia, a condition where the blood can no longer carry sufficient oxygen. This results in a range of effects from dizziness and lightheadedness to trouble breathing, collapse, and death depending on exposure level. It may also cause tremors, seizures, muscle twitching, and irregular heartbeat.

As a soluble heavy metal salt it has the potential to cause heavy metal poisoning and effects such as kidney damage from long term low level exposures that do not produce immediate symptoms. It may also cause bright spots in the lungs in chest x-rays, a benign condition known as baritosis.

== Environmental Hazard ==
It is very harmful to aquatic organisms if it is leached into bodies of water. It may be necessary to dispose of this compound as hazardous waste, depending on local and or federal laws.
