= Silver hypoiodite =

Names
- IUPAC name Silver(I) hypoiodite
- Other names: Argentous hypoiodite; Iodoxysilver

Identifiers
3D model (JSmol)	Interactive image
- InChI: InChI=1S/Ag.IO/c;1-2/q+1;-1 Key: IVJMAQWBPZFGIB-UHFFFAOYSA-N
- SMILES: [Ag+].I[O-]

Properties
Chemical formula	AgIO
Molar mass	250.772 g·mol^{−1}

Related compounds
Other anions	Silver chloride; Silver chlorite; Silver chlorate; Silver perchlorate
Other cations	Sodium hypochlorite; Potassium hypochlorite; Calcium hypochlorite; Barium hypochlorite; Copper hypochlorite
Related compounds	Hypochlorous acid; Silver hypochlorite; Silver hypobromite; Methyl hypochlorite
- Except where otherwise noted, data are given for materials in their standard state (at 25 °C [77 °F], 100 kPa). Infobox references

Silver hypoiodite is a chemical compound with the chemical formula AgIO. This is an ionic compound of silver and the polyatomic ion hypoiodite. It decomposes rapidly at room temperature.

== Synthesis ==
Adding iodine to a dilute neutral solution of silver nitrate:

2 AgNO_{3} + I_{2} + H_{2}O → AgI + AgIO + 2 HNO_{3}
