= Promethium iodate =

Identifiers
CAS Number	anhydrous: 14325-83-8; monohydrate: 58890-24-7
3D model (JSmol)	anhydrous: Interactive image; monohydrate: Interactive image
- InChI: InChI=1S/3HIO3.Pm/c3*2-1(3)4;/h3*(H,2,3,4);/q;;;+3/p-3 Key: OTVRQOHWWGIUPQ-UHFFFAOYSA-K
- SMILES: anhydrous: [Pm+3].O=I(=O)[O-].O=I(=O)[O-].O=I(=O)[O-]; monohydrate: [Pm+3].O=I(=O)[O-].O=I(=O)[O-].O=I(=O)[O-].O

Properties
Chemical formula	Pm(IO_{3})_{3}
Molar mass	669.71
Density	5.00 g·cm^{−3} (hydrate)
- Except where otherwise noted, data are given for materials in their standard state (at 25 °C [77 °F], 100 kPa). Infobox references

Promethium iodate is an inorganic compound with the chemical formula Pm(IO_{3})_{3}. It can be obtained by reacting with potassium iodate, ammonium iodate or a slight excess of iodic acid and Pm^{3+} solution and precipitating it. Its hydrate, Pm(IO_{3})_{3}·H_{2}O, crystallizes in the P2_{1} space group, with unit cell parameters a=10.172±13, b=6.700±20, c=7.289±24 Å, β=113.1±0.2°.

== External reading ==
- Gumiński, Cezary (2015-05-01). "Solubility and the periodic table of elements". Pure and Applied Chemistry. 87 (5): 477–485. doi:10.1515/pac-2014-0935. ISSN 1365-3075.
- Pruitt, M. E.; Rickard, R. R.; Wyatt, E. I. (1962-02-01). "Radiochemical Determination of Yttrium and Promethium. A Precipitation Technique". Analytical Chemistry. 34 (2): 283–287. doi:10.1021/ac60182a042. ISSN 0003-2700.
