= Silver hypobromite =

Names
- IUPAC name Silver(I) hypobromite
- Other names Argentous hypobromite, bromooxysilver

Identifiers
| CAS Number | 475461-55-3 |
| 3D model (JSmol) | Interactive image |
| ChemSpider | 28294912 |
- InChI: InChI=1S/Ag.BrO/c;1-2/q+1;-1 Key: QAUJTFHKYYYRLJ-UHFFFAOYSA-N
- SMILES: [Ag+].[O-]Br

Properties
| Chemical formula | AgBrO |
| Molar mass | 203.771 g·mol^{−1} |
| Solubility in water | very soluble |

Related compounds
| Other anions | Silver chloride; Silver chlorite; Silver chlorate; Silver hypochlorite; Silver hypoiodite; Silver perchlorate |
| Other cations | Sodium hypobromite |
| Related compounds | Hypobromous acid |
- Except where otherwise noted, data are given for materials in their standard state (at 25 °C [77 °F], 100 kPa). Infobox references

Silver hypobromite is an inorganic compound with the chemical formula AgBrO. It is an ionic compound of silver and the polyatomic ion hypobromite. It decomposes very rapidly even at room temperature.

== Synthesis ==
Silver hypobromite can be prepared by the oxidation of silver sub-bromide:

4 Ag_{2}Br + 4 H_{2}O + 3 O_{2} → 4 AgOBr + 4 AgOH + 2 H_{2}O

It can also be prepared by the reaction of silver hydroxide and hypobromous acid:

AgOH + BrHO → AgBrO + H_{2}O
