= Ytterbium(III) iodate =

Identifiers
| CAS Number | 14723-98-9 anhydrous; 54261-46-0 dihydrate; 24859-45-8 tetrahydrate |
| 3D model (JSmol) | Interactive image |
| CompTox Dashboard (EPA) | DTXSID90163633 |
- InChI: InChI=1S/3HIO3.Yb/c3*2-1(3)4;/h3*(H,2,3,4);/q;;;+3/p-3 Key: LLMQNIXRCPRHGZ-UHFFFAOYSA-K
- SMILES: [Yb+3].O=I(=O)[O-].O=I(=O)[O-].O=I(=O)[O-]

Properties
| Chemical formula | Yb(IO_{3})_{3} |
| Molar mass | 697.75 |
| Appearance | colourless crystals (dihydrate) |
| Density | 5.067 g·cm^{−3} (dihydrate) |
- Except where otherwise noted, data are given for materials in their standard state (at 25 °C [77 °F], 100 kPa). Infobox references

Ytterbium(III) iodate is an inorganic compound with the chemical formula Yb(IO_{3})_{3}. Its dihydrate can be prepared by reacting ytterbium sulfate and iodic acid in water at 200 °C. It crystallizes in the P2_{1}/c space group, with unit cell parameters a=8.685, b=6.066, c=16.687 Å, β=115.01°.
