= Ytterbium(III) bromate =

Identifiers
CAS Number	anhydrous: 28972-23-8; nonahydrate: 17786-86-6
3D model (JSmol)	anhydrous: Interactive image; nonahydrate: Interactive image
EC Number	anhydrous: 249-344-5
PubChem CID	anhydrous: 44149691
CompTox Dashboard (EPA)	anhydrous: DTXSID50183175
- InChI: InChI=1S/3BrHO3.Yb/c3*2-1(3)4;/h3*(H,2,3,4);/q;;;+3/p-3 Key: AOIRCHZDHBOTFE-UHFFFAOYSA-K; nonahydrate: InChI=1S/3BrHO3.9H2O.Yb/c3*2-1(3)4;;;;;;;;;;/h3*(H,2,3,4);9*1H2;/q;;;;;;;;;;;;+3/p-3 Key: WUBFCEQYBPEONT-UHFFFAOYSA-K
- SMILES: anhydrous: [O-]Br(=O)=O.[O-]Br(=O)=O.[O-]Br(=O)=O.[Yb+3]; nonahydrate: [O-]Br(=O)=O.[O-]Br(=O)=O.[O-]Br(=O)=O.[Yb+3].O.O.O.O.O.O.O.O.O

Properties
Chemical formula	Br_{3}O_{9}Yb
Molar mass	556.748 g·mol^{−1}
Appearance	colourless needle crystals (nonahydrate)
- Except where otherwise noted, data are given for materials in their standard state (at 25 °C [77 °F], 100 kPa). Infobox references

Ytterbium(III) bromate is an inorganic compound with the chemical formula Yb(BrO_{3})_{3}. It can be produced by the reaction of ytterbium(III) sulfate and barium bromate. After filtering out the barium sulfate, the solution is concentrated to crystallize ytterbium(III) bromate nonahydrate. The nonahydrate is thermally decomposed via anhydrate to obtain ytterbium oxybromide.

== External reading ==
- Serebrennikov, V. V.; Batyreva, V. A.; Tsybakova, T. N. Neodymium bromate-ytterbium bromate-water and neodymium selenate-ytterbium selenate-water systems at 25°. Zhurnal Neorganicheskoi Khimii, 1981. 26 (10). 2837–2840. ISSN 0044-457X.
