= Silver iodate =

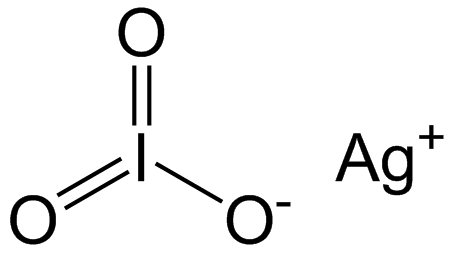
- Silver iodate

Names
- IUPAC name Silver(I) iodate
- Systematic IUPAC name Silver(I) iodate(V)
- Other names Argentous iodate

Identifiers
| CAS Number | 7783-97-3 |
| 3D model (JSmol) | Interactive image |
| ChemSpider | 145168 |
| ECHA InfoCard | 100.029.126 |
| EC Number | 232-039-6 |
| PubChem CID | 165642 |
| UNII | 5P7OX4VT1F |
| CompTox Dashboard (EPA) | DTXSID80894883 |
- InChI: InChI=1S/Ag.HIO3/c;2-1(3)4/h;(H,2,3,4)/q+1;/p-1 Key: YSVXTGDPTJIEIX-UHFFFAOYSA-M; InChI=1/Ag.HIO3/c;2-1(3)4/h;(H,2,3,4)/q+1;/p-1 Key: YSVXTGDPTJIEIX-REWHXWOFAH
- SMILES: [Ag+].[O-]I(=O)=O

Properties
| Chemical formula | AgIO_{3} |
| Molar mass | 282.77 g/mol |
| Appearance | white crystals |
| Odor | odorless |
| Density | 5.525 g/cm^{3} |
| Melting point | ~200 °C |
| Boiling point | ~1150 °C |
| Solubility in water | 0.003 g/100 mL (10 °C); 0.019 g/100 mL (50 °C) |
| Solubility product (K_{sp}) | 3.17×10^{−8} |
| Solubility | soluble in ammonia |

Structure
| Crystal structure | orthorhombic |

Hazards
- GHS labelling
| Pictograms | (GHS03: Oxidizing) (GHS07: Exclamation mark) |
| Signal word | Danger |
| Hazard statements | H272, H315, H319, H335 |
| Precautionary statements | P210, P220, P261, P264, P264+P265, P271, P280, P302+P352, P304+P340, P305+P351+P338, P319, P321, P332+P317, P337+P317, P362+P364, P370+P378, P403+P233, P405, P501 |
| NFPA 704 (fire diamond) | 2 1 0 |
| Flash point | Non-combustable |

Related compounds
| Other anions | silver iodide silver chlorate |
| Other cations | sodium iodate potassium iodate |
- Except where otherwise noted, data are given for materials in their standard state (at 25 °C [77 °F], 100 kPa). verify (what is ?) Infobox references

Silver iodate (AgIO_{3}) is a light-sensitive, white crystal composed of silver, iodine and oxygen. Unlike most metal iodates, it is practically insoluble in water.

== Production ==
Silver iodate can be obtained by reacting silver nitrate (AgNO_{3}) with sodium iodate or potassium iodate. The by-product of the reaction is sodium nitrate.

Alternatively, it can be created by the action of iodine in a solution of silver oxide.

== Uses ==
Silver iodate is used to detect traces of chlorides in blood.
