= Ammonium bromate =

Identifiers
| CAS Number | 13843-59-9 |
| 3D model (JSmol) | Interactive image |
| ChemSpider | 55594 |
| ECHA InfoCard | 100.034.137 |
| EC Number | 237-566-5 |
| PubChem CID | 61691 |
| UNII | 237-566-5 |
| CompTox Dashboard (EPA) | DTXSID00160678 |
- InChI: InChI=1S/BrHO3.H3N/c2-1(3)4;/h(H,2,3,4);1H3 Key: BEOODBYKENEKIC-UHFFFAOYSA-N
- SMILES: [NH4+].[O-]Br(=O)=O

Properties
| Chemical formula | NH_{4}BrO_{3} |
| Molar mass | 145.940 g·mol^{−1} |
| Appearance | colorless hexagonal crystals |
| Melting point | Explodes |
| Solubility in water | soluble |
- Except where otherwise noted, data are given for materials in their standard state (at 25 °C [77 °F], 100 kPa). Infobox references

Ammonium bromate is a chemical compound with the chemical formula NH_{4}BrO_{3}.

== Synthesis ==
Ammonium bromate can be prepared by combining aqueous solutions of ammonium chloride and sodium bromate. The product precipitates out upon cooling and can be collected by filtration:

NH_{4}Cl + NaBrO_{3} → NH_{4}BrO_{3} + NaCl

== Physical properties ==
Ammonium bromate forms colorless crystals, soluble in water, but poorly soluble in ethanol.

It is a severe explosion hazard.

== Chemical properties ==
Ammonium bromate is a very unstable compound that slowly decomposes at −3 °C (27 °F; 270 K):

4 NH_{4}BrO_{3} → NH_{4}NO_{3} + 2 Br_{2} + O_{2} + N_{2}O + 6 H_{2}O

If heated to 54 °C (129 °F; 327 K) (or randomly when stored at room temperature) it explodes, leaving no solid residues:

2 NH_{4}BrO_{3} → N_{2} + Br_{2} + O_{2} + 4 H_{2}O

It also decomposes significantly when stored in a desiccator containing calcium chloride, changing color to yellow and then reddish brown.
