= Silver chlorite =

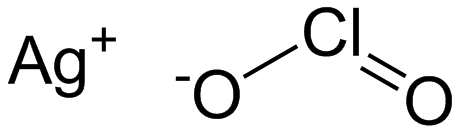

Names
- IUPAC name Silver chlorite
- Other names: Silver(I) chlorite

Identifiers
CAS Number	7783-91-7
3D model (JSmol)	Interactive image
ChemSpider	8031311
PubChem CID	9855611
- InChI: InChI=1S/Ag.ClHO2/c;2-1-3/h;(H,2,3)/q+1;/p-1
- SMILES: [O-]Cl=O.[Ag+]

Properties
Chemical formula	AgClO_{2}
Molar mass	175.32 g/mol
Appearance	Slightly yellow solid
Melting point	156 °C (313 °F; 429 K) (decomposes)
Solubility in water	0.45 g/100ml
Refractive index (n_{D})	2.1

Structure
Crystal structure	Orthorhombic
Space group	Pcca
Lattice constant	a = 6.075 Å, b = 6.689 Å, c = 6.123 Å

Thermochemistry
Heat capacity (C)	20.81 cal/deg
Std molar entropy (S^{⦵}_{298})	32.16 cal/deg
Std enthalpy of formation (Δ_{f}H^{⦵}_{298})	0.0 kcal/mol

Hazards
- GHS labelling
Pictograms	(GHS01: Explosive)

Related compounds
Other anions	Silver chlorate Silver perchlorate Silver hypochlorite
Other cations	Sodium chlorite
- Except where otherwise noted, data are given for materials in their standard state (at 25 °C [77 °F], 100 kPa). Infobox references

Silver chlorite is a chemical compound with the formula AgClO_{2}. This slightly yellow solid is shock sensitive and has an orthorhombic crystal structure.

== Preparation ==
Silver chlorite is prepared by the reaction of silver nitrate and sodium chlorite:

AgNO_{3} + NaClO_{2} → AgClO_{2} + NaNO_{3}

== Reactions and properties ==
If normally heated, it explodes violently at 105 °C:

AgClO_{2} → AgCl + O_{2}

If heated very carefully, it decomposes at 156 °C to form silver chloride. It can also decompose to silver chlorate if chlorous acid is present.

Silver chlorite reacts explosively with various substances such as sulfur and hydrochloric acid, forming silver chloride. It also gets reduced by sulfur dioxide, and reacts with sulfuric acid to form chlorine dioxide. This compound explodes in contact with iodomethane and iodoethane.

== Silver chlorite complexes ==
Silver chlorite can react with anhydrous ammonia to form triammonia-silver chlorite:

AgClO_{2} + 3NH_{3} → 3NH_{3}·AgClO_{2}
