= Ammonium iodate =

- Ammonium cation

Names
- IUPAC name Ammonium iodate
- Other names Iodic acid, ammonium salt

Identifiers
CAS Number	13446-09-8
3D model (JSmol)	Interactive image
ChemSpider	145937
ECHA InfoCard	100.033.252
EC Number	236-592-4
PubChem CID	166805
CompTox Dashboard (EPA)	DTXSID60928630
- InChI: InChI=1S/HIO3.H3N/c2-1(3)4;/h(H,2,3,4);1H3 Key: ZRDJERPXCFOFCP-UHFFFAOYSA-N
- SMILES: [NH4+].[O-]I(=O)=O

Properties
Chemical formula	NH_{4}IO_{3}
Molar mass	192.94 g/mol
Appearance	white crystalline powder
Density	3.309 g/cm^{3}
Melting point	decomposes at 150 °C
Solubility in water	29.883 g/L (25 °C)
Magnetic susceptibility (χ)	−62.3·10^{−6} cm^{3}/mol
- Except where otherwise noted, data are given for materials in their standard state (at 25 °C [77 °F], 100 kPa). Infobox references

Ammonium iodate is an inorganic salt which is sparingly soluble in cold, and moderately soluble in hot water, like all iodate salts, it is a strong oxidizer.

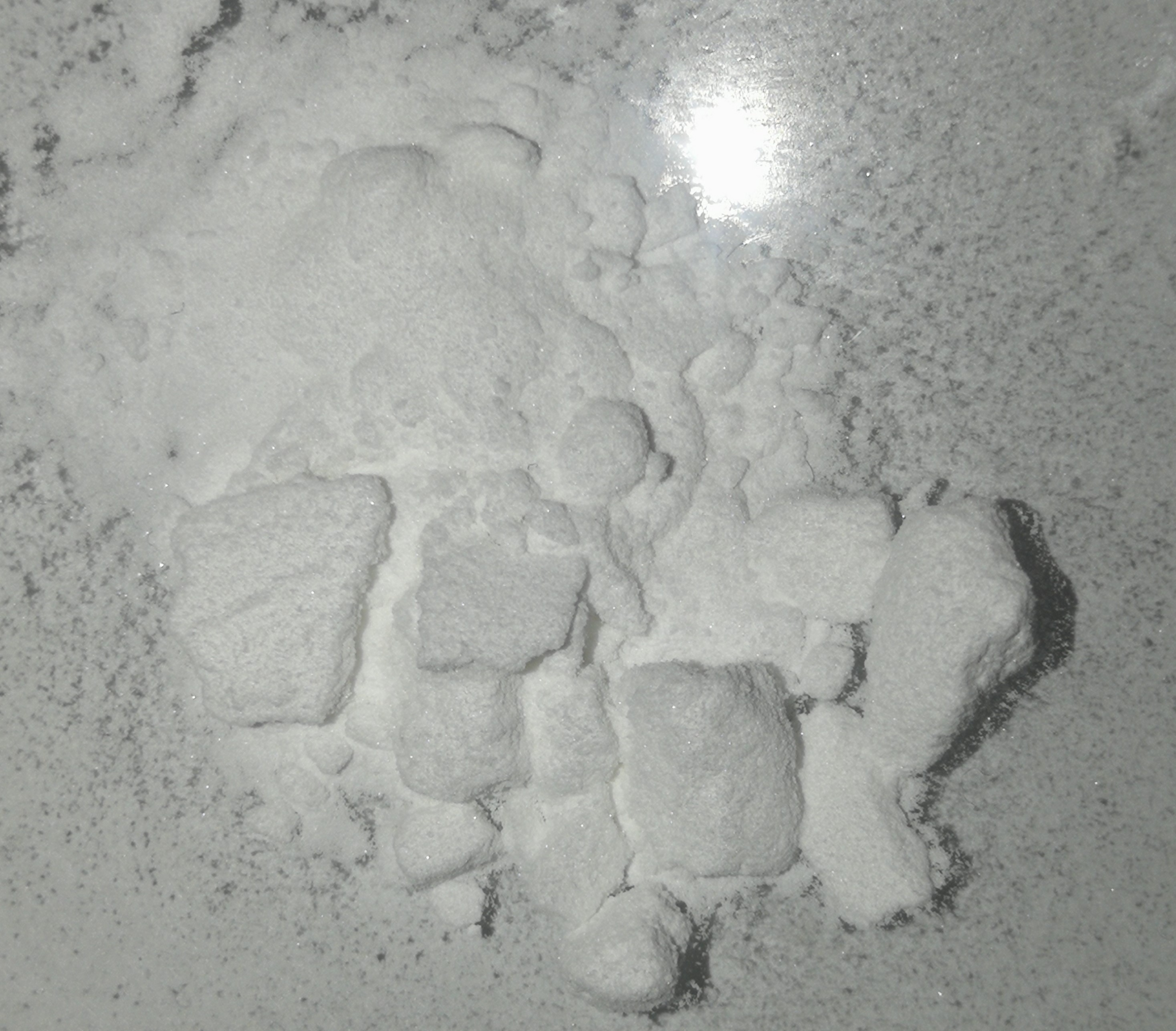
Ammonium Iodate

== Preparation ==
Ammonium iodate can be obtained by neutralising a solution of iodic acid with ammonia.

HIO_{3} + NH_{3} → NH_{4}IO_{3}

Using its low solubility in water, it can also be precipitated from an iodate solution with an ammonium salt.

2 KIO_{3} + (NH_{4})_{2}SO_{4} → 2 NH_{4}IO_{3} + K_{2}SO_{4}

Unlike other iodates, ammonium iodate can't be prepared by dissolving iodine in an ammonium hydroxide solution, instead the highly explosive nitrogen triiodide is formed.

3 I_{2} + 5 NH_{3} → 3 NH_{4}I + NH_{3}·NI_{3}

== Chemical properties ==
Because ammonium iodate consists of the reducing ammonium ion and the oxidizing iodate ion, it already starts to decompose at 150 °C into nitrogen, oxygen, iodine and water.

NH_{4}IO_{3} → 1/2N_{2} + 1/2O_{2} + 1/2I_{2} + 2H_{2}O

Below 60 °C this reaction cannot sustain itself, but with catalysts like potassium dichromate or copper(II) chloride it can also combust at room temperature.

== Safety ==
Like all iodates, ammonium iodate is a strong oxidizer and should therefore be kept away from flammable materials like sulfur, phosphorus and metals powders.
