= Praseodymium bromate =

Identifiers
CAS Number	anhydrous: 15162-93-3; tetrahydrate: 25822-26-8; nonahydrate: 13494-86-5
3D model (JSmol)	anhydrous: Interactive image; tetrahydrate: Interactive image; nonahydrate: Interactive image
ChemSpider	anhydrous: 20082430
ECHA InfoCard	100.035.636
EC Number	anhydrous: 239-216-7
PubChem CID	anhydrous: 21149370
CompTox Dashboard (EPA)	anhydrous: DTXSID10164824
- InChI: InChI=1S/3BrHO3.Pr/c3*2-1(3)4;/h3*(H,2,3,4);/q;;;+3/p-3 Key: GGRFBEZDBAZSBG-UHFFFAOYSA-K
- SMILES: anhydrous: [O-]Br(=O)=O.[O-]Br(=O)=O.[O-]Br(=O)=O.[Pr+3]; tetrahydrate: [O-]Br(=O)=O.[O-]Br(=O)=O.[O-]Br(=O)=O.[Pr+3].O.O.O.O; nonahydrate: [O-]Br(=O)=O.[O-]Br(=O)=O.[O-]Br(=O)=O.[Pr+3].O.O.O.O.O.O.O.O.O

Properties
Chemical formula	Pr(BrO_{3})_{3}
Molar mass	524.61
Appearance	green crystals (hydrate)
Melting point	56.5 °C (nonahydrate)
Boiling point	150 °C (decomposes)
Solubility in water	56 g（0 °C） 92 g（20 °C）
- Except where otherwise noted, data are given for materials in their standard state (at 25 °C [77 °F], 100 kPa). Infobox references

Praseodymium bromate is an inorganic compound with the chemical formula Pr(BrO_{3})_{3}. It is soluble in water and can form the dihydrate, tetrahydrate and nonahydrate. The nonahydrate melts in its own crystal water at 56.5 °C and completely loses its crystal water at 130 °C. It can be produced by the reaction of barium bromate and praseodymium sulfate.
