= Silver sulfite =

- Skeletal formula of silver sulfite

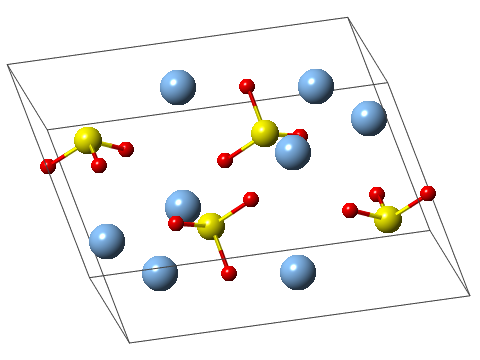
- Crystal structure of silver sulfite

Names
- IUPAC name Silver(I) sulfite, Silver sulfite

Identifiers
CAS Number	13465-98-0
3D model (JSmol)	Interactive image
ChemSpider	2341258
ECHA InfoCard	100.033.362
EC Number	236-714-6
PubChem CID	3084149
CompTox Dashboard (EPA)	DTXSID90889609
- InChI: InChI=1S/2Ag.H2O3S/c;;1-4(2)3/h;;(H2,1,2,3)/q2*+1;/p-2 Key: WYCFMBAHFPUBDS-UHFFFAOYSA-L
- SMILES: [O-]S(=O)[O-].[Ag+].[Ag+]

Properties
Chemical formula	Ag_{2}O_{3}S
Molar mass	295.79 g·mol^{−1}
Appearance	White crystals
Odor	Odorless
Melting point	100 °C (212 °F; 373 K) decomposes
Solubility in water	4.6 mg/L (20 °C)
Solubility product (K_{sp})	1.5·10^{−14}
Solubility	Soluble in aq. NH_{4}OH, alkali sulfites, AcOH; Decomposes in strong acids Insoluble in liquid SO_{2}

Structure
Crystal structure	Monoclinic, mP24
Space group	P2_{1}/c, No. 14
Point group	2/m
Lattice constant	a = 4.6507 Å, b = 7.891 Å, c = 11.173 Å α = 90°, β = 120.7°, γ = 90°

Hazards
- GHS labelling
Pictograms	(GHS07: Exclamation mark)
Signal word	Warning
Hazard statements	H315, H319, H335
Precautionary statements	P261, P305+P351+P338
- Except where otherwise noted, data are given for materials in their standard state (at 25 °C [77 °F], 100 kPa). verify (what is ?) Infobox references

Silver sulfite is the chemical compound with the formula Ag_{2}SO_{3}. This unstable silver compound when heated and/or in light it decomposes to silver dithionate and silver sulfate.

== Preparation ==
Silver sulfite can be prepared by dissolving silver nitrate with the stoichiometric quantity of sodium sulfite solution, yielding a precipitation of silver sulfite by the following reaction:

2 AgNO_{3} + Na_{2}SO_{3} ⇌ Ag_{2}SO_{3} + 2 NaNO_{3}

After precipitation then filtering silver sulfite, washing it using well-boiled water, and drying it in vacuum.
