= AKZO Chemie BV v Commission =

Decision of the European Court of Justice in 1991

- Court: Court of Justice of the EU
- Decided: 3 July 1991
- Citation: (1991) C-62/86, [1991] ECR I-3359

Case history
- Prior action: Commission Decision 85/609/EEC

Court membership
- Judges sitting: J. C. Moitinho de Almeida, G. C. Rodríguez Iglesias, Sir Gordon Slynn, R. Joliet, M. Zuleeg

Case opinions
- Advocate General: C. O. Lenz

Keywords
- Abuse, predatory pricing, dominant position

AKZO Chemie BV v Commission (1991) C-62/86 is an EU competition law case, concerning monopoly and abuse of a dominant position through predatory pricing.

== Facts ==
Akzo Chemie BV manufactured chemicals, including benzoyl peroxide. This is used for bleaching flour and also as an initiator in the plastics industry. A competitor, ECS, originally sold benzonyl peroxide primarily in the flour sector but was expanding into the plastics market, Akzo's core business area. ECS had undercut Akzo's price to a major plastics customer (BASF), although there was no finding this was below ECS's own costs or abusive. Akzo did not want ECS to expand into plastics, and explicitly threatened ECS that if it did not withdraw, Akzo would retaliate by selling at lower prices specifically targeting ECS's customers in the flour market. Akzo followed through on its threat from late 1980, offering key flour additives to ECS's customers at prices significantly below both ECS's prices (by over 11% to 27% in some instances, equating to over £70-£100 per tonne) and below Akzo's own average total costs, while maintaining higher prices for its own comparable customers (selective pricing). This meant Akzo was selling these specific products at a loss as part of its strategy, sometimes even below its average variable costs. Internal documents showed Akzo had the intention to undercut their competitors to eliminate or discipline them. Other actions included using certain products (potassium bromate, vitamin mixes) as 'bait' at very low prices, obtaining competitors' offer details from customers, and imposing exclusive supply obligations, all aimed at drawing customers away from ECS and persuading it to withdraw from the plastics market. The Commission found Akzo violated TFEU art 102 (then EEC Treaty art 86) and imposed €10m fines. The relevant market was determined to be the overall organic peroxides market (not Akzo's proposed wider definition). Akzo was found dominant, with its market share of around 50% creating a presumption of dominance, and its share had remained steady from 1979 to 1982.

== Judgment ==
The ECJ held that Akzo had engaged in predatory pricing, and confirmed that a market share over 50% created a presumption of dominance. The Court upheld the Commission's finding of abuse, applying specific cost-based tests for predatory pricing:

60 With regard to market shares the Court has held that very large shares are in themselves, and save in exceptional circumstances, evidence of the existence of a dominant position (judgment in Case 85/76 Hoffman-La Roche v Commission [1979] ECR 461, paragraph 41). That is the situation where there is a market share of 50% such as that found to exist in this case.

...

71 Prices below average variable costs (that is to say, those which vary depending on the quantities produced) by means of which a dominant undertaking seeks to eliminate a competitor must be regarded as abusive. A dominant undertaking has no interest in applying such prices except that of eliminating competitors so as to enable it subsequently to raise its prices by taking advantage of its monopolistic position, since each sale generates a loss, namely the total amount of the fixed costs (that is to say, those which remain constant regardless of the quantities produced) and, at least, part of the variable costs relating to the unit produced.

72 Moreover, prices below average total costs, that is to say, fixed costs plus variable costs, but above average variable costs, must be regarded as abusive if they are determined as part of a plan for eliminating a competitor. Such prices can drive from the market undertakings which are perhaps as efficient as the dominant undertaking but which, because of their smaller financial resources, are incapable of withstanding the competition waged against them.

Applying these tests, the Court confirmed that Akzo's pricing below average total costs, motivated by a strategy to eliminate ECS, constituted an abuse of its dominant position. Although ECS had initially undercut Akzo's price when entering the plastics market, this was not deemed abusive as ECS was not dominant in that market. The Court largely upheld the Commission's decision but annulled it on minor points (related to comparing specific customer groups for the purpose of selective pricing) and reduced the fine from €10 million to €7.5 million, citing factors like the relative novelty of the law on predatory pricing, the limited actual impact on market shares, and the Commission improperly using certain conduct during the interim phase as an aggravating factor.

== See also ==
- EU law
- EU competition law
- Dominance (competition law)
