= Hafnium(IV) iodate =

Names
- IUPAC name Hafnium(IV) iodate

Identifiers
CAS Number	19630-06-9

Properties
Chemical formula	Hf(IO_{3})_{4}
Molar mass	878.11 g/mol
Appearance	Solid
Solubility in water	Very slightly soluble in water
- Except where otherwise noted, data are given for materials in their standard state (at 25 °C [77 °F], 100 kPa). Infobox references

Hafnium(IV) iodate, or hafnium iodate, is an inorganic compound of hafnium with the chemical formula Hf(IO_{3})_{4}.

== Properties ==
Hafnium(IV) iodate is only very slightly soluble in water. At 25 °C, the solubility of Hf(IO_{3})_{4} in water has been reported as approximately 4.2 × 10^{−6} mol kg^{−1}. It is also poorly soluble in acidic media.

In aqueous systems containing alkali-metal iodates, hafnium(IV) iodate can form solid solutions. Solid solutions based on Hf(IO_{3})_{4} have, for example, been reported in the LiIO_{3}–Hf(IO_{3})_{4}–H_{2}O, RbIO_{3}–Hf(IO_{3})_{4}–H_{2}O and CsIO_{3}–Hf(IO_{3})_{4}–H_{2}O systems.

== Preparation ==
Hafnium(IV) iodate can be prepared by reacting hydrated hafnium(IV) oxide with an aqueous solution of iodic acid. Depending on the reaction conditions, the acidic iodate HHf(IO_{3})_{5}·3H_{2}O can also be obtained.
