= Tetrachloroiodic acid =

Identifiers
3D model (JSmol)	Interactive image
- InChI: InChI=1S/Cl4I/c1-5(2,3)4/q-1/p+1 Key: VEFRWHPHQIYAIZ-UHFFFAOYSA-O
- SMILES: [H+].[Cl-][I3+]([Cl-])([Cl-])[Cl-]

Properties
Chemical formula	HICl_{4}
Appearance	Orange crystals (hydrate)
Melting point	19 °C (66 °F; 292 K) (hydrate)
- Except where otherwise noted, data are given for materials in their standard state (at 25 °C [77 °F], 100 kPa). Infobox references

Tetrachloroiodic acid is an inorganic compound with the formula HICl_{4}, which acts the only example of a stable acid derived from a polyhalide. An orange crystalline tetrahydrate is known. No anhydrous tetrachloroiodic acid is known to exist; rather, it is isolated as hydronium salts of the tetrachloroiodate anion. It is unstable in air.

== Synthesis ==
Tetrachloroiodic acid may be formed by dissolution of iodine trichloride in concentrated hydrochloric acid:

ICl_{3} + HCl → HICl_{4}

Tetrachloroiodic acid may also be made by adding hydrochloric acid to iodates or periodates, or by passing chlorine through a solution of iodine in concentrated hydrochloric acid,

I_{2} + 3 Cl_{2} + 2 HCl + 4 H_{2}O → 2 HICl_{4}

although it quickly decomposes into iodine and iodate when introduced into less acidic conditions.

== Physical properties ==
Tetrachloroiodic acid forms a crystal hydrate which has orange crystals that are unstable in air and melt by dissolving in their own water of crystallization at 19 °C. Crystals of HICl_{4}·4H_{2}O contain square planar tetrachloroiodate anions associated with various hydronium cations, such as H_{5}O^{+}_{2}, showing structural similarities to the hydrates of other chloride-based inorganic acids, most notably HAuCl_{4}·4H_{2}O.

== Related compounds ==
Hydrates of the sodium and potassium salts of the tetrachloroiodate anion (ICl^{−}_{4}) have been isolated, along with tetrachloroiodates of various alkaloids. The lighter alkali tetrachloroiodates tend to lose iodine over time, in the form of iodine trichloride:

KICl_{4} ⇌ KCl + ICl_{3}

Caesium tetrachloroiodate rapidly crashes out of solution when caesium chloride and aqueous potassium tetrachloroiodate are mixed. It is stable at room temperature and relatively insoluble in water.

The potassium salt of the corresponding iodine(I) anion, dichloroiodate (ICl^{−}_{2}), has been isolated. Caesium dichloroiodate is formed from the thermal decomposition of CsICl_{4}. ICl^{−}_{2} solutions are described as being dark orange, while ICl^{−}_{4} solutions are yellow. The ICl^{−}_{2} anion is linear.

== See also ==
- Iodine trichloride
