= Barium bromate =

Identifiers
CAS Number	13967-90-3 anhydrous; 10326-26-8 monohydrate
3D model (JSmol)	Interactive image
ChemSpider	58778378
ECHA InfoCard	100.034.304
EC Number	237-750-5
PubChem CID	61706
UNII	5QK4064Y0R
UN number	2719
CompTox Dashboard (EPA)	DTXSID10890671
- InChI: InChI=1S/Ba.2BrHO3/c;2*2-1(3)4/h;2*(H,2,3,4)/q+2;;/p-2 Key: VEASZGAADGZARC-UHFFFAOYSA-L; InChI=1S/Ba.2BrHO3/c;2*2-1(3)4/h;2*(H,2,3,4)/q+2;;/p-2
- SMILES: [O-]Br(=O)=O.[O-]Br(=O)=O.[Ba+2]

Properties
Chemical formula	Ba(BrO_{3})_{2} (anhydrous); Ba(BrO_{3})_{2}·H_{2}O (monohydrate)
Molar mass	393.131 g/mol (anhydrous); 411.147 g/mol (monohydrate)
Appearance	Colorless crystals (anhydrous); White crystals (monohydrate)
Density	3.99 g/cm^{3} (20 °C (68 °F), monohydrate)
Melting point	260 °C (500 °F; 533 K) (monohydrate, decomposes)
Solubility in water	0.79 g/100 g (anhydrous); 0.831 g/100 g (monohydrate)
Solubility product (K_{sp})	2.43×10^{−4} (anhydrous)
Solubility in acetone	soluble (anhydrous)

Structure
Crystal structure	Monoclinic

Hazards
- GHS labelling
Pictograms	(GHS03: Oxidizing) (GHS07: Exclamation mark)
Signal word	Warning
Hazard statements	H272, H302, H332
Precautionary statements	P210, P220, P261, P264, P270, P271, P280, P301+P317, P304+P340, P317, P330, P370+P378, P501
NFPA 704 (fire diamond)	2 0 0 OX
Threshold limit value (TLV)	0.5 mg/m^{3} (TWA)
- NIOSH (US health exposure limits)
PEL (Permissible)	0.5 mg/m^{3} (TWA)
REL (Recommended)	0.5 mg/m^{3} (TWA)
IDLH (Immediate danger)	50 mg/m^{3}

Related compounds
Other cations	Calcium bromate; Strontium bromate
- Except where otherwise noted, data are given for materials in their standard state (at 25 °C [77 °F], 100 kPa). Infobox references

Barium bromate is a chemical compound composed of the barium ion and the bromate ion, with the chemical formula of Ba(BrO_{3})_{2}.

== Preparation ==
Barium bromate monohydrate can be prepared by reacting potassium bromate or sodium bromate with barium chloride:

2 KBrO_{3} + BaCl_{2}·2H_{2}O → Ba(BrO_{3})_{2}·H_{2}O + 2 KCl + H_{2}O
