= Sodium iodate =

- Sodium iodate

Names
- Other names Iodic acid, sodium salt

Identifiers
| CAS Number | 7681-55-2 |
| 3D model (JSmol) | Interactive image |
| ChEBI | CHEBI:81708 |
| ChemSpider | 22760 |
| ECHA InfoCard | 100.028.793 |
| EC Number | 231-672-5 |
| KEGG | C18366 |
| PubChem CID | 23675764 |
| RTECS number | NN1400000 |
| UNII | U558PCS5Z9 |
| CompTox Dashboard (EPA) | DTXSID90858754 |
- InChI: InChI=1S/HIO3.Na/c2-1(3)4;/h(H,2,3,4);/q;+1/p-1 Key: WTCBONOLBHEDIL-UHFFFAOYSA-M; InChI=1/HIO3.Na/c2-1(3)4;/h(H,2,3,4);/q;+1/p-1 Key: WTCBONOLBHEDIL-REWHXWOFAB
- SMILES: [Na+].[O-]I(=O)=O

Properties
| Chemical formula | INaO_{3} |
| Molar mass | 197.891 g·mol^{−1} |
| Appearance | White orthorhombic crystals |
| Odor | Odorless |
| Density | 4.28 g/cm^{3} |
| Melting point | 425 °C (797 °F; 698 K) (anhydrous) decomposes 19.85 °C (67.73 °F; 293.00 K) (pentahydrate) |
| Solubility in water | 2.5 g/100 mL (0 °C); 8.98 g/100 mL (20 °C); 9.47 g/100 mL (25 °C); 32.59 g/100 mL (100 °C) |
| Solubility | Soluble in acetic acid Insoluble in alcohol |
| Solubility in dimethylformamide | 0.5 g/kg |
| Magnetic susceptibility (χ) | −53.0·10^{−6} cm^{3}/mol |

Structure
| Crystal structure | Orthorhombic |

Thermochemistry
| Heat capacity (C) | 125.5 J/mol·K |
| Std molar entropy (S^{⦵}_{298}) | 135 J/mol·K |
| Std enthalpy of formation (Δ_{f}H^{⦵}_{298}) | −490.4 kJ/mol |
| Gibbs free energy (Δ_{f}G^{⦵}) | 35.1 kJ/mol |

Hazards
- GHS labelling
| Pictograms | (GHS03: Oxidizing) (GHS07: Exclamation mark) (GHS08: Health hazard) |
| Signal word | Danger |
| Hazard statements | H272, H302, H317, H334 |
| Precautionary statements | P220, P261, P280, P342+P311 |
| NFPA 704 (fire diamond) | 1 0 1 OX |
- Lethal dose or concentration (LD, LC)
| LD_{50} (median dose) | 108 mg/kg (mice, intravenous) |

Related compounds
| Other anions | Sodium iodide Sodium periodate Sodium bromate Sodium chlorate |
| Other cations | Potassium iodate Silver iodate |
- Except where otherwise noted, data are given for materials in their standard state (at 25 °C [77 °F], 100 kPa). verify (what is ?) Infobox references

Sodium iodate (NaIO_{3}) is the sodium salt of iodic acid. Sodium iodate is an oxidizing agent. It has several uses.

== Preparation ==
It can be prepared by reacting a sodium-containing base such as sodium hydroxide with iodic acid, for example:

HIO_{3} + NaOH → NaIO_{3} + H_{2}O

It can also be prepared by adding iodine to a hot, concentrated solution of sodium hydroxide or sodium carbonate:

3 I_{2} + 6 NaOH → NaIO_{3} + 5 NaI + 3 H_{2}O

== Reactions ==
Sodium iodate can be oxidized to sodium periodate in water solutions by hypochlorites or other strong oxidizing agents:

NaIO_{3} + NaOCl → NaIO_{4} + NaCl

== Uses ==
The main use of sodium iodate in everyday life is in iodised salt. The other compounds which are used in iodised table salt are potassium iodate, potassium iodide, and sodium iodide. Sodium iodate comprises 15 to 50 mg per kilogram of applicable salt.

Sodium iodate is also used as a dough conditioner to strengthen the dough.

== Safety ==
Iodates combined with organic compounds form an explosive mixture.
