= Iodine chloride =

Iodine chloride may refer to:

- Iodine monochloride, ICl
- Iodine dichloride, ICl_{2}^{−}
- Iodine trichloride, ICl_{3}
