= Thyroid blocker =

Potassium iodide (KI) and potassium iodate (KIO_{3}) are called thyroid blockers when used in radiation protection.

If a person consumes a dose of one of these chemical compounds, his or her thyroid may saturate with stable iodine, preventing accumulation of radioactive iodine found after a nuclear meltdown or explosion.
