= Strontium bromate =

Names
- IUPAC name Strontium dibromate

Identifiers
CAS Number	14519-18-7
3D model (JSmol)	Interactive image
ChemSpider	7995221
ECHA InfoCard	100.035.013
EC Number	238-531-7
PubChem CID	9819472
UNII	1T54WJB20V
CompTox Dashboard (EPA)	DTXSID00162930
- InChI: Key: NAMOWWYAIVZKKA-UHFFFAOYSA-L; InChI=1S/2BrHO3.Sr/c2*2-1(3)4;/h2*(H,2,3,4);/q;;+2/p-2
- SMILES: [O-]Br(=O)=O.[O-]Br(=O)=O.[Sr+2]

Properties
Chemical formula	SrBr_{2}O_{6}
Molar mass	343.424 g/mol
Melting point	240 °C (464 °F; 513 K) (decomposes)
Solubility in water	27.2 g/100 mL
Magnetic susceptibility (χ)	−93.5·10^{−6} cm^{3}/mol

Related compounds
Other cations	calcium bromate barium bromate
- Except where otherwise noted, data are given for materials in their standard state (at 25 °C [77 °F], 100 kPa). Infobox references

Strontium bromate is a rarely considered chemical in the laboratory or in industries. It is, however, mentioned in the book Uncle Tungsten: Memories of a Chemical Boyhood by Oliver Sacks. There it is said that this salt glows when crystallized from a saturated aqueous solution. Chemically this salt is soluble in water, and is a moderately strong oxidizing agent.

Strontium bromate is toxic if ingested and irritates the skin and respiratory tract if it comes into contact with or inhaled, respectively. Its chemical formula is Sr(BrO_{3})_{2}.
