= Iodic acid =

Chemical compound (HIO3)

- Skeletal formula of iodic acid

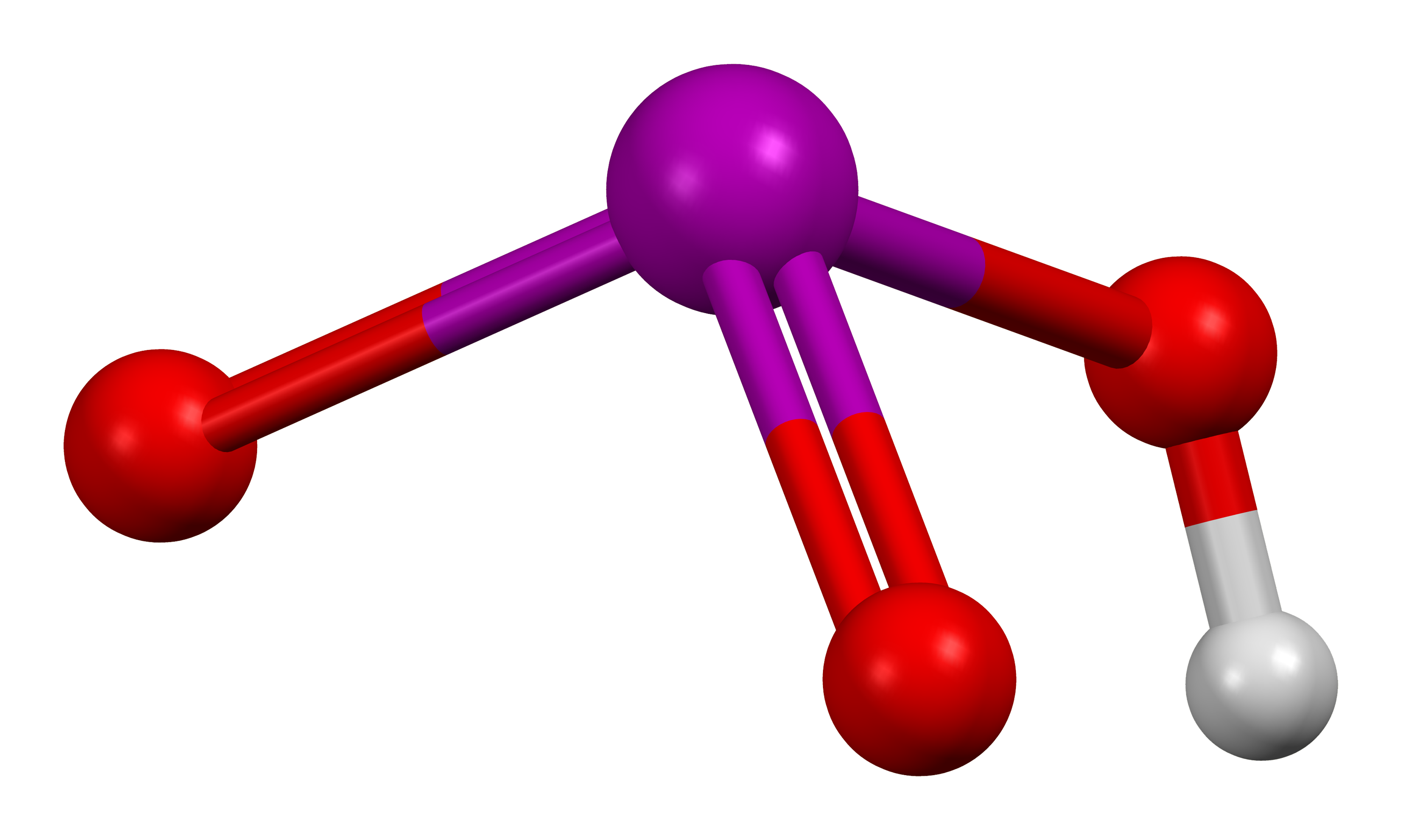
Ball-and-stick model of iodic acid
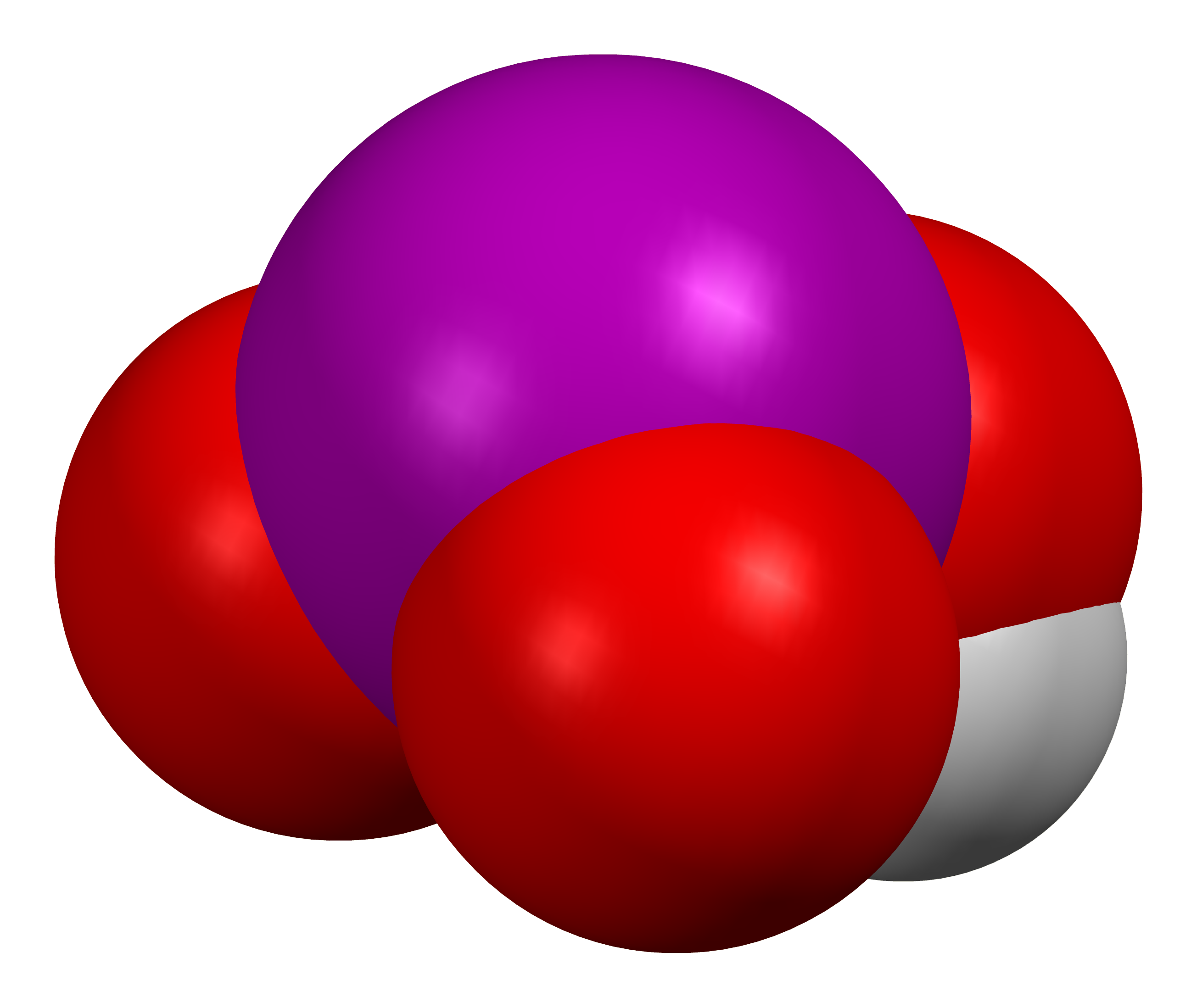
Space-filling model of iodic acid

Names
- Other names Iodic(V) acid

Identifiers
CAS Number	7782-68-5
3D model (JSmol)	Interactive image
ChEBI	CHEBI:24857
ChEMBL	ChEMBL1161636
ChemSpider	22761
ECHA InfoCard	100.029.056
PubChem CID	24345
UNII	6U8J18JSBM
CompTox Dashboard (EPA)	DTXSID2064812
- InChI: InChI=1S/HIO3/c2-1(3)4/h(H,2,3,4) Key: ICIWUVCWSCSTAQ-UHFFFAOYSA-N; InChI=1/HIO3/c2-1(3)4/h(H,2,3,4) Key: ICIWUVCWSCSTAQ-UHFFFAOYAT
- SMILES: O[I+2]([O-])[O-]

Properties
Chemical formula	HIO_{3}
Molar mass	175.909 g·mol^{−1}
Appearance	White solid
Density	4.62 g/cm^{3}, solid
Melting point	110 °C (230 °F; 383 K)
Solubility in water	269 g/100 mL (20 °C)
Acidity (pK_{a})	0.75
Conjugate base	Iodate
Magnetic susceptibility (χ)	−48.0·10^{−6} cm^{3}/mol

Hazards
- Occupational safety and health (OHS/OSH)
Main hazards	acid, corrosive, oxidant
- GHS labelling
Pictograms	(GHS03: Oxidizing) (GHS05: Corrosive)
Signal word	Danger
NFPA 704 (fire diamond)	3 0 1 OX
Flash point	Non-flammable

Related compounds
Other cations	Lithium iodate Potassium iodate
Related halogen oxoacids	Chloric acid Bromic acid
Related compounds	Hydroiodic acid Iodine pentoxide Periodic acid
- Except where otherwise noted, data are given for materials in their standard state (at 25 °C [77 °F], 100 kPa). verify (what is ?) Infobox references

Iodic acid is a white water-soluble solid with the chemical formula HIO_{3}. Its robustness contrasts with the instability of chloric acid and bromic acid. Iodic acid features iodine in the oxidation state +5 and is one of the most stable oxo-acids of the halogens. When heated, samples dehydrate to give iodine pentoxide. On further heating, the iodine pentoxide further decomposes, giving a mix of iodine and oxygen vapors.

== Preparation ==
Iodic acid can be produced by oxidizing iodine with strong oxidizers such as nitric acid, chlorine, chloric acid or hydrogen peroxide, for example:

I_{2} + 6 H_{2}O + 5 Cl_{2} ⇌ 2 HIO_{3} + 10HCl

Iodic acid is also produced by the hydrolysis of iodine chlorides,

5 ICl + 3 H_{2}O → 5 HCl + HIO_{3} + 2 I_{2}
5 ICl_{3} + 9 H_{2}O → 15 HCl + 3 HIO_{3} + I_{2}

although all methods involving chlorine in acidic conditions produce tetrachloroiodic acid as a byproduct:

HIO_{3} + 6 HCl ⇌ HICl_{4} + Cl_{2} + 3 H_{2}O

== Structure ==
Iodic acid crystallises from acidic solution as orthorhombic α-HIO_{3} in space group P2_{1}2_{1}2_{1}. The structure consists of pyramidal molecules linked by hydrogen bonding and intermolecular iodine-oxygen interactions. The I=O bond lengths are 1.81 Å while the I–OH distance is 1.89 Å. Several other polymorphs have been reported, including an orthorhombic γ form in space group Pbca and an orthorhombic δ form in space group P2_{1}2_{1}2_{1}. All of the polymorphs contain pyramidal molecules, hydrogen bonding and I···O interactions, but differ in packing arrangement.

== Properties ==
Iodic acid is a relatively strong acid with a pK_{a} of 0.75. It is strongly oxidizing in acidic solution, less so in basic solution. When iodic acid acts as oxidizer, then the product of the reaction is either elemental iodine or the iodide ion. Under some special conditions (very low pH and high concentration of chloride ions, such as in concentrated hydrochloric acid), iodic acid is reduced to iodine trichloride, a golden yellow compound which is present in solution as tetrachloroiodic acid. In the absence of chloride ions, when there is an excess amount of reductant, then all iodate is converted to iodide ion. When there is an excess amount of iodate, then part of the iodate is converted to iodine.

== Uses ==
Iodic acid is used as a strong acid (though it is not truly a strong acid, but a weak acid that is very close to being a strong acid) in analytical chemistry. It may be used to standardize solutions of both weak and strong bases, using methyl red or methyl orange as the indicator.

== Use in salt industry ==
Iodic acid can be used to synthesize sodium or potassium iodate for increasing iodine content of salt.

== Other oxyacids ==
Iodic acid is part of a series of oxyacids in which iodine can assume oxidation states of −1, +1, +3, +5, or +7. A number of neutral iodine oxides are also known.

Iodine oxidation state	−1	+1	+3	+5	+7
Name	Hydrogen iodide	Hypoiodous acid	Iodous acid	Iodic acid	Periodic acid
Formula	HI	HIO	HIO_{2}	HIO_{3}	HIO_{4} or H_{5}IO_{6}
