= Potassium tetrachloroiodate(III) =

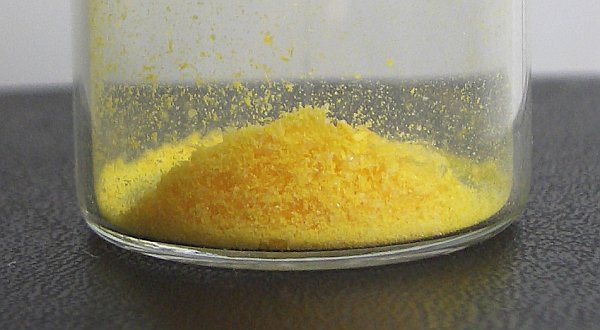

Identifiers
CAS Number	14323-44-5
3D model (JSmol)	Interactive image
ChemSpider	67168471
PubChem CID	23662692
CompTox Dashboard (EPA)	DTXSID70963830
- InChI: InChI=1S/Cl4I.K/c1-5(2,3)4;/q-1;+1 Key: IHRCHDIHZYZUCK-UHFFFAOYSA-N
- SMILES: Cl[I-](Cl)(Cl)Cl.[K+]

Properties
Chemical formula	KICl_{4}
Molar mass	307.80 g·mol^{−1}
Melting point	116 °C (241 °F; 389 K)
- Except where otherwise noted, data are given for materials in their standard state (at 25 °C [77 °F], 100 kPa). Infobox references

Potassium tetrachloroiodate(III) is a coordination compound with the chemical formula KICl_{4}. Its monohydrate crystal structure belongs to the monoclinic system and has the space group P2_{1}/n, yellow crystals.

== Synthesis ==
Potassium tetrachloroiodate(III) can be obtained by reacting iodine, potassium chlorate, and 6 mol/L hydrochloric acid solution containing 1.5 mol/L potassium chloride, condensing, filtering, and vacuum drying. The reaction is:

2 KClO_{3} + I_{2} ⇌ 2 KIO_{3} + Cl_{2}
KIO_{3} + 6 HCl ⇌ KICl_{4} + Cl_{2} + 3 H_{2}O
