= Calcium bromate =

Names
- IUPAC name Calcium bromate
- Other names bromic acid, calcium salt

Identifiers
CAS Number	10102-75-7
3D model (JSmol)	Interactive image
ChemSpider	55398
ECHA InfoCard	100.030.240
EC Number	233-278-9
E number	E924b (glazing agents, ...)
PubChem CID	61478
UNII	QJ2S78C3RO
CompTox Dashboard (EPA)	DTXSID30143676
- InChI: InChI=1S/2BrHO3.Ca/c2*2-1(3)4;/h2*(H,2,3,4);/q;;+2/p-2 Key: GROPHIUSZODNGU-UHFFFAOYSA-L; InChI=1/2BrHO3.Ca/c2*2-1(3)4;/h2*(H,2,3,4);/q;;+2/p-2 Key: GROPHIUSZODNGU-NUQVWONBAH
- SMILES: [Ca+2].[O-]Br(=O)=O.[O-]Br(=O)=O

Properties
Chemical formula	Ca(BrO_{3})_{2}
Molar mass	295.880 g·mol^{−1}
Appearance	White monoclinic crystals
Density	3.33 g/cm^{3}
Melting point	180 °C
Solubility in water	230 g/100 mL (20 °C)
Magnetic susceptibility (χ)	−84.0·10^{−6} cm^{3}/mol

Hazards
- GHS labelling
Pictograms	(GHS03: Oxidizing) (GHS07: Exclamation mark)
Signal word	Danger
Hazard statements	H272, H315, H319, H335
Precautionary statements	P210, P220, P261, P264, P264+P265, P271, P280, P302+P352, P304+P340, P305+P351+P338, P319, P321, P332+P317, P337+P317, P362+P364, P370+P378, P403+P233, P405, P501

Related compounds
Other anions	calcium bromide calcium chloride calcium sulfide
Other cations	strontium bromate barium bromate
- Except where otherwise noted, data are given for materials in their standard state (at 25 °C [77 °F], 100 kPa). verify (what is ?) Infobox references

Calcium bromate, Ca(BrO_{3})_{2}, is a calcium salt of bromic acid. It is most commonly encountered as the monohydrate, Ca(BrO_{3})_{2}•H_{2}O.

It can be prepared by reacting calcium hydroxide with sodium bromate or calcium sulfate with barium bromate. Above 180 °C, calcium bromate decomposes to form calcium bromide and oxygen. In theory, electrolysis of calcium bromide solution will also yield calcium bromate.

It is used as a bread dough and flour "improver" or conditioner (E number E924b) in some countries.
