= Silver chlorate =

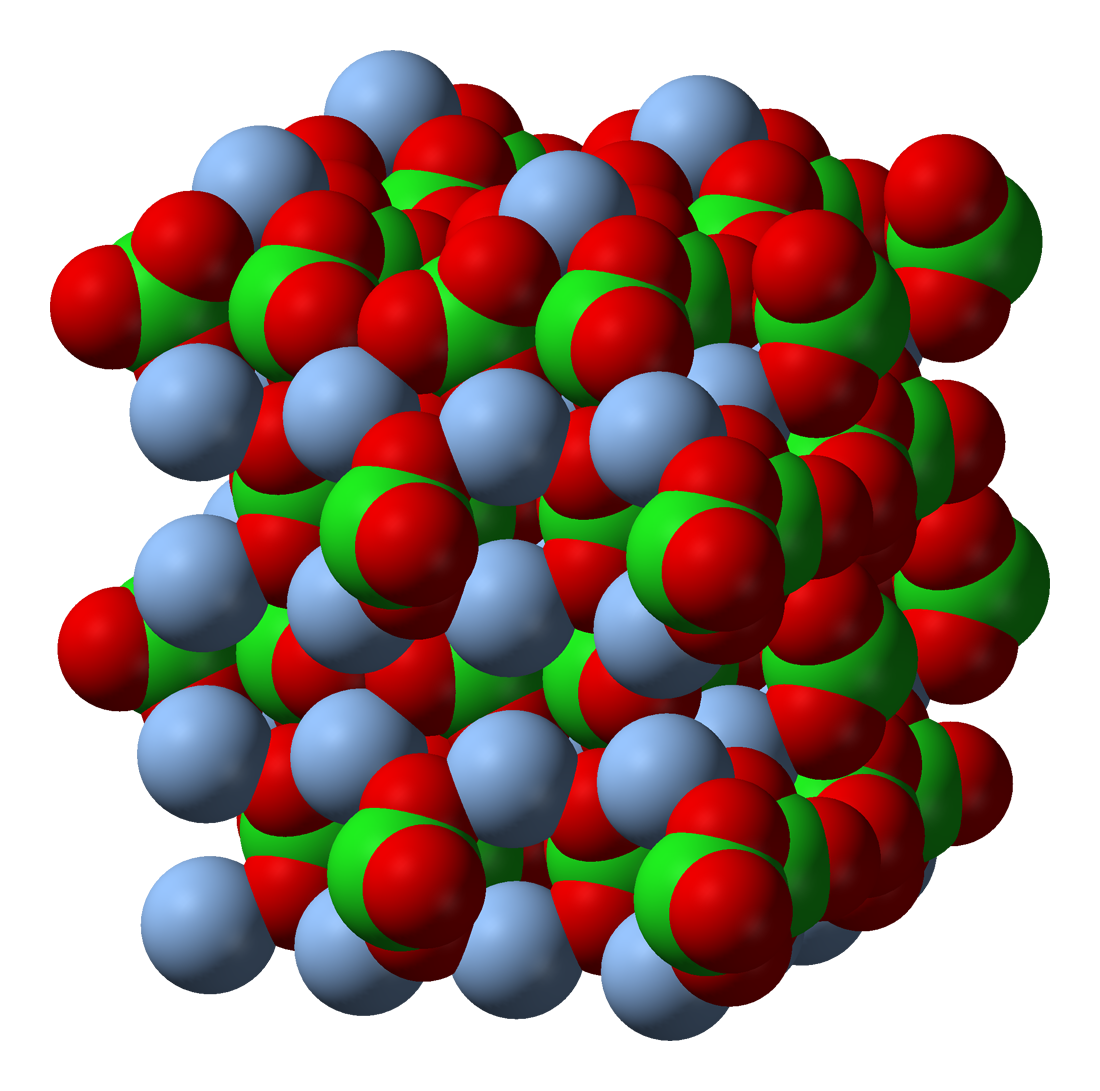
- Silver(I) chlorate

Names
- IUPAC name Silver(I) chlorate
- Systematic IUPAC name Silver(I) chlorate(V)
- Other names Argentous chlorate

Identifiers
CAS Number	7783-92-8
3D model (JSmol)	Interactive image
ChemSpider	7991255
ECHA InfoCard	100.029.122
EC Number	232-034-9
PubChem CID	9815505
UNII	O4T3J400JU
UN number	1479
CompTox Dashboard (EPA)	DTXSID50228454
- InChI: InChI=1S/Ag.ClHO3/c;2-1(3)4/h;(H,2,3,4)/q+1;/p-1 Key: SDLBJIZEEMKQKY-UHFFFAOYSA-M; InChI=1/Ag.ClHO3/c;2-1(3)4/h;(H,2,3,4)/q+1;/p-1 Key: SDLBJIZEEMKQKY-REWHXWOFAI
- SMILES: [Ag+].[O-]Cl(=O)=O

Properties
Chemical formula	AgClO_{3}
Molar mass	191.32 g·mol^{−1}
Appearance	white crystals
Density	4.43 g/cm^{3} (tetragonal); 4.21 g/cm^{3} (cubic)
Melting point	230 °C (446 °F; 503 K)
Boiling point	270 °C (518 °F; 543 K) (decomposes)
Solubility in water	17.6 g/100 g
Solubility in alcohols	soluble
Band gap	2.92 eV (cubic); 2.40 eV (tetragonal)

Structure (cubic)
Crystal structure	Cubic [198]
Space group	P2_{1}3̅
Point group	23
Lattice constant	a = 6.63 Å, b = 6.63 Å, c = 6.63 Å α = 90°, β = 90°, γ = 90°
Lattice volume (V)	291.06 Å^{3}
Formula units (Z)	4
Coordination geometry	Octahedral at Ag^{1+}; Trigonal planar at O^{2−}; Trigonal non-coplanar at Cl^{5+}

Structure (tetragonal)
Crystal structure	Tetragonal [87]
Space group	I4/m
Point group	4/m
Lattice constant	a = 8.67 Å, b = 8.67 Å, c = 8.17 Å α = 90°, β = 90°, γ = 90°
Lattice volume (V)	614.13 Å^{3}
Formula units (Z)	8
Coordination geometry	8-coordinate at Ag (1), distorted trigonal pyramidal at Ag (2); distorted single bond at O (1), trigonal planar at O (2); Trigonal non-coplanar at Cl

Thermochemistry
Std molar entropy (S^{⦵}_{298})	142.0 J⋅mol^{−1}⋅K^{−1}
Std enthalpy of formation (Δ_{f}H^{⦵}_{298})	−30.3 kJ⋅mol^{−1}
Gibbs free energy (Δ_{f}G^{⦵})	64.5 kJ⋅mol^{−1}

Hazards
- GHS labelling
Pictograms	(GHS03: Oxidizing) (GHS07: Exclamation mark)
Signal word	Danger
Hazard statements	H272, H315, H319, H335
Precautionary statements	P210, P220, P221, P261, P264, P271, P280, P302+P352, P304+P340+P312, P305+P351+P338, P332+P313, P337+P313, P362, P370+P378, P403+P233, P405, P501
NFPA 704 (fire diamond)	2 0 2 OX
Threshold limit value (TLV)	0.01 mg/m^{3} (TWA)
- NIOSH (US health exposure limits)
PEL (Permissible)	0.01 mg/m^{3}
REL (Recommended)	0.01 mg/m^{3} (TWA)

Related compounds
Other anions	Silver bromate; Silver iodate; Silver perchlorate
Other cations	Cobalt(II) chlorate; Copper chlorate; Zinc chlorate
Related compounds	Silver chloride; Silver(I) fluoride; Silver(II) fluoride; Silver(I) nitrate
- Except where otherwise noted, data are given for materials in their standard state (at 25 °C [77 °F], 100 kPa). verify (what is ?) Infobox references

Silver chlorate is an inorganic compound with molecular formula AgClO_{3}. It exists in two forms: white tetragonal prisms, and cubic crystals. Like all chlorates, it is water-soluble and an oxidizing agent. It is light-sensitive, so it must be stored in tightly closed dark-coloured containers.

== Production ==
Silver chlorate is produced by the reaction of silver nitrate with sodium chlorate to produce both silver chlorate and sodium nitrate:

AgNO_{3} + NaClO_{3} → AgClO_{3} + NaNO_{3}

Alternatively, it may be produced by the bubbling of chlorine gas through a suspension of silver oxide (Ag_{2}O), or by dissolving Ag_{2}O or metallic silver in chloric acid.

== Structure ==
AgClO_{3} normally exists as tetragonal crystals which undergo a transition to a cubic phase at 139 °C (282 °F).

== Safety ==
Aside from the potential dangers associated with strong oxidizers, silver chlorate may cause argyria, eye irritation, skin irritation, and temporary respiratory issues.

It also has the potential to detonate when heated very rapidly, or from mechanical shock. If exposed to ammonia it may form the explosive complex triamminesilver chlorate (AgClO_{3}·3NH_{3}).
