= Potassium bromate =

Chemical compound

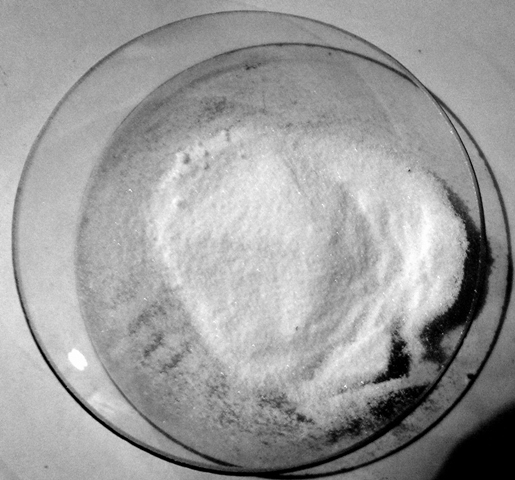

Names
- IUPAC name Potassium bromate
- Other names: Potassium bromate(V); Bromic acid, potassium salt

Identifiers
CAS Number	7758-01-2
3D model (JSmol)	Interactive image
ChEBI	CHEBI:38211
ChEMBL	ChEMBL2311074
ChemSpider	22852
ECHA InfoCard	100.028.936
EC Number	231-829-8
Gmelin Reference	15380
KEGG	C19295
PubChem CID	23673461
RTECS number	EF8725000
UNII	04MB35W6ZA
UN number	1484
CompTox Dashboard (EPA)	DTXSID6020195
- InChI: InChI=1S/BrHO3.K/c2-1(3)4;/h(H,2,3,4);/q;+1/p-1 Key: OCATYIAKPYKMPG-UHFFFAOYSA-M; InChI=1/BrHO3.K/c2-1(3)4;/h(H,2,3,4);/q;+1/p-1 Key: OCATYIAKPYKMPG-REWHXWOFAM
- SMILES: [K+].[O-]Br(=O)=O

Properties
Chemical formula	KBrO_{3}
Molar mass	166.999 g·mol^{−1}
Appearance	white crystalline powder
Density	3.27 g/cm³
Melting point	350 °C (662 °F; 623 K)
Boiling point	370 °C (698 °F; 643 K) (decomposes)
Solubility in water	3.1 g/100 mL (0 °C); 6.91 g/100 mL (20 °C); 13.3 g/100 mL (40 °C); 49.7 g/100 mL (100 °C)
Solubility	Insoluble in acetone
Magnetic susceptibility (χ)	−52.6·10^{−6} cm³/mol

Structure
Crystal structure	Rhombohedral
Space group	R3m
Lattice constant	a = 6.011, c = 8.152

Thermochemistry
Std enthalpy of formation (Δ_{f}H^{⦵}_{298})	−342.5 kJ/mol

Hazards
- GHS labelling
Pictograms	(GHS03: Oxidizing) (GHS06: Toxic) (GHS08: Health hazard)
Signal word	Danger
Hazard statements	H271, H301, H350
Precautionary statements	P201, P202, P210, P220, P221, P264, P270, P280, P281, P283, P301+P310, P306+P360, P308+P313, P321, P330, P370+P378, P371+P380+P375, P405, P501
NFPA 704 (fire diamond)	3 0 2 OX
Flash point	Non-flammable
- Lethal dose or concentration (LD, LC)
LD_{50} (median dose)	157 mg/kg (oral, rat)
Safety data sheet (SDS)	"ICSC 1115".

Related compounds
Other anions	Potassium chlorate Potassium iodate
Other cations	Sodium bromate Calcium bromate
- Except where otherwise noted, data are given for materials in their standard state (at 25 °C [77 °F], 100 kPa). verify (what is ?) Infobox references

Potassium bromate (KBrO_{3}) is the inorganic compound with the formula KBrO_{3}. This colorless salt is a common source of bromate. It is a strong oxidizing agent. The chemical is sometimes added to improve flour, but due to potential cancer risk, is banned in many countries.

== Preparation and structure ==
Potassium bromate is produced when bromine is passed through a hot solution of potassium hydroxide. Initially formed is potassium hypobromite, which quickly disproportionates into bromide and bromate:

3 BrO^{−} ⇌ 2 Br^{−} + BrO^{−}_{3}

Electrolysis of potassium bromide solutions will also give bromate. Both processes are analogous to those used in the production of chlorates. Because it can be obtained in high purity, potassium bromate is used as an analytical reagent ("primary standard").

Potassium bromate can separated from the potassium bromide owing to its lower solubility. When a solution containing potassium bromate and bromide is cooled to 0 °C, nearly all bromate salt will precipitate, while nearly all of the bromide salt will stay in solution.

As established by X-ray crystallography, the O-Br-O angles are 104.5°, consistent with its pyramidal shape of the anion. The Br-O distances are 1.66 Å.

== Reactions ==
Potassium bromate has some uses as a reagent in organic synthesis. In the presence of acid, it serves as a source of Br^{+} and can thus be used to brominate otherwise recalcitrant aromatic substrates, such as nitrobenzene. When treated with acid in the presence of bromide salts, potassium bromate serves as a source of bromine:

3 RCH=CHR' + KBrO_{3} + 5 Br^{−} + 6 H^{+} → 3 RCH(Br)−C(Br)HR' + 3 H_{2}O

Aryl iodides can be oxidized with potassium bromate to the corresponding iodinane oxides.

== Uses in baking ==
Potassium bromate is typically used in the United States as a flour improver (E number E924). It acts to strengthen the dough and to allow higher rising. It is an oxidizing agent, and under the right conditions, is reduced to bromide in the baking process. However, if too much is added, or if the bread is underbaked or baked at a low enough temperature, then a residual amount remains, which may be harmful if consumed.

Potassium bromate may be used in the production of malt barley, but under safety conditions prescribed by the U.S. Food and Drug Administration (FDA), including labeling standards for the finished product. It is a powerful oxidizer (electrode potential $E^\ominus$ = 1.5 volts, similar to potassium permanganate).

=== Regulations affecting food use ===
Potassium bromate is classified as a category 2B carcinogen by the IARC. The FDA allowed the use of bromate before the Delaney clause of the Food, Drug, and Cosmetic Act—which bans potentially carcinogenic substances—went into effect in 1958. Since 1991, the FDA has urged bakers not to use it, but has not mandated a ban.

Japanese baked goods manufacturers stopped using potassium bromate voluntarily in 1980; however, Yamazaki Baking resumed its use in 2005, claiming it had new production methods to reduce the amount of the chemical that remained in the final product. A 2008 book claiming that Yamazaki Bread products do not mold because of potassium bromate use remained on best-seller charts for over 1 year. In February 2014 Yamazaki Baking suspended its use as an additive citing supply difficulties. They announced resumed potassium bromate use in March 2020.

Potassium bromate is banned from food products in the European Union, Argentina, Brazil, Canada, Nigeria, South Korea, and Peru. It was banned in Sri Lanka in 2001, China in 2005, and India in 2016, but it is allowed in most of the United States. As of May 2023, the U.S. state of New York is considering banning the use of potassium bromate.

In California, a warning label is required when bromated flour is used. In October 2023, California enacted a law that banned the manufacture, sale, and distribution of potassium bromate (along with three other additives: brominated vegetable oil, propylparaben, and Red 3). The law takes effect in 2027. It was the first U.S. state to ban it.
