= Ytterbium(III) sulfate =

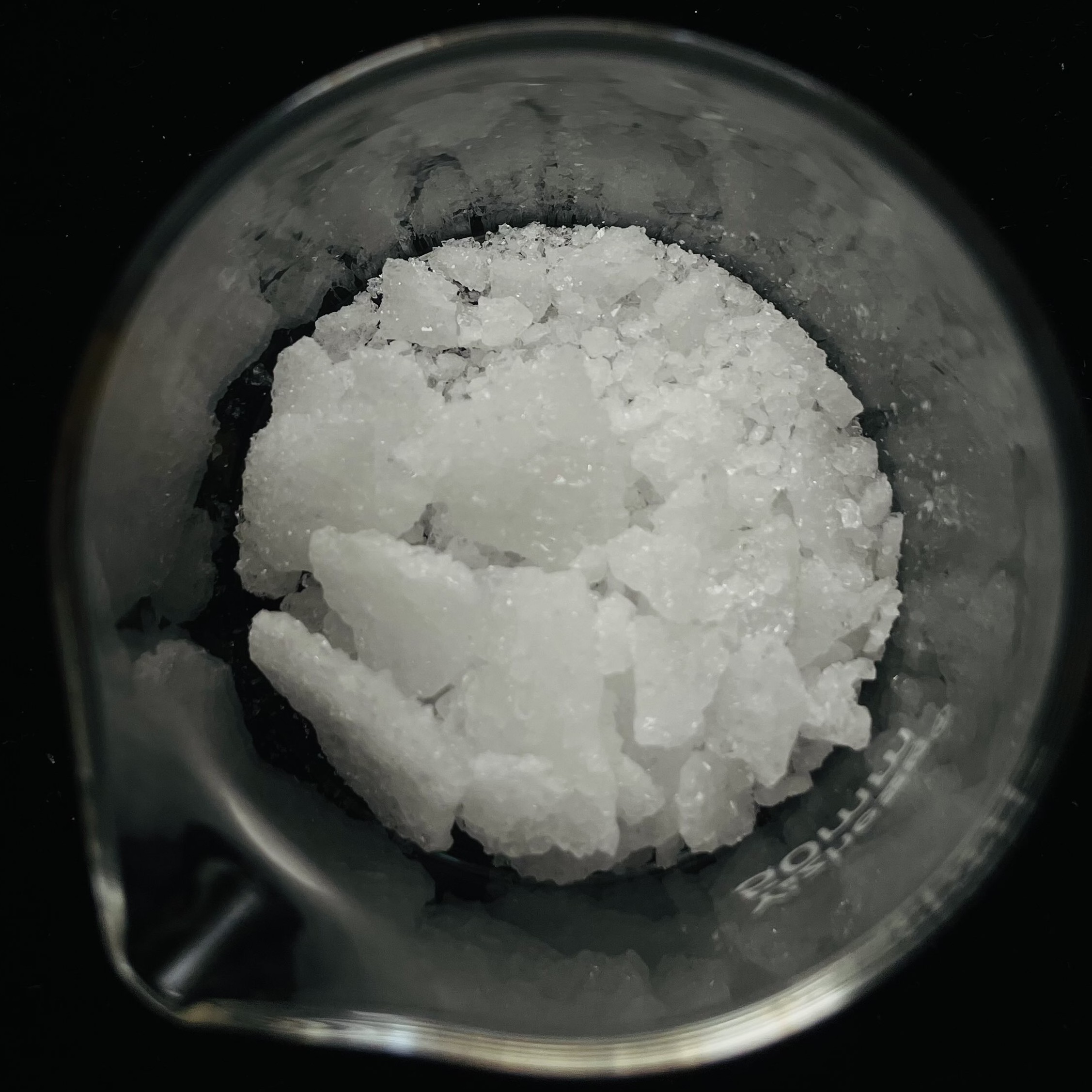
- Octahydrate

Names
- IUPAC name ytterbium(+3) cation sulfate
- Systematic IUPAC name ytterbium(+3) cation sulfate

Identifiers
CAS Number	anhydrous:: 13469-97-1; octahydrate:: 10034-98-7
3D model (JSmol)	anhydrous:: Interactive image; octahydrate:: Interactive image
ChemSpider	anhydrous:: 19990305
ECHA InfoCard	100.033.374
EC Number	anhydrous:: 236-727-7
PubChem CID	anhydrous:: 121488052; octahydrate:: 25022290
UNII	anhydrous:: SW73894EYV; octahydrate:: E5W6DO92VS
CompTox Dashboard (EPA)	anhydrous:: DTXSID40890700
- InChI: anhydrous:: InChI=1S/3H2O4S.2Yb/c3*1-5(2,3)4;;/h3*(H2,1,2,3,4);; Key: XLSAVKCEHVNUQT-UHFFFAOYSA-N; octahydrate:: InChI=1S/3H2O4S.8H2O.2Yb/c3*1-5(2,3)4;;;;;;;;;;/h3*(H2,1,2,3,4);8*1H2;;/q;;;;;;;;;;;2*+3/p-6 Key: MDOSIOHMOWGVIM-UHFFFAOYSA-H
- SMILES: anhydrous:: OS(=O)(=O)O.OS(=O)(=O)O.OS(=O)(=O)O.[Yb].[Yb]; octahydrate:: O.O.O.O.O.O.O.O.[O-]S(=O)(=O)[O-].[O-]S(=O)(=O)[O-].[O-]S(=O)(=O)[O-].[Yb+3].[Yb+3]

Properties
Chemical formula	Yb_{2}(SO_{4})_{3}
Molar mass	778.39
Appearance	Colorless crystals (octahydrate)
Solubility in water	Soluble

Hazards
- GHS labelling
Pictograms	(GHS07: Exclamation mark)
Signal word	Warning
Hazard statements	H315, H319, H335
- Except where otherwise noted, data are given for materials in their standard state (at 25 °C [77 °F], 100 kPa). Infobox references

Ytterbium(III) sulfate (ytterbium sulphate) is a ytterbium salt of sulfuric acid, with formula Yb_{2}(SO_{4})_{3}. It is used mostly for research. This compound's solubility decreases with increasing temperature.
