= Sodium bromate =

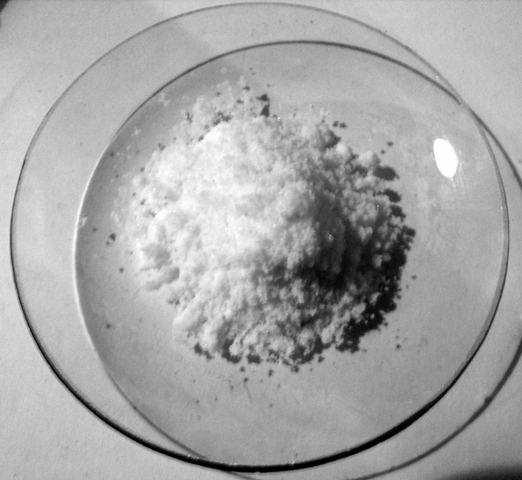
- Sodium bromate

Names
- IUPAC name Sodium bromate
- Other names Sodium bromate(V); Bromic acid, sodium salt

Identifiers
CAS Number	7789-38-0
3D model (JSmol)	Interactive image
ChEBI	CHEBI:75229
ChemSpider	23009
ECHA InfoCard	100.029.237
EC Number	232-160-4
PubChem CID	23668195
RTECS number	EF8750000
UNII	U54JK6453O
UN number	1494
CompTox Dashboard (EPA)	DTXSID9023837
- InChI: InChI=1S/BrHO3.Na/c2-1(3)4;/h(H,2,3,4);/q;+1/p-1 Key: XUXNAKZDHHEHPC-UHFFFAOYSA-M; InChI=1/BrHO3.Na/c2-1(3)4;/h(H,2,3,4);/q;+1/p-1 Key: XUXNAKZDHHEHPC-REWHXWOFAY
- SMILES: [Na+].[O-]Br(=O)=O

Properties
Chemical formula	NaBrO_{3}
Molar mass	150.891 g·mol^{−1}
Appearance	colorless or white solid
Odor	odorless
Density	3.339 g/cm^{3}
Melting point	381 °C (718 °F; 654 K)
Boiling point	1,390 °C (2,530 °F; 1,660 K)
Solubility in water	27.5 g/100 mL (0 °C); 36.4 g/100 mL (20 °C); 48.8 g/100 mL (40 °C); 90.8 g/100 mL (100 °C)
Solubility	soluble in ammonia insoluble in ethanol
Magnetic susceptibility (χ)	−44.2·10^{−6} cm^{3}/mol
Refractive index (n_{D})	1.594

Structure
Crystal structure	cubic

Thermochemistry
Std molar entropy (S^{⦵}_{298})	130.5 J/mol K
Std enthalpy of formation (Δ_{f}H^{⦵}_{298})	−342.5 kJ/mol
Gibbs free energy (Δ_{f}G^{⦵})	−252.6 kJ/mol

Hazards
- Occupational safety and health (OHS/OSH)
Main hazards	Oxidizing agent
- GHS labelling
Pictograms	(GHS03: Oxidizing) (GHS07: Exclamation mark) (GHS08: Health hazard)
Signal word	Danger
Hazard statements	H271, H272, H302, H315, H319, H335, H341, H350
Precautionary statements	P201, P202, P210, P220, P221, P261, P264, P270, P271, P280, P281, P283, P301+P312, P302+P352, P304+P340, P305+P351+P338, P306+P360, P308+P313, P312, P321, P330, P332+P313, P337+P313, P362, P370+P378, P371+P380+P375, P403+P233, P405, P501
NFPA 704 (fire diamond)	1 0 0 OX
Flash point	381 °C (718 °F; 654 K)
Safety data sheet (SDS)	ICSC 0196

Related compounds
Other anions	Sodium chlorate Sodium iodate
Other cations	Potassium bromate Calcium bromate
Related compounds	Sodium bromide Sodium hypobromite Sodium bromite
- Except where otherwise noted, data are given for materials in their standard state (at 25 °C [77 °F], 100 kPa). verify (what is ?) Infobox references

Sodium bromate, the inorganic compound with the chemical formula of NaBrO_{3}, is the sodium salt of bromic acid. It is a strong oxidant.

== Uses ==
Sodium bromate is mainly used in continuous or batch dyeing processes involving sulfur or vat dyes and as a hair-permagent. In gold mining, it is used in combination with sodium bromide to dissolve gold.

In organic chemistry, sodium bromate is used for a variety of oxidations such as the conversion of alcohols to ketones. Some such oxidations proceed with scission of C-C bonds.

== Production ==
Sodium bromate can be produced from a solution of sodium carbonate and bromine using chlorine gas as the oxidising agent.

6 Na_{2}CO_{3} + Br_{2} + 5 Cl_{2} → 2 NaBrO_{3} + 10 NaCl + 6 CO_{2}

It may also be produced by the electrolytic oxidation of aqueous sodium bromide.

== Human health issues ==
Bromate in drinking water is undesirable because it is a suspected human carcinogen. Its presence in Coca-Cola's Dasani bottled water forced a recall of that product in the UK.
