= Silver sulfate =

- Skeletal formula of silver sulfate

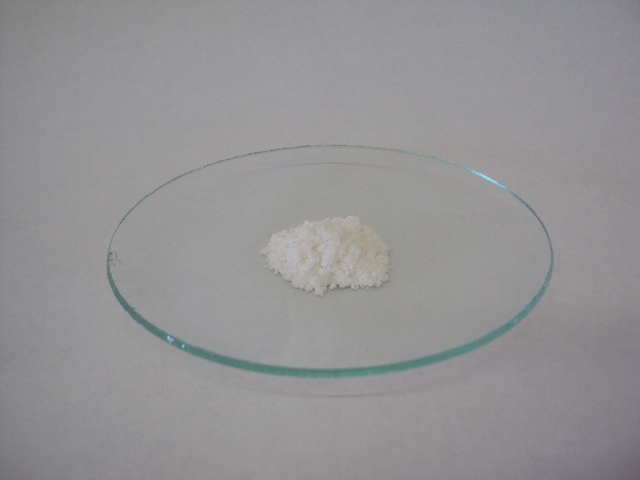
- Sample of silver sulfate

Names
- IUPAC name Silver(I) sulfate
- Other names Disilver sulfate Argentous sulfate

Identifiers
CAS Number	10294-26-5
3D model (JSmol)	Interactive image
ChemSpider	140554
ECHA InfoCard	100.030.581
EC Number	233-653-7
PubChem CID	159865
UNII	8QG6HV4ZPO
UN number	3077
CompTox Dashboard (EPA)	DTXSID70172884
- InChI: InChI=1S/2Ag.H2O4S/c;;1-5(2,3)4/h;;(H2,1,2,3,4)/q2*+1;/p-2 Key: YPNVIBVEFVRZPJ-UHFFFAOYSA-L; InChI=1/2Ag.H2O4S/c;;1-5(2,3)4/h;;(H2,1,2,3,4)/q2*+1;/p-2 Key: YPNVIBVEFVRZPJ-NUQVWONBAA
- SMILES: [Ag+].[Ag+].[O-]S([O-])(=O)=O

Properties
Chemical formula	Ag_{2}SO_{4}
Molar mass	311.79 g·mol^{−1}
Appearance	Colorless solid
Odor	Odorless
Density	5.45 g/cm^{3} (25 °C); 4.84 g/cm^{3} (660 °C)
Melting point	652.2–660 °C (1,206.0–1,220.0 °F; 925.4–933.1 K)
Boiling point	1,085 °C (1,985 °F; 1,358 K) decomposition
Solubility in water	0.57 g/100 mL (0 °C); 0.69 g/100 mL (10 °C); 0.83 g/100 mL (25 °C); 0.96 g/100 mL (40 °C); 1.33 g/100 mL (100 °C)
Solubility product (K_{sp})	1.2·10^{−5}
Solubility	Dissolves in aq. acids, alcohols, acetone, ether, acetates, amides Insoluble in ethanol
Solubility in sulfuric acid	8.4498 g/L (0.1 mol_{H_{2}SO_{4}}/L_{H_{2}O}); 25.44 g/100 g (13 °C); 31.56 g/100 g (24.5 °C); 127.01 g/100 g (96 °C)
Solubility in ethanol	7.109 g/L (0.5 n_{EtOH/H_{2}O})
Solubility in acetic acid	7.857 g/L (0.5 n_{AcOH/H_{2}O})
Magnetic susceptibility (χ)	−9.29·10^{−5} cm^{3}/mol
Refractive index (n_{D})	n_{α} = 1.756 n_{β} = 1.775 n_{γ} = 1.782

Structure
Crystal structure	Orthorhombic, oF56
Space group	Fddd, No. 70
Point group	2/m 2/m 2/m
Lattice constant	a = 10.2699(5) Å, b = 12.7069(7) Å, c = 5.8181(3) Å α = 90°, β = 90°, γ = 90°

Thermochemistry
Heat capacity (C)	131.4 J/mol·K
Std molar entropy (S^{⦵}_{298})	200.4 J/mol·K
Std enthalpy of formation (Δ_{f}H^{⦵}_{298})	−715.9 kJ/mol
Gibbs free energy (Δ_{f}G^{⦵})	−618.4 kJ/mol

Hazards
- GHS labelling
Pictograms	(GHS05: Corrosive) (GHS09: Environmental hazard)
Signal word	Danger
Hazard statements	H318, H410
Precautionary statements	P273, P280, P305+P351+P338, P501
NFPA 704 (fire diamond)	2 0 1
- Except where otherwise noted, data are given for materials in their standard state (at 25 °C [77 °F], 100 kPa). verify (what is ?) Infobox references

Silver sulfate is an inorganic compound with the formula Ag_{2}SO_{4}. It is a white solid with low solubility in water.

== Preparation and structure ==
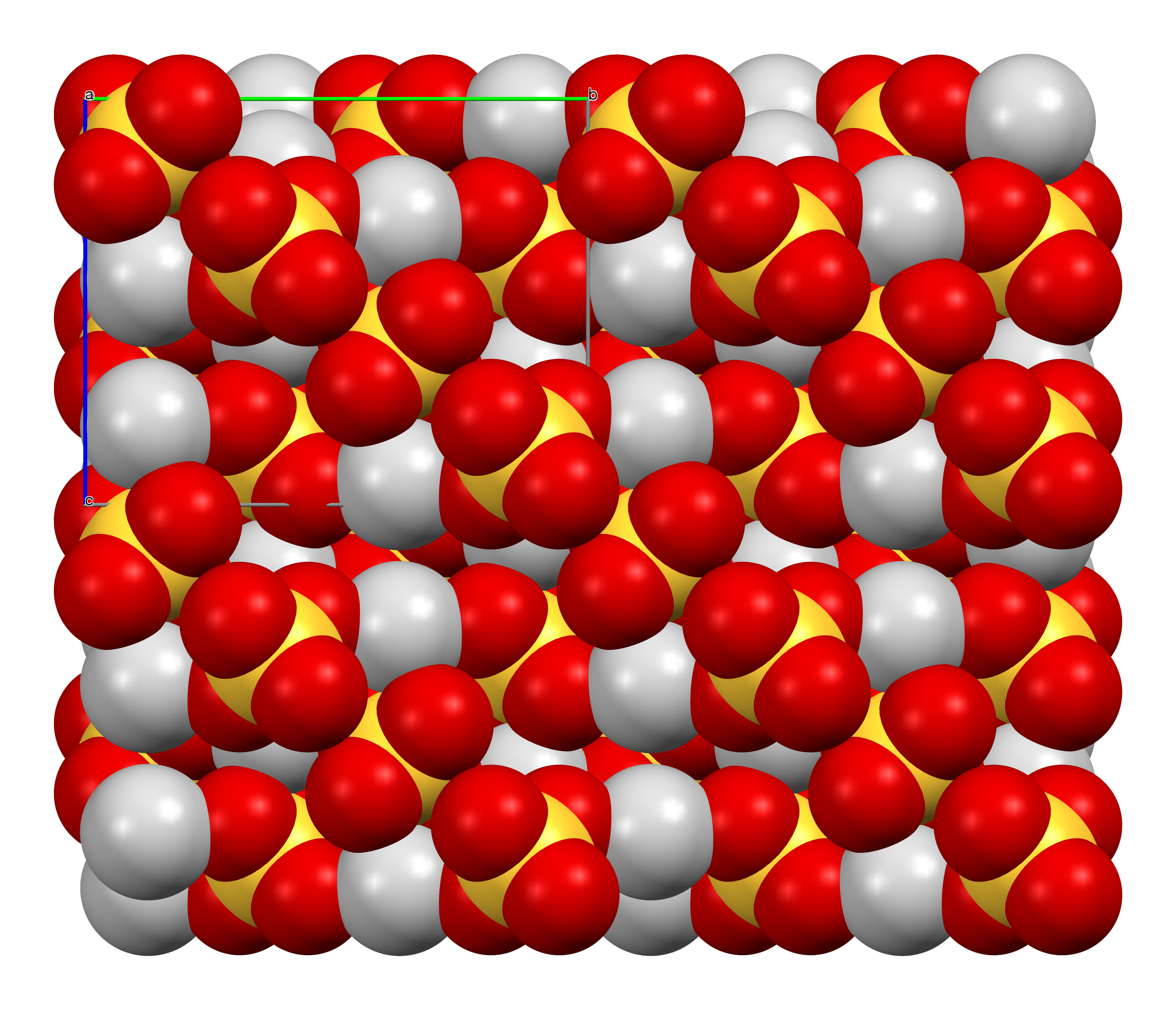
Packing of ions in solid silver sulfate. Color code: red = O, yellow = S, gray = Ag.

Silver sulfate precipitates when an aqueous solution of silver nitrate is treated with sulfuric acid:

2 AgNO_{3} + H_{2}SO_{4} → Ag_{2}SO_{4} + 2 HNO_{3}

It is purified by recrystallization from concentrated sulfuric acid, a step that expels traces of nitrate. Silver sulfate and anhydrous sodium sulfate adopt the same structure.
