= Iodine trichloride =

- Full structural formula of the dimer

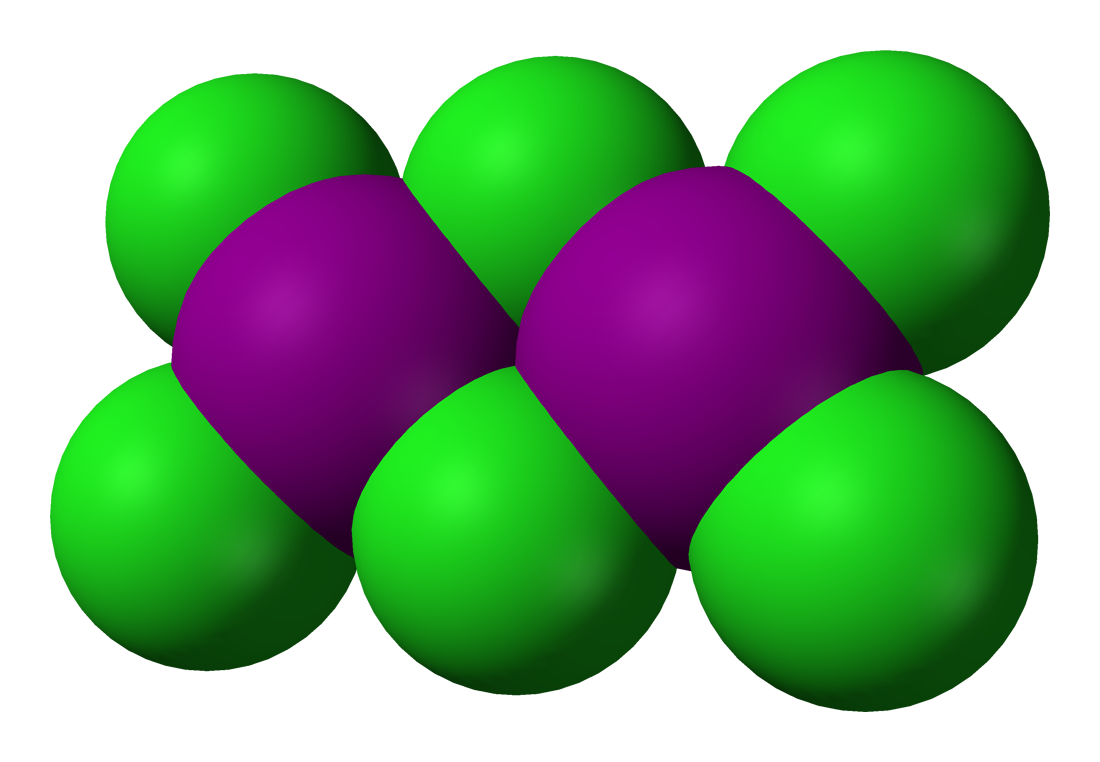
- Space-filling model of the dimer

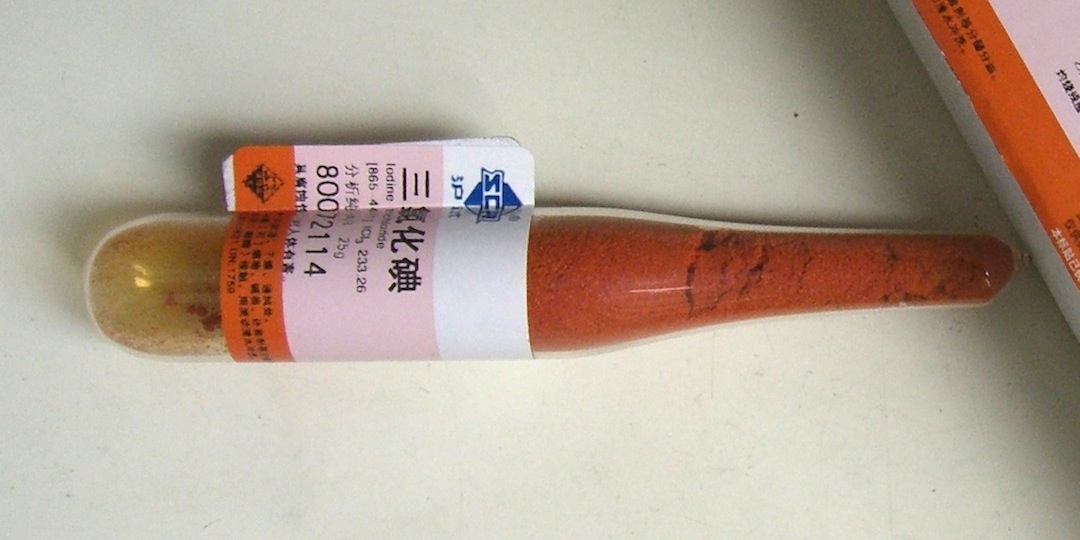
- Commercial sample of iodine trichloride

Names
- IUPAC name Iodine trichloride
- Other names Diiodine hexachloride

Identifiers
CAS Number	865-44-1
3D model (JSmol)	monomer: Interactive image; dimer: Interactive image
ChemSpider	63265
ECHA InfoCard	100.011.582
PubChem CID	70076
UNII	1E5KQ66TRQ
CompTox Dashboard (EPA)	DTXSID3061219
- InChI: InChI=1S/Cl3I/c1-4(2)3 Key: PAWIVBWALDNUJP-UHFFFAOYSA-N; InChI=1/Cl3I/c1-4(2)3 Key: PAWIVBWALDNUJP-UHFFFAOYAF
- SMILES: monomer: ClI(Cl)Cl; dimer: Cl[I-]1(Cl)[Cl+][I-]([Cl+]1)(Cl)Cl

Properties
Chemical formula	I_{2}Cl_{6}
Molar mass	466.5281 g/mol
Appearance	yellow solid
Density	3.11 g/cm^{3}
Melting point	63 °C (145 °F; 336 K)
Magnetic susceptibility (χ)	−90.2×10^{−6} cm^{3}/mol
- Except where otherwise noted, data are given for materials in their standard state (at 25 °C [77 °F], 100 kPa). verify (what is ?) Infobox references

Iodine trichloride is an interhalogen compound of iodine and chlorine. It is bright yellow but with time and upon exposure to light it turns red due to decomposition with formation of elemental iodine. In the solid state is present as a planar dimer I_{2}Cl_{6}, with two bridging Cl atoms.

It can be prepared by reacting iodine with an excess of liquid chlorine at −70 °C, or heating a mixture of liquid iodine and chlorine gas to 105 °C. In the molten state it is conductive, which may indicate disproportionation into ions:

I_{2}Cl_{6} ⇌ ICl^{+}_{2} + ICl^{−}_{4}

It is an oxidizing agent, capable of causing fire on contact with organic materials. That oxidizing power also makes it a useful catalyst for organic chlorination reactions.

Iodine trichloride reacts with concentrated hydrochloric acid, forming tetrachloroiodic acid:

ICl_{3} + HCl → HICl_{4}
