= Silver perchlorate =

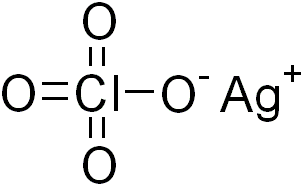

Names
- IUPAC name Silver(I) perchlorate
- Systematic IUPAC name Silver(I) chlorate(VII)
- Other names Perchloric acid, silver(1+) salt Argentous perchlorate

Identifiers
CAS Number	7783-93-9; 14242-05-8 (hydrate)
3D model (JSmol)	Interactive image
ChemSpider	22968
ECHA InfoCard	100.029.123
EC Number	232-035-4
PubChem CID	24562
UNII	SV4X1U113O
CompTox Dashboard (EPA)	DTXSID40884427
- InChI: InChI=1S/Ag.ClHO4/c;2-1(3,4)5/h;(H,2,3,4,5)/q+1;/p-1 Key: YDHABVNRCBNRNZ-UHFFFAOYSA-M; InChI=1/Ag.ClHO4/c;2-1(3,4)5/h;(H,2,3,4,5)/q+1;/p-1 Key: YDHABVNRCBNRNZ-REWHXWOFAI
- SMILES: [Ag+].[O-]Cl(=O)(=O)=O

Properties
Chemical formula	AgClO_{4}
Molar mass	207.319 g/mol
Appearance	Colorless hygroscopic crystals
Density	2.806 g/cm^{3} (monohydrate)
Melting point	486 °C (907 °F; 759 K) (decomposes)
Solubility in water	557 g/100 mL (25 °C); 792.8 g/100 mL (99 °C)
Solubility	soluble in organic solvents

Structure
Crystal structure	cubic

Hazards
- GHS labelling
Pictograms	(GHS03: Oxidizing) (GHS05: Corrosive)
Signal word	Danger
Hazard statements	H272, H314
Precautionary statements	P210, P220, P221, P260, P264, P280, P301+P330+P331, P303+P361+P353, P304+P340, P305+P351+P338, P310, P321, P363, P370+P378, P405, P501
NFPA 704 (fire diamond)	2 0 2 OX
- Except where otherwise noted, data are given for materials in their standard state (at 25 °C [77 °F], 100 kPa). verify (what is ?) Infobox references

Silver perchlorate is the chemical compound with the formula AgClO_{4}. This white solid forms a monohydrate and is mildly deliquescent. It is a useful source of the Ag^{+} ion, although the presence of perchlorate presents risks. It is used as a catalyst in organic chemistry.

== Production ==
Silver perchlorate is created by heating a mixture of perchloric acid with silver nitrate.

Alternatively, it can be prepared by the reaction between barium perchlorate and silver sulfate, or from the reaction of perchloric acid with silver oxide.

== Solubility ==
Silver perchlorate is noteworthy for its solubility in aromatic solvents such as benzene (52.8 g/L) and toluene (1010 g/L). In these solvents, the silver cation binds to the arene, as has been demonstrated by X-ray crystallographic studies on crystals obtained from such solutions. Its solubility in water is extremely high, up to 500 g per 100 mL water. X-ray diffraction experiments show that aqueous solutions contain [Ag(H_{2}O)_{2}]^{+} with Ag-O distances near 240 picometres (2.4 Å).

== Related reagents ==
Similar to silver nitrate, silver perchlorate is an effective reagent for replacing halides ligands with perchlorate, which is a weakly or non-coordinating anion. The use of silver perchlorate in chemical synthesis has declined due to concerns about explosiveness of perchlorate salts. Other silver reagents are silver tetrafluoroborate, and the related silver trifluoromethanesulfonate and silver hexafluorophosphate.
