= Potassium iodate =

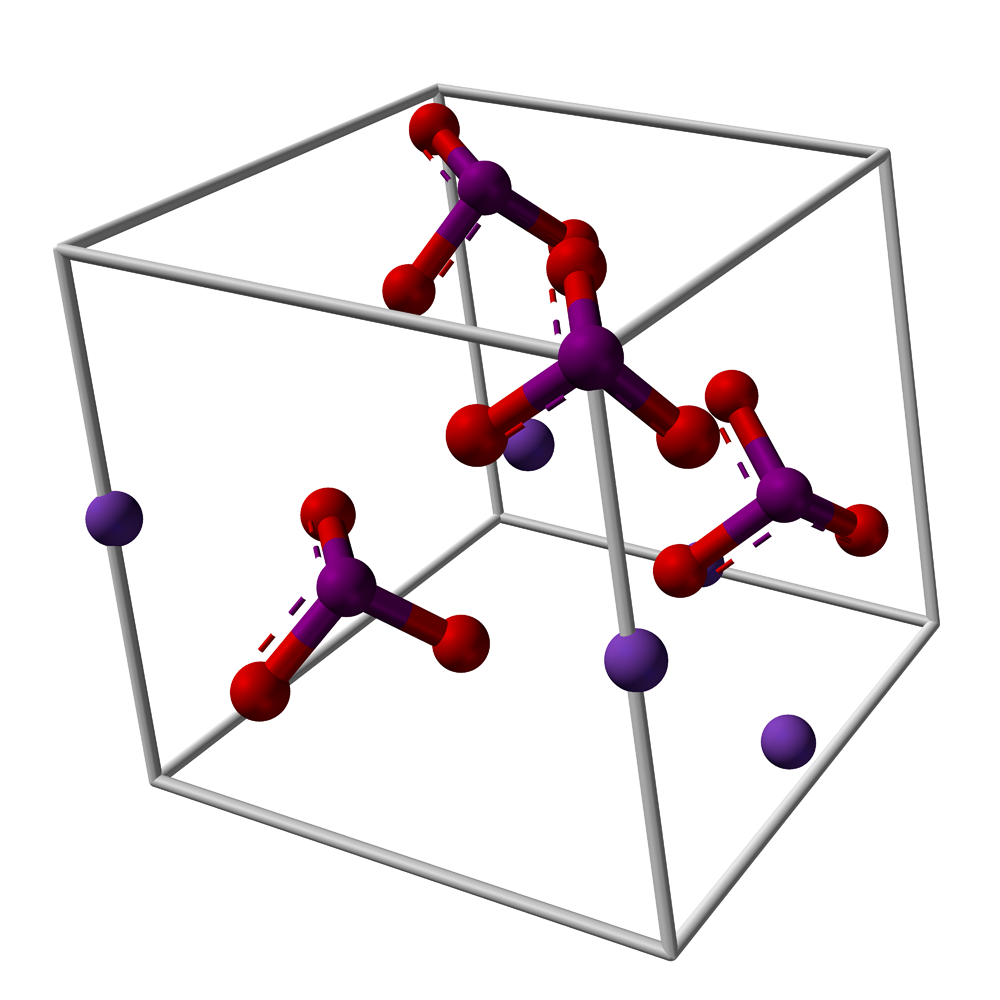

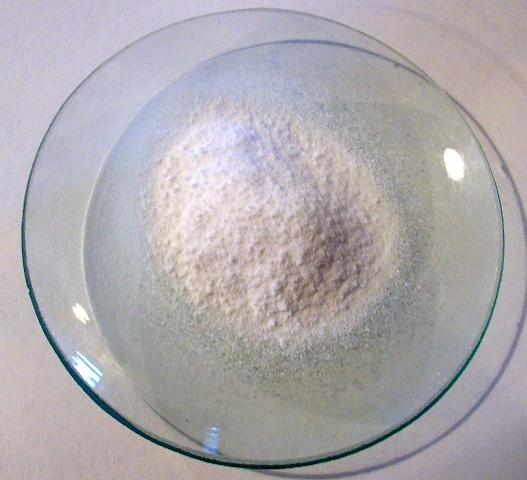

Names
- IUPAC name Potassium iodate
- Other names Iodic acid, potassium salt

Identifiers
CAS Number	7758-05-6
3D model (JSmol)	Interactive image
ChemSpider	22856
DrugBank	DB15923
ECHA InfoCard	100.028.938
EC Number	231-831-9
E number	E917 (glazing agents, ...)
PubChem CID	23665710
RTECS number	NN1350000
UNII	I139E44NHL
UN number	1479
CompTox Dashboard (EPA)	DTXSID5058480
- InChI: InChI=1S/HIO3.K/c2-1(3)4;/h(H,2,3,4);/q;+1/p-1 Key: JLKDVMWYMMLWTI-UHFFFAOYSA-M; InChI=1/HIO3.K/c2-1(3)4;/h(H,2,3,4);/q;+1/p-1 Key: JLKDVMWYMMLWTI-REWHXWOFAL
- SMILES: [K+].[O-]I(=O)=O

Properties
Chemical formula	KIO_{3}
Molar mass	214.000 g·mol^{−1}
Appearance	white monoclinic crystals
Density	3.89 g/cm^{3}
Melting point	560 °C (1,040 °F; 833 K) (decomposes)
Solubility in water	9.16 g/100 mL
Solubility	Soluble in potassium iodide solution
log P	-1
Magnetic susceptibility (χ)	−63.1×10^{−6} cm^{3}/mol

Structure (Phase III (room temp.))
Crystal structure	Triclinic
Space group	P1
Lattice constant	a = 7.744 Å, b = 7.718 Å, c = 7.733 Å α = 108.986°, β = 109.449°, γ = 109.209°
Lattice volume (V)	359.12 Å^{3}
Formula units (Z)	4

Thermochemistry
Heat capacity (C)	106.5 J⋅mol^{−1}·K^{-1}
Std molar entropy (S^{⦵}_{298})	151.5 J⋅mol^{−1}·K^{-1}
Std enthalpy of formation (Δ_{f}H^{⦵}_{298})	−501.4 kJ⋅mol^{−1}
Gibbs free energy (Δ_{f}G^{⦵})	−418.4 kJ⋅mol^{−1}

Hazards
- GHS labelling
Pictograms	(GHS03: Oxidizing) (GHS08: Health hazard) (GHS07: Exclamation mark)
Signal word	Danger
Hazard statements	H272, H302, H319, H361
Precautionary statements	P201, P202, P210, P220, P264, P270, P280, P301+P312+P330, P305+P351+P338, P308+P313, P337+P313, P370+P378, P405, P501
NFPA 704 (fire diamond)	2 0 0 OX
Threshold limit value (TLV)	0.01 mg/m^{3} (as Iodine) (TWA)

Related compounds
Other anions	Potassium chlorate; Potassium bromate
Other cations	Sodium iodate
Related compounds	Potassium iodide; Potassium periodate
- Except where otherwise noted, data are given for materials in their standard state (at 25 °C [77 °F], 100 kPa). verify (what is ?) Infobox references

Potassium iodate (KIO_{3}) is an ionic inorganic compound. It is a white salt that is soluble in water.

== Preparation and properties ==
It can be prepared by reacting a potassium-containing base such as potassium hydroxide (KOH) with iodic acid (HIO_{3}), for example:

HIO_{3} + KOH → KIO_{3} + H_{2}O

It can also be prepared by adding iodine (I_{2}) to a hot, concentrated solution of potassium hydroxide:

3 I_{2} + 6 KOH → KIO_{3} + 5 KI + 3 H_{2}O

Or by fusing potassium iodide with potassium chlorate, bromate or perchlorate, the melt is extracted with water and potassium iodate is isolated from the solution by crystallization:

KI + KClO_{3} → KIO_{3} + KCl

The analogous reaction with potassium hypochlorite is also possible:

KI + 3 KOCl → 3 KCl + KIO_{3}

== Applications ==
Potassium iodate is sometimes used for iodination of table salt to prevent iodine deficiency. In the U.S., iodized salt contains antioxidants, because atmospheric oxygen can oxidize wet iodide to iodine; other countries simply use potassium iodate instead. Salt mixed with ferrous fumarate and potassium iodate, "double fortified salt", are used to address both iron and iodine deficiencies. Potassium iodate is also used to provide iodine in some baby formulas.

Like potassium bromate, potassium iodate is occasionally used as a maturing agent in baking.

=== Radiation protection ===
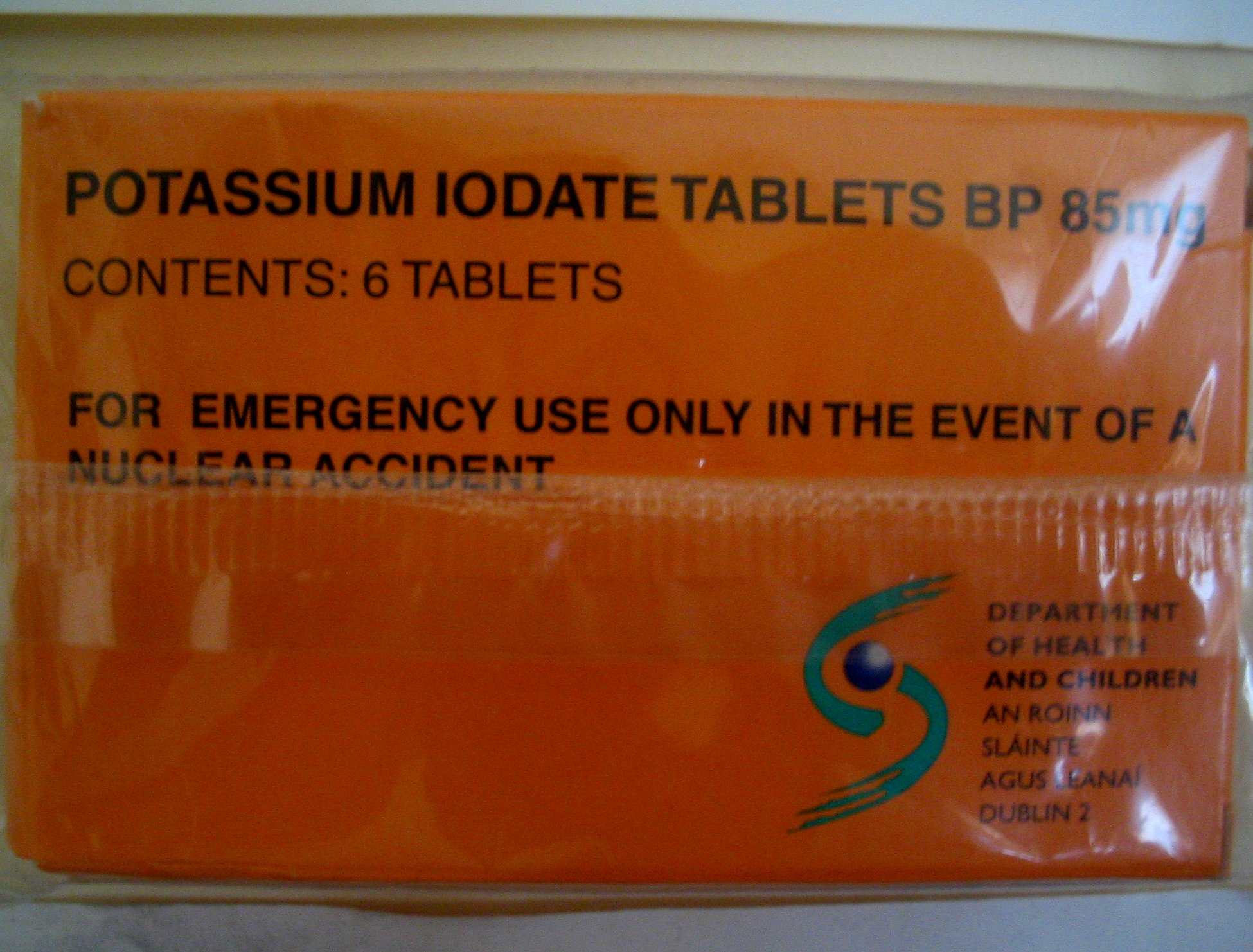
An unopened box of potassium iodate tablets distributed in the early 2000s to Irish households in case of a terror attack on British nuclear facilities

Potassium iodate may be used to protect against accumulation of radioactive iodine in the thyroid by saturating the body with a stable source of iodine prior to exposure.

Approved by the World Health Organization for radiation protection, KIO_{3} is an alternative to potassium iodide, which has poor shelf life in hot and humid climates. The United Kingdom, Singapore, United Arab Emirates, and the U.S. states Idaho and Utah all maintain potassium iodate tablets towards this end.

Following the September 11 attacks, the government of Ireland issued potassium iodate tablets to all households for a similar purpose.

Potassium iodate is not approved by the U.S. Food and Drug Administration (FDA) for use as a thyroid blocker, and the FDA has taken action against U.S. websites that promote this use.

== Safety ==
Potassium iodate is an oxidizing agent and as such it can form explosive mixtures when combined with organic compounds.

Conditions/substances to avoid include: heat, shock, friction, combustible materials, reducing materials, aluminium, organic compounds, carbon, hydrogen peroxide and sulfides.
