= Silver nitrate =

- Structural formula of silver nitrate Structural formula

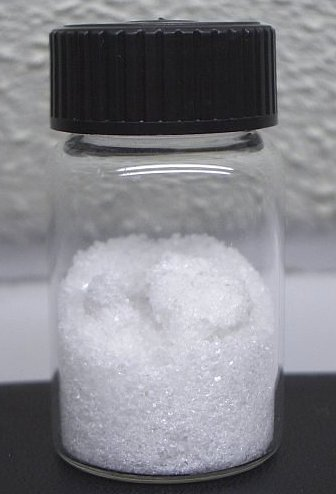
- Sample of silver nitrate

Names
- IUPAC name Silver nitrate
- Systematic IUPAC name Silver(I) nitrate
- Other names Nitric acid silver(1+) salt Lapis infernalis Argentous nitrate

Identifiers
CAS Number	7761-88-8
3D model (JSmol)	Interactive image
ChEBI	CHEBI:32130
ChEMBL	ChEMBL177367
ChemSpider	22878
ECHA InfoCard	100.028.958
EC Number	231-853-9
PubChem CID	24470
RTECS number	VW4725000
UNII	95IT3W8JZE
UN number	1493
CompTox Dashboard (EPA)	DTXSID3032042
- InChI: InChI=1S/Ag.NO3/c;2-1(3)4/q+1;-1 Key: SQGYOTSLMSWVJD-UHFFFAOYSA-N; InChI=1/Ag.NO3/c;2-1(3)4/q+1;-1 Key: SQGYOTSLMSWVJD-UHFFFAOYAW
- SMILES: [N+](=O)([O-])[O-].[Ag+]

Properties
Chemical formula	AgNO_{3}
Molar mass	169.872 g·mol^{−1}
Appearance	colorless crystalline solid
Odor	Odorless
Density	4.35 g/cm^{3} (24 °C); 3.97 g/cm^{3} (210 °C)
Melting point	209.7 °C (409.5 °F; 482.8 K)
Boiling point	440 °C (824 °F; 713 K) decomposes
Solubility in water	122 g/100 mL (0 °C); 170 g/100 mL (10 °C); 256 g/100 mL (25 °C); 373 g/100 mL (40 °C); 912 g/100 mL (100 °C)
Solubility	Soluble in acetone, ammonia, ether, glycerol
Solubility in acetic acid	0.776 g/kg (30 °C); 1.244 g/kg (40 °C); 5.503 g/kg (93 °C)
Solubility in acetone	0.35 g/100 g (14 °C); 0.44 g/100 g (18 °C)
Solubility in benzene	0.22 g/kg (35 °C); 0.44 g/kg (40.5 °C)
Solubility in ethanol	3.1 g/100 g (19 °C)
Solubility in ethyl acetate	2.7 g/100 g (20 °C)
log P	0.19
Magnetic susceptibility (χ)	−45.7·10^{−6} cm^{3}/mol
Refractive index (n_{D})	1.744
Viscosity	3.77 cP (244 °C); 3.04 cP (275 °C)

Structure
Crystal structure	Orthorhombic, oP56
Space group	P2_{1}2_{1}2_{1}, No. 19
Point group	222
Lattice constant	a = 6.992(2) Å, b = 7.335(2) Å, c = 10.125(2) Å α = 90°, β = 90°, γ = 90°

Thermochemistry
Heat capacity (C)	93.1 J/mol·K
Std molar entropy (S^{⦵}_{298})	140.9 J/mol·K
Std enthalpy of formation (Δ_{f}H^{⦵}_{298})	−124.4 kJ/mol
Gibbs free energy (Δ_{f}G^{⦵})	−33.4 kJ/mol

Pharmacology
ATC code	D08AL01 (WHO)

Hazards
- Occupational safety and health (OHS/OSH)
Main hazards	Reacts explosively with ethanol. Toxic. Corrosive.
- GHS labelling
Pictograms	(GHS03: Oxidizing) (GHS05: Corrosive) (GHS09: Environmental hazard)
Signal word	Danger
Hazard statements	H272, H314, H410
Precautionary statements	P220, P273, P280, P305+P351+P338, P310, P501
NFPA 704 (fire diamond)	3 0 2 OX
- Lethal dose or concentration (LD, LC)
LD_{Lo} (lowest published)	800 mg/kg (rabbit, oral); 20 mg/kg (dog, oral)
- Except where otherwise noted, data are given for materials in their standard state (at 25 °C [77 °F], 100 kPa). verify (what is ?) Infobox references

Silver nitrate is an inorganic compound with chemical formula AgNO_{3}. It is a colorless solid that is a precursor to many other silver compounds. Silver nitrate is highly soluble in water but is poorly soluble in most organic solvents, except acetonitrile (111.8 g/100 g, 25 °C). Silver nitrate is the least expensive salt of silver; it offers several other advantages as well. It is non-hygroscopic (in contrast to silver fluoroborate and silver perchlorate). In addition, it is relatively stable to light, and it dissolves in numerous solvents, including water. The nitrate can be easily replaced by other ligands.

== Synthesis ==
Albertus Magnus, in the 13th century, documented the ability of nitric acid to separate gold and silver by dissolving the silver. It was once called lunar caustic because silver was called luna by ancient alchemists who associated silver with the moon. Indeed silver nitrate can be prepared by dissolving silver in nitric acid followed by evaporation of the solution. The stoichiometry of the reaction depends upon the concentration of nitric acid.

3 Ag + 4 HNO_{3} (cold and diluted) → 3 AgNO_{3} + 2 H_{2}O + NO
Ag + 2 HNO_{3} (hot and concentrated) → AgNO_{3} + H_{2}O + NO_{2}

== Structure ==
Solid silver nitrate is a coordination polymer. The structure of silver nitrate has been examined by X-ray crystallography several times. In the common orthorhombic form stable at ordinary temperature and pressure, the silver atoms form pairs with Ag---Ag contacts of 3.227 Å. Each Ag^{+} center is bonded to six oxygen centers of both uni- and bidentate nitrate ligands. The Ag-O distances range from 2.384 to 2.702 Å. Because of range of Ag-O distances the coordination geometry about the Ag^{+} centers is ambiguous. The nitrate groups bridge between four Ag^{+} sites.

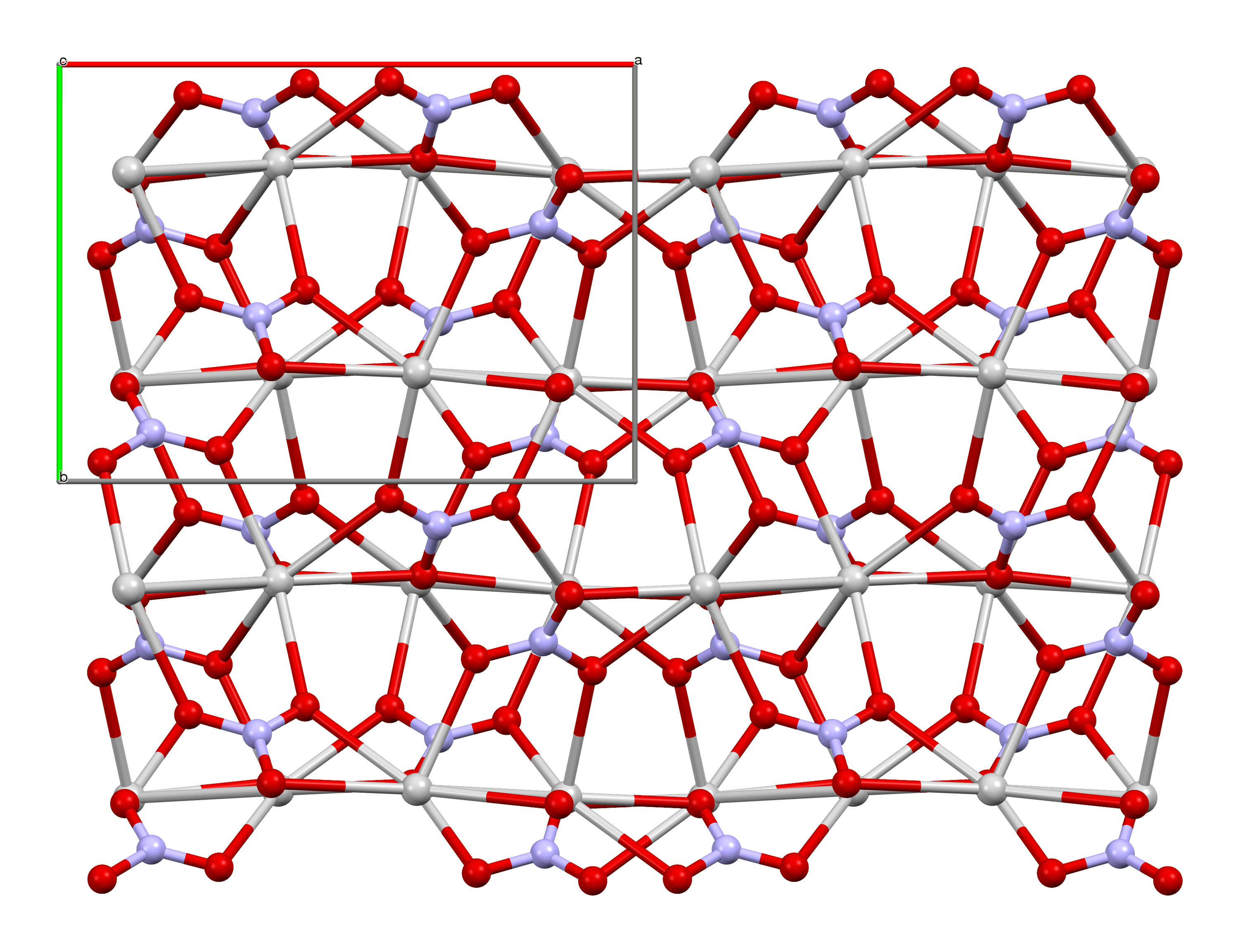
Coordination environment about silver ions in solid silver nitrate

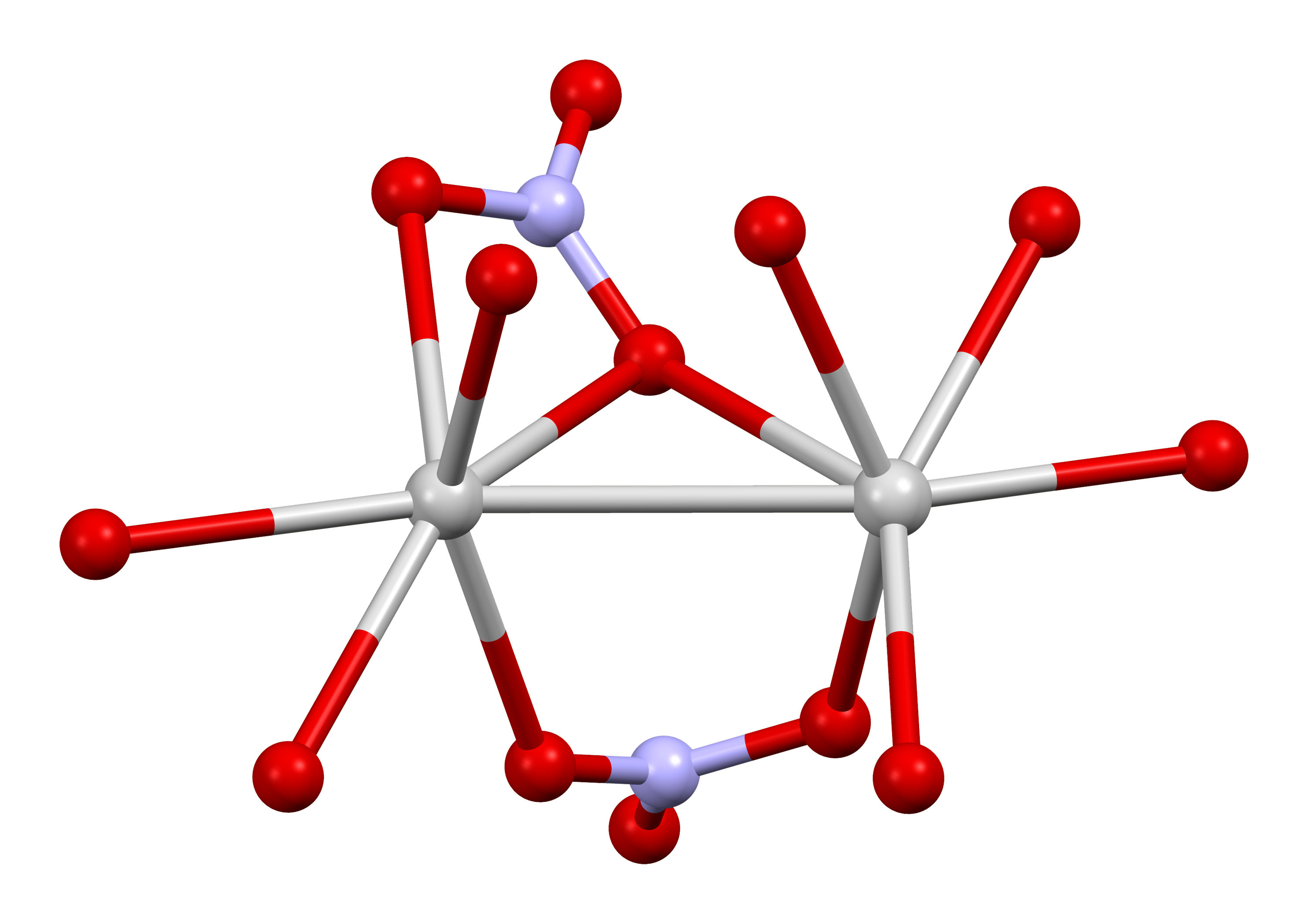
Coordination environment about silver ions in solid silver nitrate

== Reactions ==
=== Thermal properties ===
Solid silver nitrate is robust and melts to give a dense (4.1 g/cm^{3}), stable liquid above its 198 °C melting point. At temperatures around 250 °C it decomposes to release metallic silver and red-brown fumes of nitrogen dioxide. Full decomposition occurs at 440 °C.

2 AgNO_{3} → 2 Ag + O_{2} + 2 NO_{2}

Most metal nitrates thermally decompose to the respective oxides. This may be the case for silver nitrate. Unlike most metal oxides, however, silver oxide readily degrades to the elemental silver.

=== Salt metathesis ===
Silver nitrate is a precursor for the laboratory-scale synthesis of many silver compounds. These include the dark brown oxide, yellow iodide, pale yellow bromide, and white chloride. Among the oxyanion derivatives, the following compounds can be produced by precipitation from aqueous silver nitrate: the white sulfate, white sulfite, pale yellow nitrite, and pale yellow carbonate. When making photographic film, silver nitrate is treated with halide salts of sodium or potassium to form insoluble silver halide in situ in photographic gelatin, which is then applied to strips of tri-acetate or polyester. Similarly, silver nitrate is used to prepare some silver-based explosives, such as the fulminate, azide, or acetylide, through a precipitation reaction.

=== Redox ===
Silver(I) salts are mild oxidants, as implicated by their role in silver-based photography and the staining of skin by silver metal upon contact with silver nitrate solutions. Characteristically, silver nitrate reacts with pieces of copper to form hairlike crystals of silver metal and a blue solution of copper nitrate:

2 AgNO_{3} + Cu → Cu(NO_{3})_{2} + 2 Ag

== Uses ==
=== Halide analysis ===
The silver cation, Ag^{+}, reacts quickly with halide sources to produce the insoluble silver halide. This reaction is used in analytical chemistry to confirm the presence of chloride, bromide, or iodide. The same reaction was used on steamships in order to determine whether or not boiler feedwater had been contaminated with seawater. It is still used to determine moisture on formerly dry cargo as a result of condensation from humid air, or from seawater leaking through the hull.

=== Organic synthesis ===
Silver nitrate finds some use in organic synthesis, e.g. for deprotection and oxidations.

=== Argentation chromatography ===
Ag^{+} binds alkenes reversibly, and silver nitrate has been used to separate mixtures of alkenes by selective absorption. This phenomenon is the basis of argentation chromatography.

In some cases, alkene complexes can be isolated. The alkene can be liberated with ammonia.

=== Biology ===
In histology, silver nitrate is used for silver staining, for demonstrating reticular fibers, proteins and nucleic acids. For this reason it is also used to demonstrate proteins in polyacrylamide gel electrophoresis (PAGE) gels. It can be used as a stain in scanning electron microscopy.

Cut flower stems can be placed in a silver nitrate solution, which prevents the production of ethylene. This delays ageing of the flower.

=== Indelible ink ===
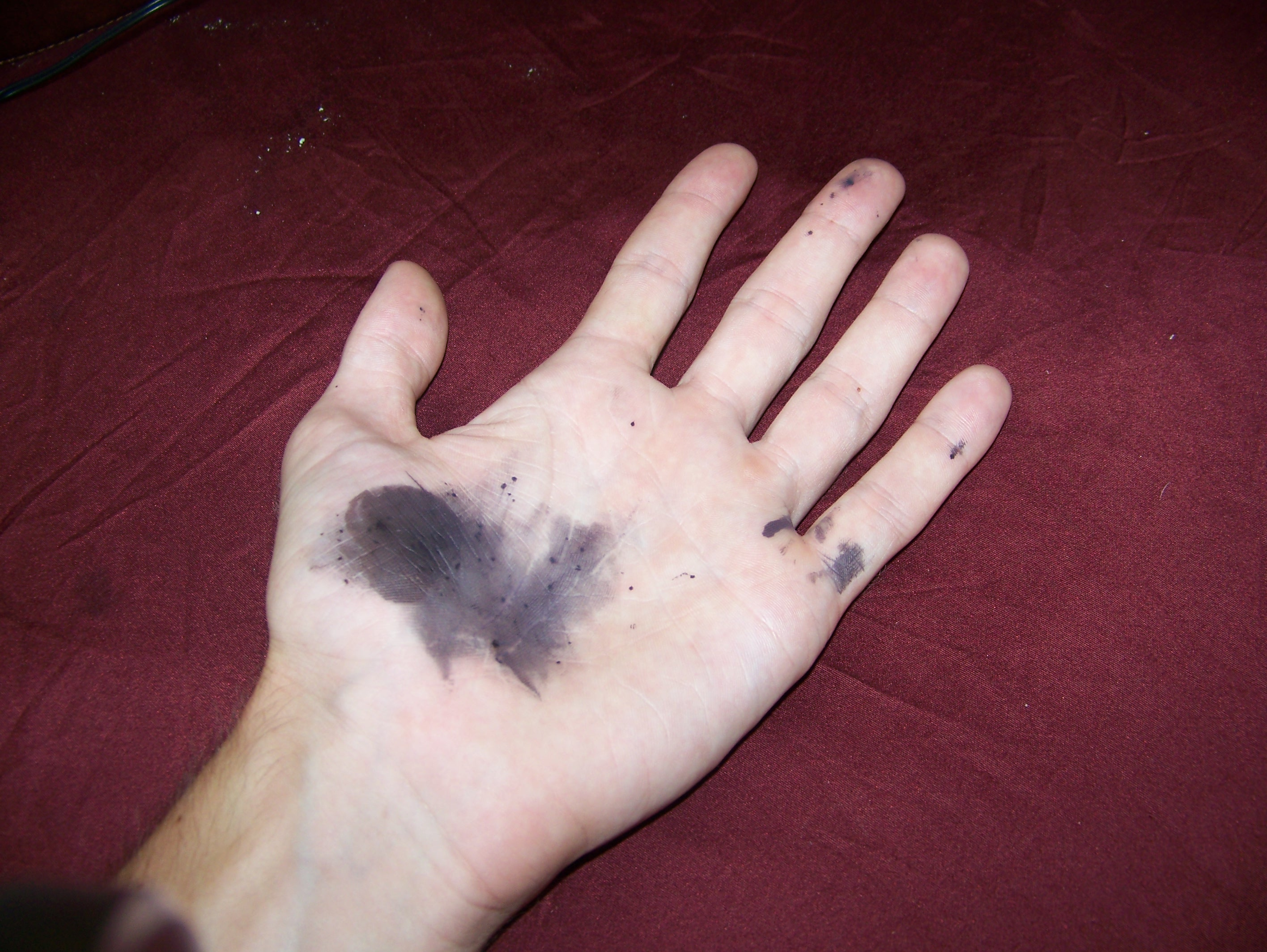
Skin stained by silver from handling silver nitrate

Silver nitrate produces long-lasting stain when applied to skin and is one of indelible ink's ingredients. An electoral stain makes use of this to mark a finger of people who have voted in an election, allowing easy identification to prevent double-voting.

In addition to staining skin, silver nitrate has a history of use in stained glass. In the 14th century, artists began using a "silver stain" (also known as a yellow stain) made from silver nitrate to create a yellow effect on clear glass. The stain would produce a stable color that could range from pale lemon to deep orange or gold. Silver stain was often used with glass paint, and was applied to the opposite side of the glass as the paint. It was also used to create a mosaic effect by reducing the number of pieces of glass in a window. Despite the age of the technique, this process of creating stained glass remains almost entirely unchanged.

== Medicine ==
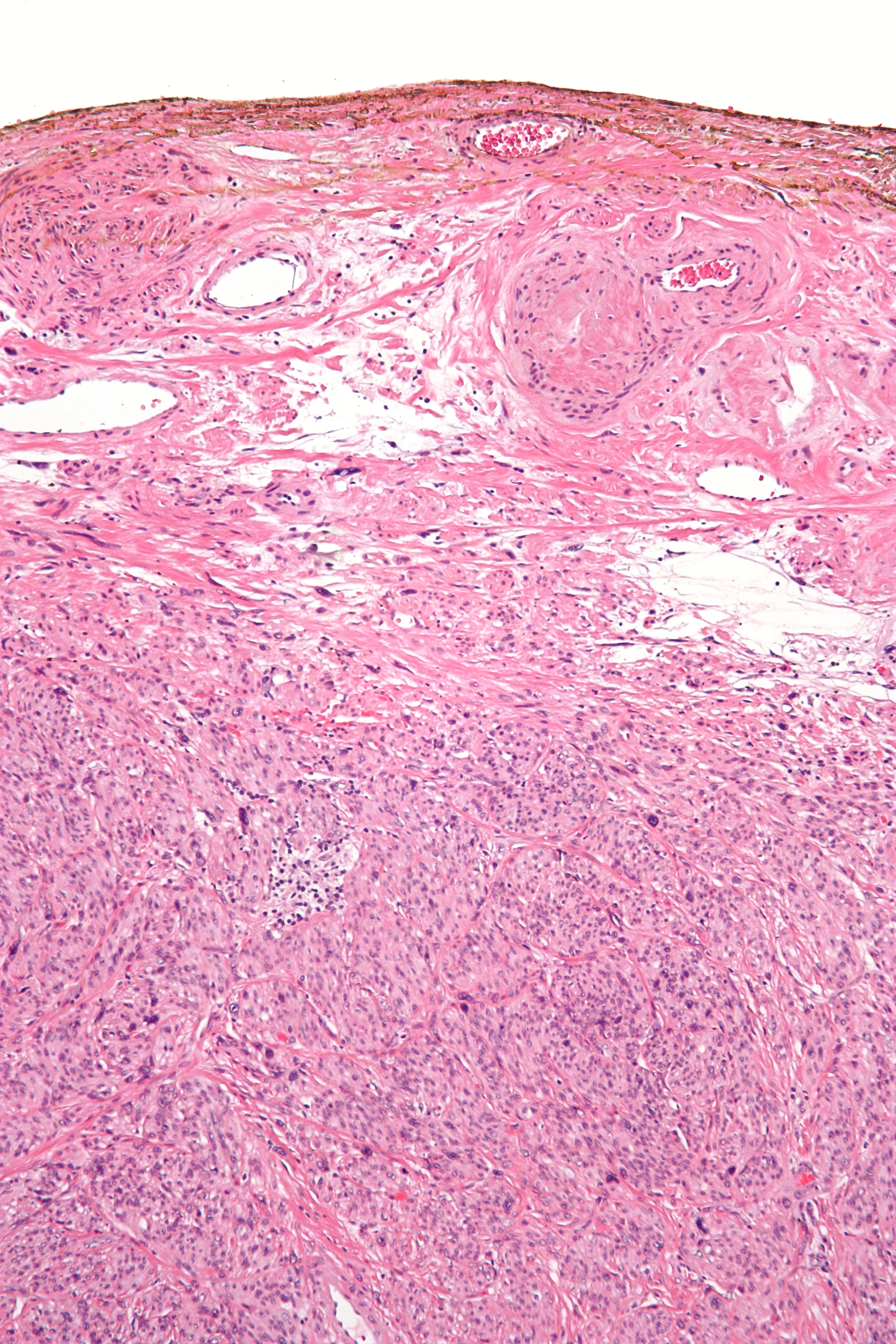
Micrograph showing a silver nitrate (brown) marked surgical margin.

Silver salts have antiseptic properties. In 1881 Credé introduced a method known as Credé's prophylaxis, which used of dilute (2%) solutions of silver nitrate in newborn babies' eyes at birth to prevent contraction of gonorrhea from the mother, which could cause blindness via ophthalmia neonatorum. (Modern antibiotics are now used instead).

Fused silver nitrate, shaped into sticks, was traditionally called "lunar caustic". It is used as a cauterizing agent, for example to remove granulation tissue around a stoma. General Sir James Abbott noted in his journals that in India in 1827 it was infused by a British surgeon into wounds in his arm resulting from the bite of a mad dog to cauterize the wounds and prevent the onset of rabies.

Silver nitrate is used to cauterize superficial blood vessels in the nose to help prevent nosebleeds.

Dentists sometimes use silver nitrate-infused swabs to heal oral ulcers. Silver nitrate is used by some podiatrists to kill cells located in the nail bed.

The Canadian physician C. A. Douglas Ringrose researched the use of silver nitrate for sterilization procedures, believing that silver nitrate could be used to block and corrode the fallopian tubes. The technique was ineffective.

=== Disinfection ===
Much research has been done in evaluating the ability of the silver ion at inactivating Escherichia coli, a microorganism commonly used as an indicator for fecal contamination and as a surrogate for pathogens in drinking water treatment. Concentrations of silver nitrate evaluated in inactivation experiments range from 10–200 micrograms per liter as Ag^{+}. Silver's antimicrobial activity saw many applications prior to the discovery of modern antibiotics, when it fell into near disuse. Its association with argyria made consumers wary and led them to turn away from it when given an alternative.

=== Against warts ===
Repeated daily application of silver nitrate can induce adequate destruction of cutaneous warts, but occasionally pigmented scars may develop. In a placebo-controlled study of 70 patients, silver nitrate given over nine days resulted in clearance of all warts in 43% and improvement in warts in 26% one month after treatment compared to 11% and 14%, respectively, in the placebo group.

== Safety ==
As an oxidant, silver nitrate should be properly stored away from organic compounds. It reacts explosively with ethanol. Despite its common usage in extremely low concentrations to prevent gonorrhea and control nosebleeds, silver nitrate is still very toxic and corrosive. Brief exposure will not produce any immediate side effects other than the purple, brown or black stains on the skin, but upon constant exposure to high concentrations, side effects will be noticeable, which include burns. Long-term exposure may cause eye damage. Silver nitrate is known to be a skin and eye irritant. Silver nitrate has not been thoroughly investigated for potential carcinogenic effect.
