= SolidOx =

SolidOx was the brand name for welding equipment produced by Cleanweld Products for do-it-yourself welding enthusiasts from 1965 until at least the early 1980s; the SOLIDOX name was registered as a trademark in 1968.

SolidOx commonly refers to SolidOx Pellets or SolidOx Sticks used to supply the oxygen for the welding equipment. The SolidOx Pellets were made of sodium chlorate and were burned to produce oxygen.

SolidOx products are no longer produced. They apparently continued production until at least 1983. In 1984, Cleanweld Products (or at least a portion of the company) was sold to Cooper Industries to be part of their tool division, including the SolidOx product line.

== See also ==
- Oxygen storage
- Chemical oxygen generator
