= SFOG =

SFOG may refer to:

- Six Flags Over Georgia
- Swedish association of obstetrics and gynecology
- Solid-fuel oxygen generator
