= SCSR =

SCSR may refer to:

- Self-contained self-rescue device, a portable oxygen source
- Single-channel signaling rate, a type of data signaling rate
