= Chemical oxygen generator =

Device that releases oxygen via a chemical reaction

A chemical oxygen generator is a device that releases oxygen via a chemical reaction. The oxygen source is usually an inorganic superoxide, chlorate, or perchlorate. The generators are usually ignited by a firing pin, and the chemical reaction is usually exothermic, making the generator a potential fire hazard. Potassium superoxide was used as an oxygen source on early crewed missions of the Soviet space program, in submarines for use in emergency situations, for firefighters, and for mine rescue.

== In commercial airliners ==
Diagram of a chemical oxygen generator system

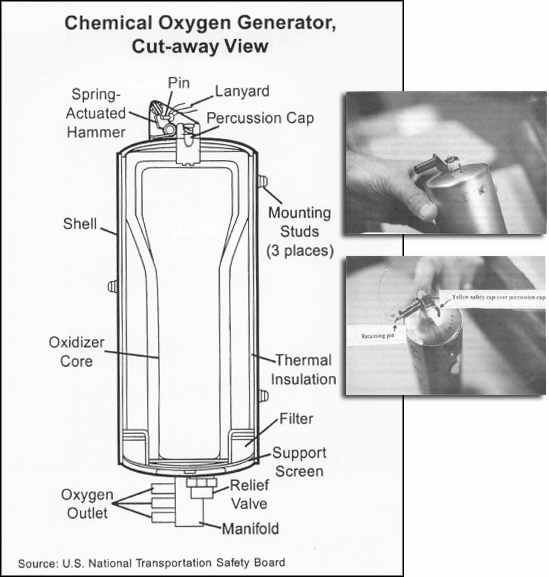
Chemical Oxygen Generator, Cut-away View

Commercial aircraft provide emergency oxygen to passengers to protect them in case of loss of cabin pressure. Chemical oxygen generators are not used for the cockpit crew, who are typically supplied using compressed oxygen cylinders, also known as oxygen bottles. In narrow body airliners, overhead oxygen masks and oxygen generators are provided for each row of seats. In some wide-body airliners, such as the DC-10 and IL-96, oxygen generators and oxygen masks are mounted in the top portion of the seat backs, due to the increased ceiling height. If a decompression occurs, access panels are opened either by an automatic pressure switch or by a manual switch, and the masks are released. When passengers pull down on the mask, they remove the retaining pins and trigger the production of oxygen.

The oxidizer core is sodium chlorate (NaClO_{3}), which is mixed with less than 5 percent barium peroxide (BaO_{2}) and less than 1 percent potassium perchlorate (KClO_{4}). The explosives in the percussion cap are a lead styphnate and tetrazene explosive mixture. The chemical reaction is exothermic and the exterior temperature of the generator will reach 260 °C (500 °F). It will produce oxygen for a minimum of 15 minutes. A two-mask generator is approximately 63 mm (2.5 in) in diameter and 223 mm (8.8 in) long. A three-mask generator is approximately 70 mm (2.8 in) in diameter and 250 mm (9.8 in) long.

The improper treatment of generators has already contributed to several aviation accidents. On May 11, 1996, accidental activation of improperly shipped expired generators, which were mistakenly labeled as "empty canisters", caused ValuJet Flight 592 to catch on fire in flight. The massive fire made the aircraft lose control and crash, killing all 110 people on board. On August 10, 1986, an ATA DC-10, Flight 131, was destroyed while parked at O'Hare International Airport. The cause was the accidental activation of an oxygen generator, contained in the back of a broken DC-10 seat, being shipped in the cargo compartment to a repair station. There were no fatalities or injuries as the plane contained no passengers when the fire broke out.

== Oxygen candle ==
A chlorate candle, or an oxygen candle, is a cylindrical chemical oxygen generator that contains a mix of sodium chlorate and iron powder, which when ignited smolders at about 600 °C (1,100 °F), producing sodium chloride, iron oxide, and oxygen at a fixed rate of about 6.5 man-hours per kilogram of the mixture. The mixture has an indefinite shelf life if stored properly: candles have been stored for 20 years without decreased oxygen output. Thermal decomposition releases the oxygen. The burning iron supplies the heat. The candle must be wrapped in thermal insulation to maintain the reaction temperature and to protect surrounding equipment. The key reaction is:

2 NaClO_{3} → 2 NaCl + 3 O_{2}

Potassium and lithium chlorate, and sodium, potassium and lithium perchlorates can also be used in oxygen candles.

In the Vika oxygen generator used on some spacecraft, lithium perchlorate is the source of oxygen. At 400 °C (750 °F), it releases 60% of its mass as oxygen:

LiClO_{4} → LiCl + 2 O_{2}

== Pressure swing adsorption (PSA) oxygen generators ==
Advances in technology have provided industrial oxygen generator systems for use where air is available and a higher concentration of oxygen is desired. Pressure swing adsorption (PSA) incorporates a molecular sieve for gas separation. In the case of oxygen generation a zeolite-based sieve forces preferential adsorption for nitrogen. Clean, dry air is passed through the sieve beds on the oxygen generator, producing an oxygen-enriched gas. Nitrogen separation membrane equipment is also used.

== Uses ==
Chemical oxygen generators are used in aircraft, breathing apparatus for firefighters and mine rescue crews, submarines, and everywhere a compact emergency oxygen generator with long shelf life is needed. They usually contain a device for absorption of carbon dioxide, sometimes a filter filled with lithium hydroxide; a kilogram of LiOH absorbs about half a kilogram of CO_{2}.

- Self-contained oxygen generators (SCOGs) are used in submarines.
  - They were successfully used by the USS New Hampshire, an American nuclear-powered submarine, in March 2011 when the submarine suffered an oxygen generator failure while under the Arctic ice cap.
  - An explosion caused by a so-called oxygen candle killed two Royal Navy sailors on HMS Tireless (S88), a nuclear-powered submarine, under the Arctic on 21 March 2007. The candle had likely become contaminated with hydraulic oil, which would have caused the mixture to explode rather than burn.
- Self-contained self-rescue devices (SCSRs) are used to facilitate escape from mines.
- On the International Space Station, chemical oxygen generators are used as a backup supply. Each Vika oxygen generator can produce enough oxygen for one crewmember for one day.

== See also ==
- Oxygen storage
- SolidOx (welding)
