= Hopcalite =

Catalyst to oxidise carbon monoxide at room temperature

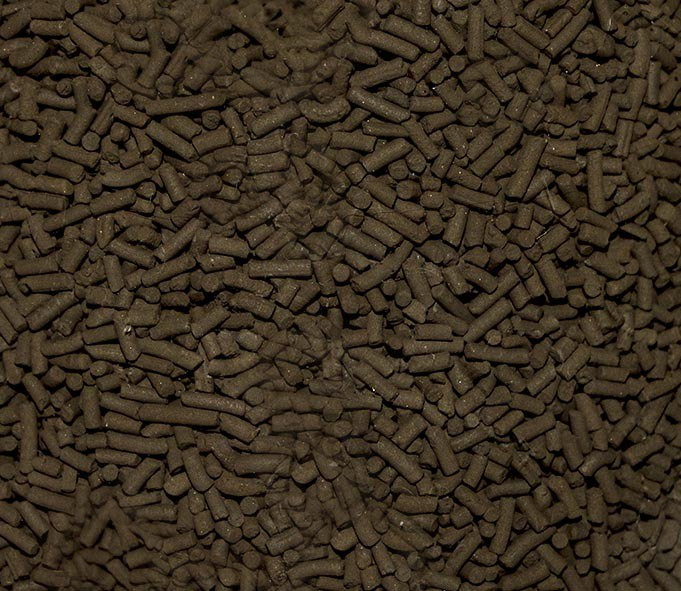
Hopcalite

Hopcalite is the trade name for a number of mixtures that mainly consist of oxides of copper and manganese, which are used as catalysts for the conversion of carbon monoxide to carbon dioxide when exposed to the oxygen in the air at room temperature.

The name "hopcalite" is derived from Johns Hopkins University - "Hop" and the University of California - "Cal", where basic research into carbon monoxide was carried out during the First World War and these catalysts were discovered in 1918.

A variety of compositions are known, such as "hopcalite II" that is approximately 60% manganese dioxide and 40% copper oxide (the MnO_{2} : CuO molar ratio is 1.375) and "hopcalite I" that is a mixture of 50% MnO, 30% CuO, 15% Co_{2}O_{3}, and 5% Ag_{2}O. Hopcalite has the properties of a porous mass and resembles activated carbon in its appearance.

== Preparation ==
While typically hopcalite catalysts are prepared by calcining intimate mixtures of oxides and carbonates, various techniques have been employed for producing hopcalites in the laboratory and on an industrial scale, such as physical mixing of the (finely divided) metal oxides, co-precipitation of the metal oxides from metal salt solutions (see salts), thermal decomposition of mixtures of metal nitrates (see nitrate) and metal carbonates (see carbonate), one-step synthesis via flame spray pyrolysis from organic and inorganic precursor systems, e.g. Nanophase hopcalite catalysts have also been described.

Although hopcalite-based catalysts have been used in practice for decades, many questions regarding their mode of action are still open. This is due to their complex structures, which make it difficult to obtain information about the active centers and the mechanisms of catalysis and deactivation.

== Applications ==
Hopcalite is widely used in personal respiratory protective equipment (RPE) and collective protective equipment, among others. Different uses of hopcalite catalysts are listed below:

- in some types of gas mask filters designed to protect from carbon monoxide (Soviet-made DP-1, combined filters VK-450, SX (CO) filters, e.g.)
- in air filtration systems and breathing apparatus to purify breathing air supplies, for example those utilised in scuba diving, and firefighting.
- used as the main filtration ingredient in the self rescue respirators issued to miners (SPP-4)
- filtering self-rescuers designed for use in fire conditions (GDZK-EN, GDZK-U, GDZK-A, e.g.)
- in devices for monitoring the content of carbon monoxide (CO) in rooms
- used as a precaution with submersible air compressors, if they are driven by internal combustion engines (like on ships)

In respiratory protective equipment, hopcalite is used to facilitate the rapid oxidation of the toxic carbon monoxide to harmless carbon dioxide with the oxygen from the air, which is then chemically bound to a sodium hydroxide layer, thus eliminating CO from the air stream, (which otherwise is not removed by activated charcoal air filters). Water vapor poisons the hopcalite catalyst, so a silica-based filter is introduced beforehand to prevent this. In addition to that, the hopcalite layer is protected by a mechanical filter and a layer of activated carbon, purify the air of other contaminants. The operation of carbon monoxide (CO) detectors, on the other hand, is based on recording the heat released during the catalytic oxidation of carbon monoxide (CO) to carbon dioxide (CO_{2}).

Although primarily used to catalyze the conversion of CO to CO_{2}, hopcalite catalysts are also used to remove ethylene oxide and other VOCs as well as ozone from gas streams. In addition, hopcalites catalyze the oxidation of various organic compounds at elevated temperatures (200–500 °C).

== See also ==
- Gas mask
- Rebreather
- Self-contained self-rescue device
- Carbon monoxide detector
- Catalysis
- heterogeneous catalysis
- Carbon monoxide poisoning
