= Oxygen storage =

Methods of oxygen storage for subsequent use span many approaches, including high pressures in oxygen tanks, cryogenics, oxygen-rich compounds and reaction mixtures, and chemical compounds that reversibly release oxygen upon heating or pressure change. O_{2} is the second most important industrial gas.

== Air ==
Air is the most common source and reservoir of oxygen, containing 20.8% oxygen. This concentration is sufficient for many purposes, such as combustion of many fuels, corrosion of many metals, and breathing of animals. Most humans can function at rest with an oxygen level of 15% at one atmosphere pressure; a fuel such as methane is combustable down to 12% oxygen in nitrogen.

A small room of 10 meter^{3} has 2.08 meter^{3} (2080 liters) or 2.99 kg of oxygen which would occupy 2.62 liters if it was liquid.

== High pressure ==
Oxygen tanks containing pressures of up to 200 bar (3000 psi) are used for industrial processes including the manufacturing of steel and monel, welding and cutting, medical breathing gas, diving and as an emergency breathing gas in aircraft. A small steel tank of 16 litres water capacity with a working pressure of 139 bar (2015 psi), holds about 2150 litres of gas and weighs 28 kilograms (62 lb). 2150 litres of oxygen, without the steel tank, weighs about 3 kilograms (6.6 lb).

== Cryogenic ==
Liquid oxygen in a cryogenic storage dewar (vacuum-insulated flask) is used in aerospace, submarine and gas industries.

== Chemical oxygen generators ==
Chemical oxygen generators store oxygen in their chemical composition, and can be used only one time.

Oxygen Candles contain a mix of sodium chlorate and iron powder, which when ignited smolders at about 600 °C (1,112 °F) and results in sodium chloride, iron oxide, and oxygen, about 270 liters per kg of mixture.

Some commercial airliners use emergency oxygen generators containing a mixture of sodium chlorate (NaClO_{3}), 5 percent barium peroxide (BaO_{2}) and 1 percent potassium perchlorate (KClO_{4}), which after ignition, reacts releasing oxygen for 12 to 22 minutes while the unit reaches 500 °F (260 °C).

The Vika oxygen generating system, used on Mir and later the International Space Station under the NASA designation Solid Fuel Oxygen Generator (SFOG) is based on lithium perchlorate, which releases about 60% of its weight in oxygen. Of all the perchlorates, lithium perchlorate has both the highest oxygen to weight and oxygen to volume ratio, except beryllium diperchlorate which is expensive and toxic. The Vika system uses a canister containing about 1 liter (2.4 kg) of perchlorate to generate 600 liters (0.86 kg) of oxygen, enough for one person for one day.

Chemical oxygen generators containing potassium superoxide were used on the Soyuz spacecraft and in some mine safety Self-Contained Self-Rescue (SCSR) devices; KO_{2} reacts with both H_{2}O and CO_{2} to produce oxygen, and 0.38 kg of oxygen is generated per kg of superoxide.

Tetramethylammonium ozonide ((CH_{3})_{4}NO_{3}) is proposed as a source of oxygen for generators because of its low molecular weight, being 39% oxygen.

== Reversible chemical absorbers ==
Absorption and desorption of the oxygen can be controlled using pressure change, so-called Pressure Swing Absorption (PSA) or temperature change, so-called Temperature Swing Absorption (TSA).

Cation ordered double perovskites BaLnMn_{2}O_{5+d} (Ln: Lanthanides and Y) are known oxygen storage materials working in PSA mode. The materials show practically complete and reversible change between fully reduced BaLnMn_{2}O_{5} and oxidized BaLnMn_{2}O_{6}, which occurs at moderate temperatures (300–500 °C) during changes of the oxygen partial pressure. The properties of the particular material depends on the substituted Ln^{+}_{3} cation. In this type of material, oxygen intercalation occurs into vacancies and is correlated with a change of the oxidation state of the manganese (redox reaction).

Another materials suitable for PSA operation are brownmillerite-type materials such as La_{0.6}Sr_{0.4}Co_{0.2}Fe_{0.8}O_{3−d}, La_{0.5}Sr_{0.5}Co_{0.5}Fe_{0.5}O_{3−d}, commonly used as cathode materials for SOFC exhibit some good oxygen storage properties such as high capacity and low oxidation temperature. However, cobalt-rich materials may suffer from instability in reducing conditions and higher temperatures such as 550 °C.

Recently developed materials suitable for TSA applications are hexagonal LnMnO_{3+d} (Ln: Lanthanides and Y) materials. Oxygen stoichiometric phases (δ = 0), denoted as Hex0, crystallize in the hexagonal P6_{3}cm symmetry which can be described as a layered structure in which layers of R^{+}_{3} cations in eight-fold coordination are separated by layers of corner-sharing trigonal Mn^{+}_{3}O_{5} bipyramids. A very important property, from the viewpoint of TSA, is the possibility of the introduction of a significant amount of interstitial oxygen into the structure near the Mn site, which increases the Mn valence to above +3. This process leads to creation of a unique, maximally eightfold coordination of the manganese cations and changes the symmetry of the primitive cell. Introduction of interstitial oxygen into the structure results in the formation of oxygen-loaded phases having different symmetries: R3c (δ ≈ 0.28, Hex1) and Pca2_{1} (δ ≈ 0.41, Hex2). The operating temperature range of those type of materials in an air atmosphere, could be as low as 200-300 ˚C and as narrow as 20 ˚C.

Scientists at the University of Southern Denmark published a paper on oxygen storage by chemisorption. Two molecules of dioxygen are stored into a crystalline salt {(bpbp)Co^{II}_{2}NO_{3}}_{2}(2-amino-1,4-benzenedicarboxylato)(NO_{3})_{2}·2H_{2}O. at 35 Celsius, and released by heating to 100 Celsius. "Bpbp" is 2,6-bis(N,N-bis(2-pyridylmethyl)aminomethyl)-4-tert-butylphenolato.

An analogy of the function of cobalt bound to their organic molecule was made to the function of iron and copper in metalloproteins used for respiration by animals. The nitrate anions in the crystal are exchanged with neutral dioxygen but remain in the crystal; other anions besides nitrate work similarly and exchange oxygen faster. 10 liters of crystals are "enough to suck up all the oxygen in a room", three times more oxygen than an equivalent sized steel tank.

== See also ==
- Cryogenic oxygen plant
