= Oxygen =

Oxygen, _{8}O
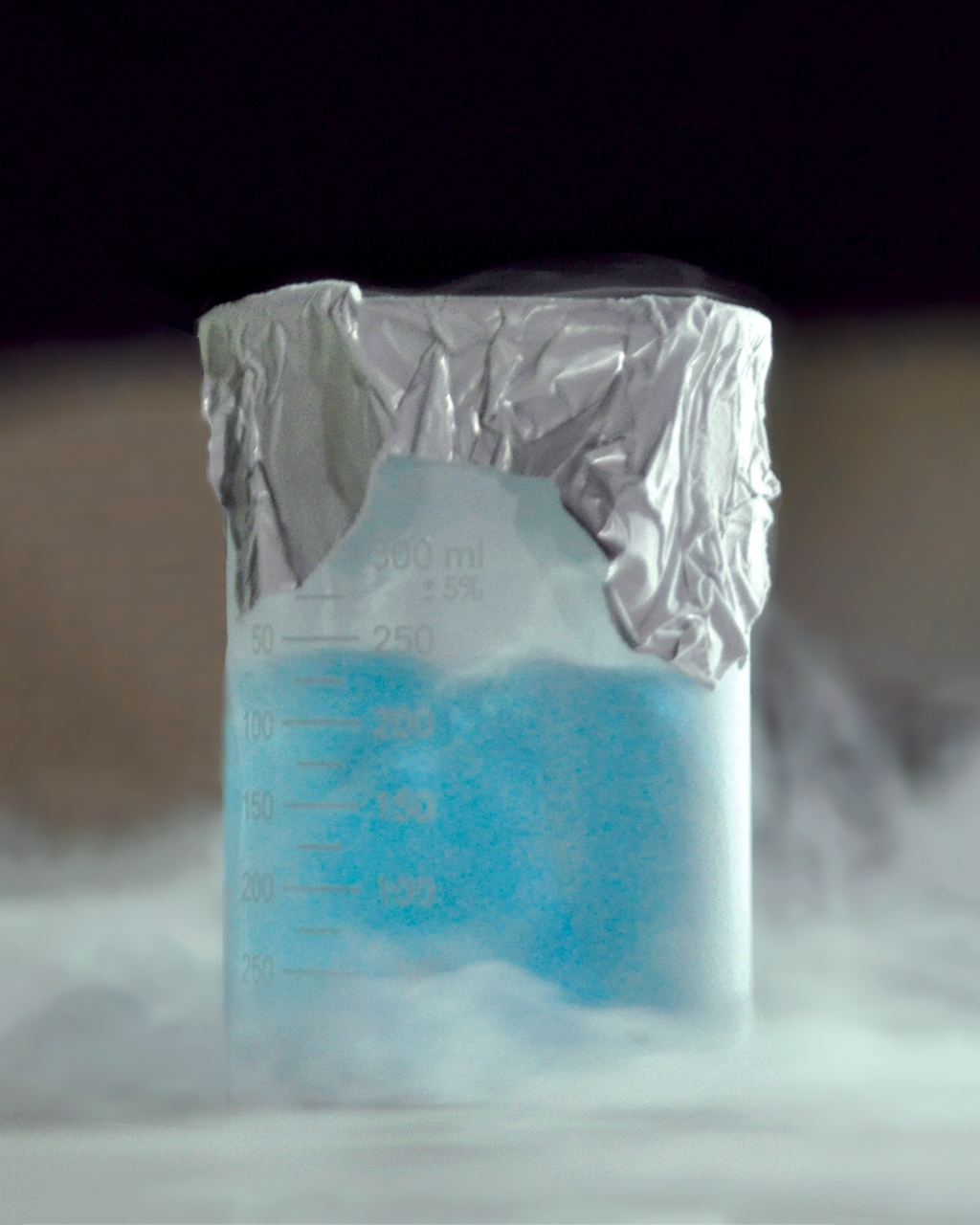
- Liquid oxygen (O_{2} at below −183 °C)

Oxygen
- Allotropes: O_{2}, O_{3} (ozone) and more (see Allotropes of oxygen)
- Appearance: gas: colorless liquid and solid: pale blue

Standard atomic weight A_{r}°(O)
- [15.99903, 15.99977]; 15.999±0.001 (abridged)

Oxygen in the periodic table
Hydrogen																															Helium
Lithium	Beryllium																									Boron	Carbon	Nitrogen	Oxygen	Fluorine	Neon
Sodium	Magnesium																									Aluminium	Silicon	Phosphorus	Sulfur	Chlorine	Argon
Potassium	Calcium															Scandium	Titanium	Vanadium	Chromium	Manganese	Iron	Cobalt	Nickel	Copper	Zinc	Gallium	Germanium	Arsenic	Selenium	Bromine	Krypton
Rubidium	Strontium															Yttrium	Zirconium	Niobium	Molybdenum	Technetium	Ruthenium	Rhodium	Palladium	Silver	Cadmium	Indium	Tin	Antimony	Tellurium	Iodine	Xenon
Caesium	Barium	Lanthanum	Cerium	Praseodymium	Neodymium	Promethium	Samarium	Europium	Gadolinium	Terbium	Dysprosium	Holmium	Erbium	Thulium	Ytterbium	Lutetium	Hafnium	Tantalum	Tungsten	Rhenium	Osmium	Iridium	Platinum	Gold	Mercury (element)	Thallium	Lead	Bismuth	Polonium	Astatine	Radon
Francium	Radium	Actinium	Thorium	Protactinium	Uranium	Neptunium	Plutonium	Americium	Curium	Berkelium	Californium	Einsteinium	Fermium	Mendelevium	Nobelium	Lawrencium	Rutherfordium	Dubnium	Seaborgium	Bohrium	Hassium	Meitnerium	Darmstadtium	Roentgenium	Copernicium	Nihonium	Flerovium	Moscovium	Livermorium	Tennessine	Oganesson
–
↑
O
↓
S
nitrogen ← oxygen → fluorine
- Atomic number (Z): 8
- Group: group 16 (chalcogens)
- Period: period 2
- Block: p-block
- Electron configuration: [He] 2s^{2} 2p^{4}
- Electrons per shell: 2, 6

Physical properties
- Phase at STP: gas
- Melting point: (O_{2}) 54.36 K (−218.79 °C, −361.82 °F)
- Boiling point: (O_{2}) 90.188 K (−182.962 °C, −297.332 °F)
- Density (at STP): 1.429 g/L
- when liquid (at b.p.): 1.141 g/cm^{3}
- Triple point: 54.361 K, 0.1463 kPa
- Critical point: 154.581 K, 5.043 MPa
- Heat of fusion: (O_{2}) 0.444 kJ/mol
- Heat of vaporization: (O_{2}) 6.82 kJ/mol
- Molar heat capacity: 14.689 J/(mol·K) (O); 29.378 J/(mol·K) (O_{2})
- Specific heat capacity: 918.12 J/(kg·K) (O)
Vapor pressure
P (Pa)	1	10	100	1 k	10 k	100 k
at T (K)				61	73	90

Atomic properties
- Oxidation states: common: −2 −1, 0, +1, +2
- Electronegativity: Pauling scale: 3.44
- Ionization energies: 1st: 1313.9 kJ/mol; 2nd: 3388.3 kJ/mol; 3rd: 5300.5 kJ/mol; (more)
- Covalent radius: 66±2 pm
- Van der Waals radius: 152 pm
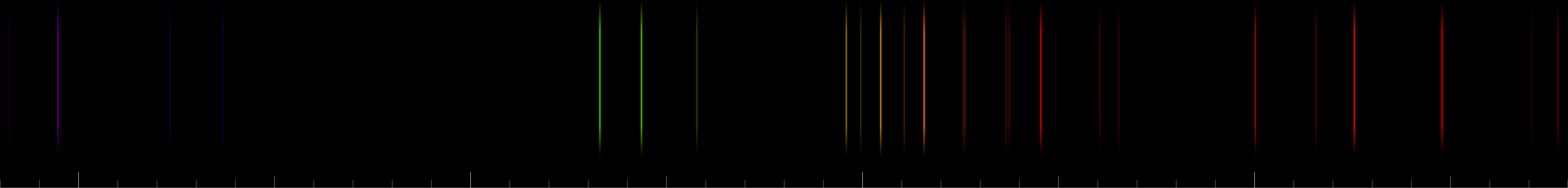
- Spectral lines of oxygen

Other properties
- Natural occurrence: primordial
- Crystal structure: cubic (cP16)
- Lattice constant: a = 678.28 pm (at t.p.)
- Thermal conductivity: 26.58×10^{−3} W/(m⋅K)
- Magnetic ordering: paramagnetic
- Molar magnetic susceptibility: +3449.0×10^{−6} cm^{3}/mol (293 K)
- Speed of sound: 330 m/s (gas, at 27 °C)
- CAS Number: 7782-44-7

History
- Naming: from the Greek ὀξύς (acid, literally 'sharp', from the taste of acids) and -γενής (producer)
- Discovery: Michael Sendivogius; Carl Wilhelm Scheele (1604, 1771)
- Named by: Antoine Lavoisier (1777)

Isotopes of oxygen
Main isotopes			Decay	
Isotope	abundance	half-life (t_{1/2})	mode	product
^{15}O	trace	122.27 s	β^{+}	^{15}N
^{16}O	99.8%	stable		
^{17}O	0.0384%	stable		
^{18}O	0.205%	stable		

Oxygen is a chemical element; it has the symbol O and its atomic number is 8. It is a member of the chalcogen group in the periodic table. It is highly reactive, a nonmetal, and a potent oxidizing agent that readily forms oxides with most elements as well as with other compounds. Oxygen is the most abundant element in Earth's crust, making up almost half of the Earth's crust in the form of various oxides such as water, carbon dioxide, iron oxides, and silicates. It is also the third-most abundant element in the universe after hydrogen and helium.

At standard temperature and pressure, two oxygen atoms will bind covalently to form dioxygen, a colorless and odorless diatomic gas with the chemical formula O_{2}. Dioxygen gas currently constitutes approximately 20.95% molar fraction of the Earth's atmosphere, though this has changed considerably over long periods of time in Earth's history. The much rarer allotrope of oxygen, ozone (O_{3}), strongly absorbs the UVB and UVC wavelengths and forms a protective ozone layer at the lower stratosphere, which shields the biosphere from ionizing ultraviolet radiation. However, ozone present at the surface is a corrosive byproduct of smog and thus an air pollutant.

Aerobic respiration in cells extracts chemical energy by the reaction of oxygen with organic molecules derived from food and releases carbon dioxide as a waste product. Many major classes of organic molecules in living organisms contain oxygen atoms, such as proteins, nucleic acids, carbohydrates, and fats, as do the major constituent inorganic compounds of animal shells, teeth, and bone. Most of the mass of living organisms is oxygen as a component of water, the major constituent of lifeforms. Oxygen in Earth's atmosphere is produced by biotic photosynthesis, in which photon energy in sunlight is captured by chlorophyll to split water molecules and then react with carbon dioxide to produce carbohydrates, with oxygen released as a byproduct. Oxygen is too chemically reactive to remain a free element in air without being continuously replenished by the photosynthetic activities of autotrophs such as cyanobacteria, chloroplast-bearing algae, and land plants.

Oxygen was isolated by Michael Sendivogius before 1604, but it is commonly believed that the element was discovered independently by Carl Wilhelm Scheele, in Uppsala, in 1773 or earlier, and Joseph Priestley in Wiltshire, in 1774. Priority is often given for Priestley because his work was published first. Priestley, however, called oxygen "dephlogisticated air", and did not recognize it as a chemical element. In 1777, Antoine Lavoisier first recognized oxygen as a chemical element and correctly characterized the role it plays in combustion.

Common industrial uses of oxygen include production of steel, plastics and textiles, brazing, welding and cutting of steels and other metals, rocket propellant, oxygen therapy, and life-support systems in aircraft, submarines, spaceflight, and diving.

== History of study ==
The modern concept of the element oxygen developed over five centuries and included many related discoveries and unsuccessful theories. Multiple people made different contributions to the concept. No one person discovered oxygen.

=== Early experiments ===
One of the first known experiments on the relationship between combustion and air was conducted by the 2nd-century BCE Greek writer on mechanics, Philo of Byzantium. In his work Pneumatica, Philo observed that inverting a vessel over a burning candle and surrounding the vessel's neck with water resulted in some water rising into the neck. Philo incorrectly surmised that parts of the air in the vessel were converted into the classical element fire and thus were able to escape through pores in the glass. Many centuries later Ibn al-Nafis, writing in 1250 CE, correctly described oxygenation of blood in the circulatory system; Michael Servetus rediscovered this concept in 1553 but his books were systematically destroyed. A scientifically based and influential description was published by William Harvey in 1628.

Leonardo da Vinci observed that a portion of air is consumed during combustion and respiration. Polish alchemist, philosopher, and physician Michael Sendivogius (Michał Sędziwój), writing in 1604, described a substance contained in air, referring to it as cibus vitae ('food of life'); this substance is identical with oxygen. During his experiments, performed between 1598 and 1604, Sendivogius properly recognized that the substance is equivalent to the gaseous byproduct released by the thermal decomposition of potassium nitrate. However, this important connection was not understood by contemporary scientists like Robert Boyle.

Unaware of Sendivogius's work, John Mayow wrote about a portion of air that provided heat in a fire and the human body. This work was ignored because it failed to align with the prevailing phlogiston theory of air and fire. Mayow observed that antimony increased in weight when heated, and inferred that the nitroaereus must have combined with it. He also thought that the lungs separate nitroaereus from air and pass it into the blood and that animal heat and muscle movement result from the reaction of nitroaereus with certain substances in the body. Accounts of these and other experiments and ideas were published in 1668 in his work Tractatus duo in the tract "De respiratione".

After Robert Boyle proved that air is necessary for combustion in the late 17th century, English chemist John Mayow refined this work by showing that fire requires only a part of air that he called spiritus nitroaereus. In one experiment, he found that placing either a mouse or a lit candle in a closed container over water caused the water to rise and replace one-fourteenth of the air's volume before extinguishing the subjects. From this, he surmised that nitroaereus is consumed in both respiration and combustion.

=== Phlogiston theory ===
Robert Hooke, Ole Borch, Mikhail Lomonosov, and Pierre Bayen all produced oxygen in experiments in the 17th and the 18th century but none of them recognized it as a chemical element. This may have been in part due to the prevalence of the philosophy of combustion and corrosion called the phlogiston theory, which was then the favored explanation of those processes.

Established in 1667 by the German alchemist J. J. Becher and modified by the chemist Georg Ernst Stahl by 1731, phlogiston theory stated that all combustible materials were made of two parts. One part, called phlogiston, was given off when the substance containing it was burned, while the dephlogisticated part was thought to be its true form, or calx.

Highly combustible materials that leave little residue, such as wood or coal, were thought to be made mostly of phlogiston, whereas non-combustible substances that corrode, such as iron, contained very little. Air did not play a role in phlogiston theory, nor were any initial quantitative experiments conducted to test the idea; instead, it was based on observations of what happens when something burns, that most common objects appear to become lighter and seem to lose something in the process.

=== Scientific era ===
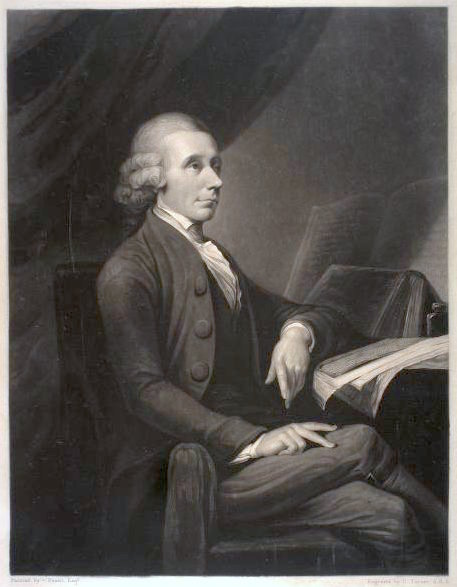
Among several contemporaries who had made discoveries independently from one another, Joseph Priestley was the first to publish his findings on oxygen.

Swedish pharmacist Carl Wilhelm Scheele produced and described some properties of oxygen sometime around 1770–1775 but did not publish his work until a few years later because he was unable to interpret his work in the framework of the phlogiston theory. Scheele had produced oxygen gas by heating mercuric oxide (HgO) and various nitrates in 1771–1772. After reading about Priestley's work in 1775, Scheele published in 1777, calling the gas "fire air" because it was then the only known agent to support combustion.

In the meantime, on August 1, 1774, an experiment conducted by the British clergyman Joseph Priestley focused sunlight on mercuric oxide contained in a glass tube, which liberated a gas he named "dephlogisticated air". He noted that candles burned brighter in the gas and that a mouse was more active and lived longer while breathing it. After breathing the gas himself, Priestley wrote: "The feeling of it to my lungs was not sensibly different from that of common air, but I fancied that my breast felt peculiarly light and easy for some time afterwards." Priestley published his findings in 1775 in a paper titled "An Account of Further Discoveries in Air", which was included in the second volume of his book titled Experiments and Observations on Different Kinds of Air.

The French chemist Antoine Lavoisier later claimed to have discovered the new substance independently. Priestley visited Lavoisier in October 1774 and told him about his experiment and how he liberated the new gas. Scheele had also dispatched a letter to Lavoisier on September 30, 1774, which described his discovery of the previously unknown substance, but Lavoisier never acknowledged receiving it (a copy of the letter was found in Scheele's belongings after his death).

=== Discrediting Phlogiston theory ===
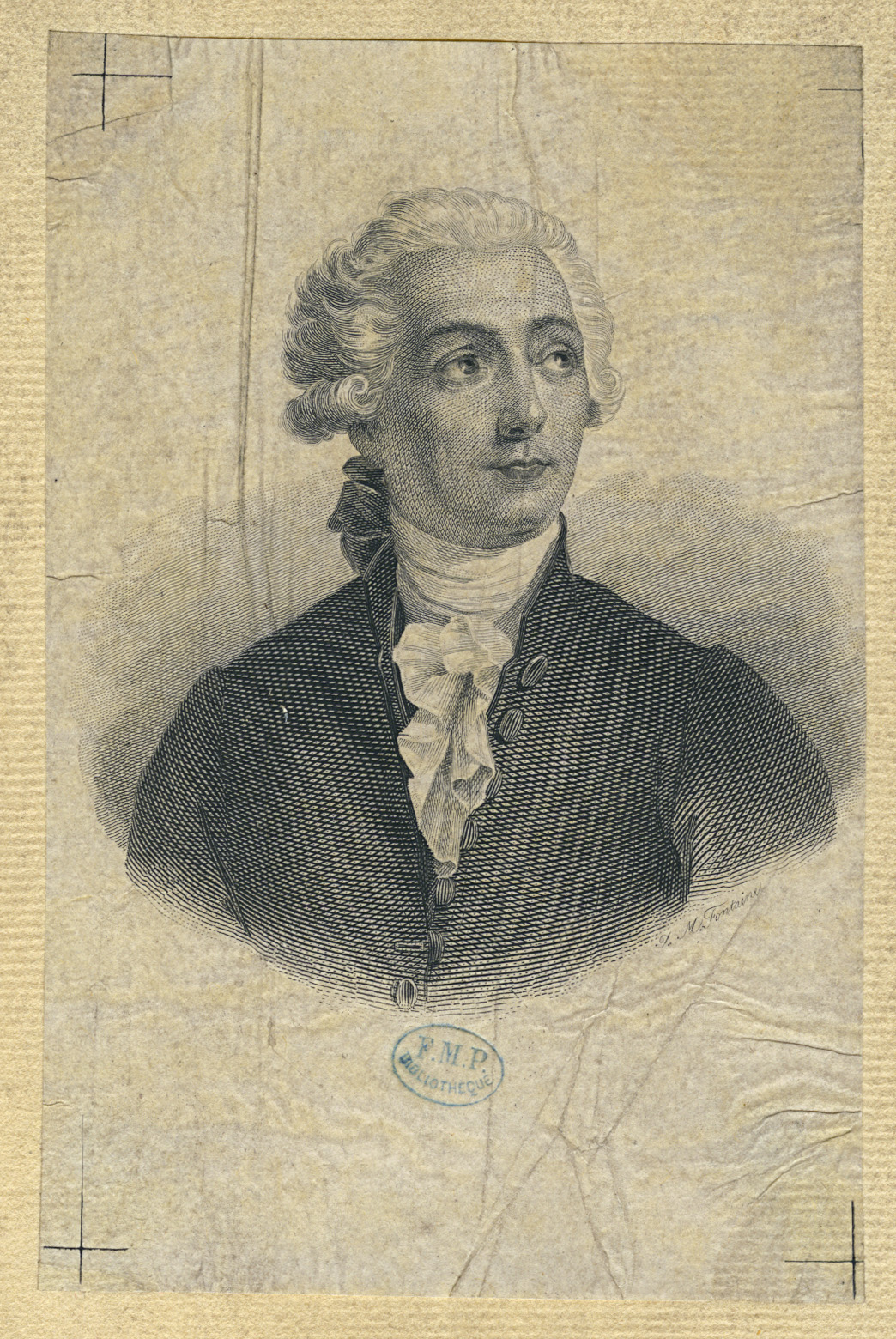
Antoine Lavoisier discredited the phlogiston theory.

Lavoisier conducted the first adequate quantitative experiments on oxidation and gave the first correct explanation of how combustion works. He used these and similar experiments, which began in 1774, to discredit the phlogiston theory and to prove that the substance discovered by Priestley and Scheele was a chemical element.

In one experiment, Lavoisier observed that there was no overall increase in weight when tin and air were heated in a closed container. He noted that air rushed in when he opened the container, which indicated that part of the trapped air had been consumed. He also noted that the tin had increased in weight and that the increase was the same as the weight of the air that rushed back in. This and other experiments on combustion were documented in his book "On General Combustion" (Sur la combustion en général), which was published in 1777. In that work, he proved that air is a mixture of two gases: 'vital air', which is essential to combustion and respiration, and azote (from Greek ἄζωτον 'lifeless'), which did not support either. Azote later became nitrogen in English, although it has kept the earlier name in French and several other European languages.

==== Etymology ====
Lavoisier renamed "vital air" to oxygène in 1777 from the Greek roots oxys (ὀξύς; "acid", literally 'sharp', from the taste of acids) and -genēs (-γενής; "producer", literally 'begetter') because he mistakenly believed that oxygen was a constituent of all acids. Chemists (such as Sir Humphry Davy in 1812) eventually determined that Lavoisier was wrong in this regard (e.g. Hydrogen chloride (HCl) is a strong acid that does not contain oxygen), but by then the name was too well established.

Oxygen entered the English language despite opposition by English scientists and the fact that the Englishman Priestley had first isolated the gas and written about it. This is partly due to a poem praising the gas titled "Oxygen" in the popular book The Botanic Garden (1791) by Erasmus Darwin, grandfather of Charles Darwin.

=== Later history ===
John Dalton's original atomic hypothesis presumed that all elements were monatomic and that the atoms in compounds would normally have the simplest atomic ratios with respect to one another. For example, Dalton assumed that water's formula was HO, leading to the conclusion that the atomic mass of oxygen was 8 times that of hydrogen, instead of the modern value of about 16. In 1805, Joseph Louis Gay-Lussac and Alexander von Humboldt showed that water is formed of two volumes of hydrogen and one volume of oxygen, and by 1811, Amedeo Avogadro had arrived at the correct interpretation of water's composition, based on what is now called Avogadro's law and the diatomic elemental molecules in those gases.

In 1879 the French brothers Quentin and Arthur Brin discovered a commercially viable reaction to create oxygen. They realized that the known reversible reaction 2BaO(s) + O_{2}(g) ↔ 2BaO_{2}(s) was deactivated by the formation of barium carbonate from carbon dioxide in the air; treating air to remove the carbon dioxide allowed the reaction be reversed indefinitely. Their company used the process between 1886 and 1906, at which point the more economical fractional distillation began to be used.

Robert H. Goddard and a liquid-oxygen–gasoline rocket

By the late 19th century, scientists realized that air could be liquefied and its components isolated by compressing and cooling it. Using a cascade method, Swiss chemist and physicist Raoul Pierre Pictet evaporated liquid sulfur dioxide in order to liquefy carbon dioxide, which in turn was evaporated to cool oxygen gas enough to liquefy it. On December 22, 1877, he sent a telegram to the French Academy of Sciences in Paris announcing his discovery of liquid oxygen. Just two days later, French physicist Louis Paul Cailletet announced his own method of liquefying molecular oxygen. Only a few drops of the liquid were produced in each case and no meaningful analysis could be conducted. Oxygen was liquefied in a stable state for the first time on March 29, 1883, by Polish scientists Zygmunt Wróblewski and Karol Olszewski from Jagiellonian University.

In 1891 Scottish chemist James Dewar was able to produce enough liquid oxygen for study. The first commercially viable process for producing liquid oxygen was independently developed in 1895 by German engineer Carl von Linde and British engineer William Hampson. Both men lowered the temperature of air until it liquefied and then distilled the component gases by boiling them off one at a time and capturing them separately. Later, in 1901, oxyacetylene welding was demonstrated for the first time by burning a mixture of acetylene and compressed O_{2}. This method of welding and cutting metal later became common.

In 1923, the American scientist Robert H. Goddard became the first person to develop a rocket engine that burned liquid fuel; the engine used gasoline for fuel and liquid oxygen as the oxidizer. Goddard successfully flew a small liquid-fueled rocket 56 m at 97 km/h on March 16, 1926, in Auburn, Massachusetts.

== Characteristics ==
=== Properties and molecular structure ===
Orbital diagram, after Barrett (2002), showing the participating atomic orbitals from each oxygen atom, the molecular orbitals that result from their overlap, and the aufbau filling of the orbitals with the 12 electrons, 6 from each O atom, beginning from the lowest-energy orbitals, and resulting in covalent double-bond character from filled orbitals (and cancellation of the contributions of the pairs of σ and σ^{*} and π and π^{*} orbital pairs).

At standard temperature and pressure, oxygen is a colorless, odorless, and tasteless gas with the molecular formula O_{2}, referred to as dioxygen.

As dioxygen, two oxygen atoms are chemically bound to each other. The bond can be variously described based on level of theory, but is reasonably and simply described as a covalent double bond that results from the filling of molecular orbitals formed from the atomic orbitals of the individual oxygen atoms, the filling of which results in a bond order of two. More specifically, the double bond is the result of sequential, low-to-high energy, or Aufbau, filling of orbitals, and the resulting cancellation of contributions from the 2s electrons, after sequential filling of the low σ and σ^{*} orbitals; σ overlap of the two atomic 2p orbitals that lie along the O–O molecular axis and π overlap of two pairs of atomic 2p orbitals perpendicular to the O–O molecular axis, and then cancellation of contributions from the remaining two 2p electrons after their partial filling of the π^{*} orbitals.

This combination of cancellations and σ and π overlaps results in dioxygen's double-bond character and reactivity, as well as the presence of a triplet electronic ground state. An electron configuration with two unpaired electrons, as is found in dioxygen orbitals (see the filled π* orbitals in the diagram), that are of equal energy—i.e., degenerate—is a configuration termed a spin triplet state. Hence, the ground state of the O_{2} molecule is referred to as triplet oxygen. The highest-energy, partially filled orbitals are antibonding, and so their filling weakens the bond order from three to two. Because of its unpaired electrons, triplet oxygen reacts only slowly with most organic molecules, which have paired electron spins; this prevents spontaneous combustion.

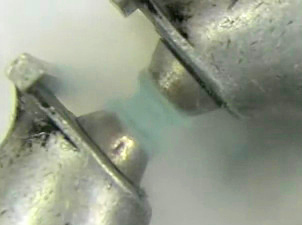
Liquid oxygen, temporarily suspended in a magnet owing to its paramagnetism

In the triplet form, O_{2} molecules are paramagnetic. That is, they impart magnetic character to oxygen when it is in the presence of a magnetic field, because of the spin of the unpaired electrons in the molecule and the negative exchange energy between neighboring O_{2} molecules. Liquid oxygen is so magnetic that, in laboratory demonstrations, a bridge of liquid oxygen may be supported against its own weight between the poles of a powerful magnet. Oxygen's paramagnetism can be used in paramagnetic oxygen gas analysers that determine gaseous oxygen concentration, especially in industrial process control and medicine.

Singlet oxygen is a name given to several higher-energy species of molecular O_{2} in which all the electron spins are paired. It is much more reactive with common organic molecules than normal (triplet) molecular oxygen. In nature, singlet oxygen is commonly formed from water during photosynthesis, using the energy of sunlight. It is also produced in the troposphere by the photolysis of ozone by light of short wavelength and by the immune system as a source of active oxygen. Carotenoids in photosynthetic organisms (and possibly animals) play a major role in absorbing energy from singlet oxygen and converting it to the unexcited ground state before it can cause harm to tissues.

=== Allotropes ===
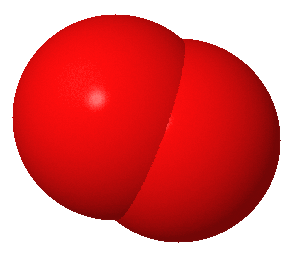
Space-filling model representation of dioxygen (O_{2}) molecule

The common allotrope of elemental oxygen on Earth is called dioxygen, O_{2}, the allotrope that is major part of the Earth's atmospheric oxygen (see occurrence). O_{2} has a bond length of 121 pm and a bond energy of 498 kJ/mol. Trioxygen (O_{3}) is usually known as ozone and is a very reactive allotrope of oxygen that is damaging to lung tissue. Ozone is produced in the upper atmosphere when O_{2} combines with atomic oxygen made by the splitting of O_{2} by ultraviolet (UV) radiation. Since ozone absorbs strongly in the UV region of the spectrum, the ozone layer of the upper atmosphere functions as a protective radiation shield for the planet. Near the Earth's surface, ozone is a pollutant formed as a by-product of automobile exhaust. At low Earth orbit altitudes, sufficient atomic oxygen is present to cause corrosion of spacecraft.

The metastable molecule tetraoxygen (O_{4}) was discovered in 2001 and was assumed to exist in one of the six phases of solid oxygen. In 2006, this phase, created by pressurizing O_{2} to 20 GPa, was shown to form a rhombohedral O_{8} cluster. This cluster has the potential to be a much more powerful oxidizer than either O_{2} or O_{3} and may therefore be used in rocket fuel. A metallic phase was discovered in 1990 when solid oxygen is subjected to a pressure of above 96 GPa; it was shown in 1998 that at very low temperatures, this phase becomes superconducting.

=== Physical properties ===
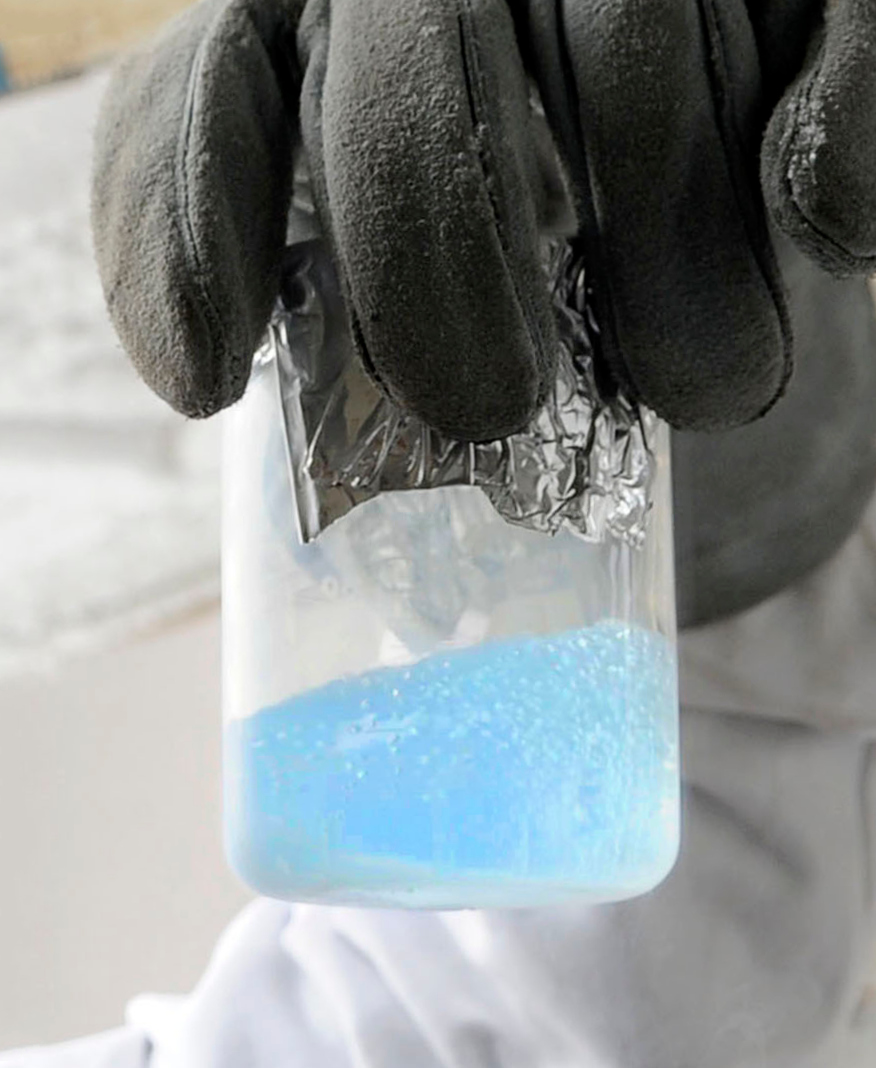
Liquid oxygen boiling (O_{2})

Oxygen dissolves more readily in water than nitrogen does. Water in equilibrium with air contains approximately 1 molecule of dissolved O_{2} for every 2 molecules of N_{2} (1:2), compared with an atmospheric ratio of approximately 1:4. The solubility of oxygen in water is temperature-dependent, and about twice as much (14.6 mg/L) dissolves at 0 °C (32 °F) than at 20 °C (68 °F) (7.6 mg/L).

At 25 °C (77 °F) and 1 standard atmosphere (101.325 kPa) in air, freshwater can dissolve about 6.04 milliliters (mL) of oxygen per liter, while seawater contains about 4.95 mL per liter. At 5 °C (41 °F) the solubility increases to 9.0 mL (50% more than at 25 °C (77 °F)) per liter for freshwater and 7.2 mL (45% more) per liter for sea water.

Oxygen gas dissolved in water at sea-level (milliliters per liter)
	5 °C (41 °F)	25 °C (77 °F)
Freshwater	9.00	6.04
Seawater	7.20	4.95

Oxygen condenses at 90.20 K (−182.95 °C, −297.31 °F) and freezes at 54.36 K (−218.79 °C, −361.82 °F). Both liquid and solid O_{2} are clear substances with a light sky-blue color caused by absorption in the red (in contrast with the blue color of the sky, which is due to Rayleigh scattering of blue light). High-purity liquid O_{2} is usually obtained by the fractional distillation of liquefied air. Liquid oxygen may also be condensed from air using liquid nitrogen as a coolant. Liquid oxygen is a highly reactive substance and must be segregated from combustible materials.

The spectroscopy of molecular oxygen is associated with the atmospheric processes of aurora and airglow. The absorption in the Herzberg continuum and Schumann–Runge bands in the ultraviolet produces atomic oxygen that is important in the chemistry of the middle atmosphere. Excited-state singlet molecular oxygen is responsible for red chemiluminescence in solution.

Table of thermal and physical properties of oxygen (O_{2}) at atmospheric pressure:

Temperature (K)	Density (kg/m^{3})	Specific heat (kJ/(kg·K))	Dynamic viscosity (kg/(m·s))	Kinematic viscosity (m^{2}/s)	Thermal conductivity (W/(m·K))	Thermal diffusivity (m^{2}/s)	Prandtl Number
100	3.945	0.962	7.64E-06	1.94E-06	0.00925	2.44E-06	0.796
150	2.585	0.921	1.15E-05	4.44E-06	0.0138	5.80E-06	0.766
200	1.93	0.915	1.48E-05	7.64E-06	0.0183	1.04E-05	0.737
250	1.542	0.915	1.79E-05	1.16E-05	0.0226	1.60E-05	0.723
300	1.284	0.92	2.07E-05	1.61E-05	0.0268	2.27E-05	0.711
350	1.1	0.929	2.34E-05	2.12E-05	0.0296	2.90E-05	0.733
400	0.962	1.0408	2.58E-05	2.68E-05	0.033	3.64E-05	0.737
450	0.8554	0.956	2.81E-05	3.29E-05	0.0363	4.44E-05	0.741
500	0.7698	0.972	3.03E-05	3.94E-05	0.0412	5.51E-05	0.716
550	0.6998	0.988	3.24E-05	4.63E-05	0.0441	6.38E-05	0.726
600	0.6414	1.003	3.44E-05	5.36E-05	0.0473	7.35E-05	0.729
700	0.5498	1.031	3.81E-05	6.93E-05	0.0528	9.31E-05	0.744
800	0.481	1.054	4.15E-05	8.63E-05	0.0589	1.16E-04	0.743
900	0.4275	1.074	4.47E-05	1.05E-04	0.0649	1.41E-04	0.74
1000	0.3848	1.09	4.77E-05	1.24E-04	0.071	1.69E-04	0.733
1100	0.3498	1.103	5.06E-05	1.45E-04	0.0758	1.96E-04	0.736
1200	0.3206	1.0408	5.33E-05	1.661E-04	0.0819	2.29E-04	0.725
1300	0.296	1.125	5.88E-05	1.99E-04	0.0871	2.62E-04	0.721

=== Isotopes and stellar origin ===
Late in a massive star's life, ^{16}O concentrates in the O-shell, ^{17}O in the H-shell and ^{18}O in the He-shell.

Naturally occurring oxygen is composed of three stable isotopes, ^{16}O, ^{17}O, and ^{18}O, with ^{16}O being the most abundant (99.762% natural abundance).

^{16}O is one of the dominant fusion products in massive stars. It is synthesized at the end of the triple-alpha process with some synthesis in the neon burning process. Both ^{17}O and ^{18}O require seed nuclei. ^{17}O is primarily made by the burning of hydrogen into helium during the CNO cycle, making it a common isotope in the hydrogen burning zones of stars. Most ^{18}O is produced when ^{14}N (made abundant from CNO burning) captures a ^{4}He nucleus, making ^{18}O common in the helium-rich zones of evolved, massive stars.

Fifteen radioisotopes have been characterized, ranging from ^{11}O to ^{28}O. The most stable are ^{15}O with a half-life of 122.24 seconds and ^{14}O with a half-life of 70.606 seconds. All of the remaining radioactive isotopes have half-lives that are less than 27 seconds, and the majority of them have half-lives that are less than 83 milliseconds. The most common decay mode of the isotopes lighter than ^{16}O is β^{+} decay to yield nitrogen, and the most common mode for the isotopes heavier than ^{18}O is beta decay to yield fluorine.

=== Occurrence ===
Ten most common elements in the Milky Way Galaxy estimated spectroscopically
Z	Element	Mass fraction in parts per million
1	Hydrogen	739,000
2	Helium	240,000
8	Oxygen	10,400
6	Carbon	4,600
10	Neon	1,340
26	Iron	1,090
7	Nitrogen	960
14	Silicon	650
12	Magnesium	580
16	Sulfur	440

Oxygen is the third most abundant chemical element in the universe, after hydrogen and helium. About 0.9% of the Sun's mass is oxygen. Oxygen constitutes 49.2% of the Earth's crust by mass as part of oxide compounds such as silicon dioxide and is the most abundant element by mass in the Earth's crust. It is also the major component of the world's oceans (88.8% by mass). Oxygen gas is the second most common component of the Earth's atmosphere, taking up 20.8% of its volume and 23.1% of its mass (some 10^{15} tonnes). (Note: Figures given are for values up to 80 km (50 mi) above the surface)

Earth is unusual among the planets of the Solar System in having such a high concentration of oxygen gas in its atmosphere. Mars (with 0.1% O_{2} by volume) and Venus have much less. The O_{2} surrounding those planets is produced solely by the action of ultraviolet radiation on oxygen-containing molecules such as carbon dioxide. The unusually high concentration of oxygen gas on Earth is the result of the oxygen cycle. This biogeochemical cycle describes the movement of oxygen within and between its three main reservoirs on Earth: the atmosphere, the biosphere, and the lithosphere. The main driving factor of the oxygen cycle is photosynthesis, which is responsible for modern Earth's atmosphere. Photosynthesis releases oxygen into the atmosphere, while respiration, decay, and combustion remove it from the atmosphere. In the present equilibrium, production and consumption occur at the same rate.

Oxygen levels in the atmosphere are trending slightly downward globally, possibly because of fossil-fuel burning.

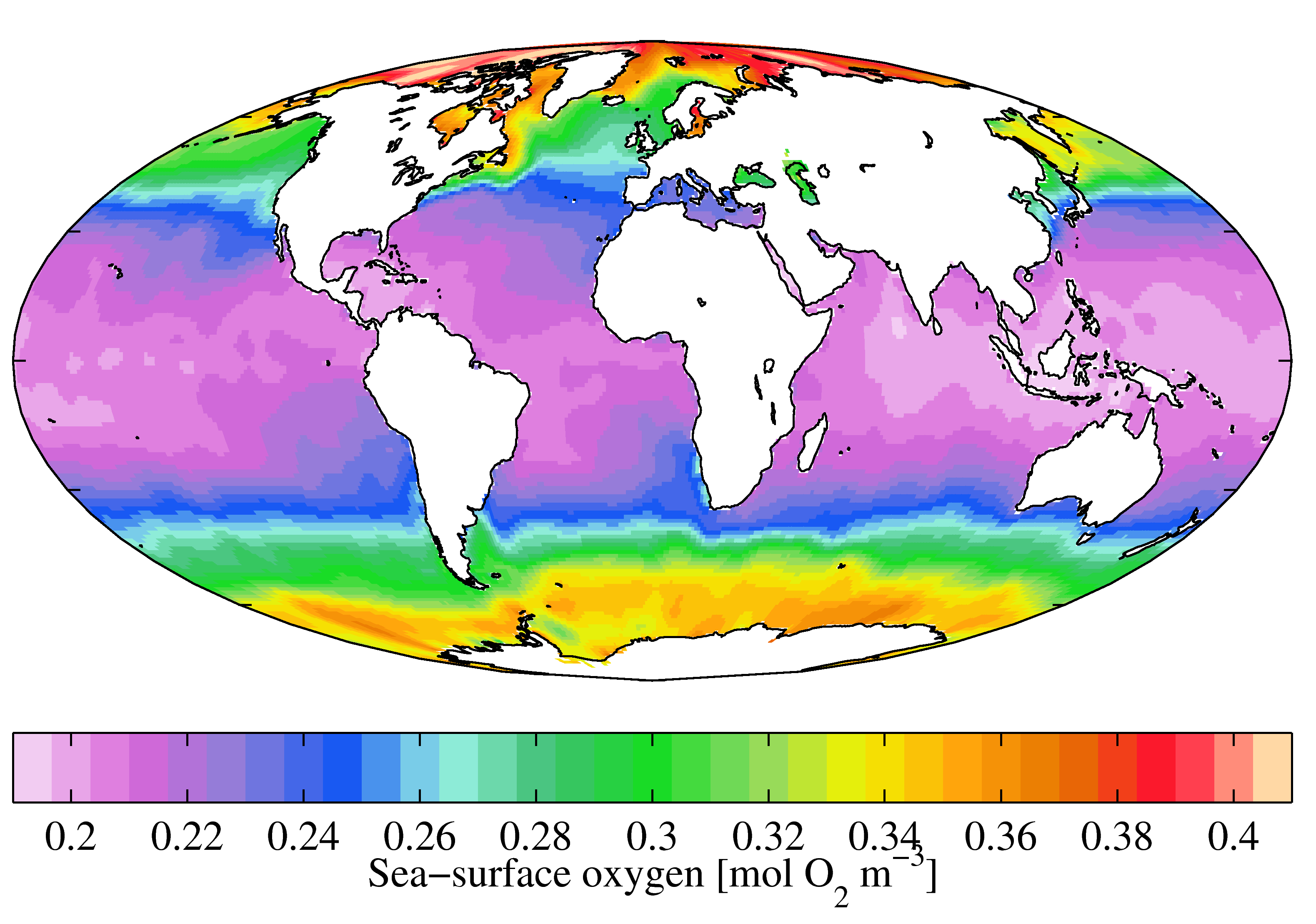
Cold water holds more dissolved O_{2}.

Free oxygen also occurs in solution in the world's water bodies. The increased solubility of O_{2} at lower temperatures (see Physical properties) has important implications for ocean life, as polar oceans support a much higher density of life due to their higher oxygen content. Scientists assess this aspect of water quality by measuring the water's biochemical oxygen demand, or the amount of O_{2} needed to restore it to a normal concentration. Significant deoxygenation has been observed in tropical oceans. Warming oceans' waters are expected to lose oxygen over the next century and into the future for a thousand years; the possible consequences include minimal oxygen zones which are unable to support macrofauna.

=== Analysis ===
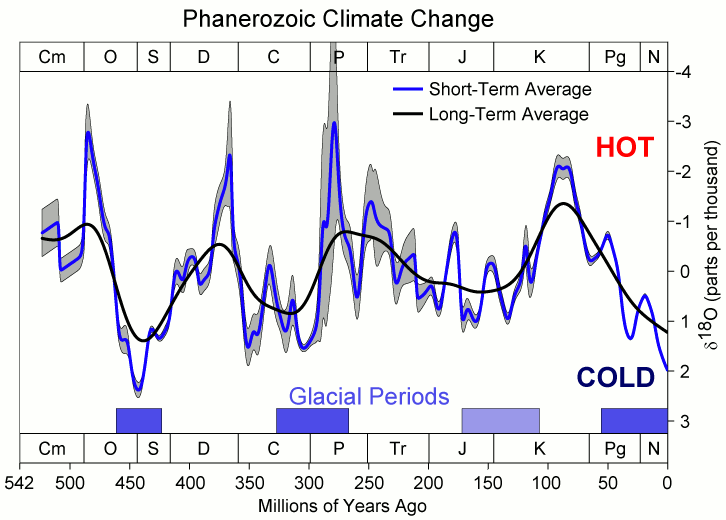
500 million years of climate change vs. ^{18}O

Paleoclimatologists measure the ratio of oxygen-18 and oxygen-16 in the shells and skeletons of marine organisms to determine the climate millions of years ago (see oxygen isotope ratio cycle). Seawater molecules that contain the lighter isotope, oxygen-16, evaporate at a slightly faster rate than water molecules containing the 12% heavier oxygen-18, and this disparity increases at lower temperatures. During periods of lower global temperatures, snow and rain from that evaporated water tends to be higher in oxygen-16, and the seawater left behind tends to be higher in oxygen-18. Marine organisms then incorporate more oxygen-18 into their skeletons and shells than they would in a warmer climate. Paleoclimatologists also directly measure this ratio in the water molecules of ice core samples as old as hundreds of thousands of years.

Planetary geologists have measured the relative quantities of oxygen isotopes in samples from the Earth, the Moon, Mars, and meteorites, but were long unable to obtain reference values for the isotope ratios in the Sun, believed to be the same as those of the primordial solar nebula. Analysis of a silicon wafer exposed to the solar wind in space and returned by the crashed Genesis spacecraft has shown that the Sun has a higher proportion of oxygen-16 than does the Earth. The measurement implies that an unknown process depleted oxygen-16 from the Sun's disk of protoplanetary material prior to the coalescence of dust grains that formed the Earth.

Oxygen presents two spectrophotometric absorption bands peaking at wavelengths of 687 and 760 nm. Some remote sensing scientists have proposed using the measurement of the radiance coming from vegetation canopies in those bands to characterize plant health status from a satellite platform. This approach exploits the fact that in those bands it is possible to discriminate the vegetation's reflectance from its fluorescence, which is much weaker. The measurement is technically difficult owing to the low signal-to-noise ratio and the physical structure of vegetation; but it has been proposed as a possible method of monitoring the carbon cycle from satellites on a global scale.

== Biological production and role of O_{2} ==
=== Photosynthesis and respiration ===
Photosynthesis splits water to liberate O_{2} and fixes CO_{2} into sugar in what is called a Calvin cycle.

In nature, free oxygen is produced as a byproduct of light-driven splitting of water during chlorophyllic photosynthesis. According to some estimates, marine photoautotrophs such as red/green algae and cyanobacteria provide about 70% of the free oxygen produced on Earth, and the rest is produced in terrestrial environments by plants. Other estimates of the oceanic contribution to atmospheric oxygen are higher, while some estimates are lower, suggesting oceans produce ~45% of Earth's atmospheric oxygen each year.

A simplified overall formula for photosynthesis is

6 CO_{2} + 6 H_{2}O + photons → C_{6}H_{12}O_{6} + 6 O_{2}

or simply

carbon dioxide + water + sunlight → glucose + dioxygen

Photolytic oxygen evolution occurs in the thylakoid membranes of photosynthetic organisms and requires the energy of four photons. (Note: Thylakoid membranes are part of chloroplasts in algae and plants while they simply are one of many membrane structures in cyanobacteria. In fact, chloroplasts are thought to have evolved from cyanobacteria that were once symbiotic partners with the progenitors of plants and algae.) Many steps are involved, but the result is the formation of a proton gradient across the thylakoid membrane, which is used to synthesize adenosine triphosphate (ATP) via photophosphorylation. The O_{2} remaining (after production of the water molecule) is released into the atmosphere. (Note: Water oxidation is catalyzed by a manganese-containing enzyme complex known as the oxygen evolving complex (OEC) or water-splitting complex found associated with the lumenal side of thylakoid membranes. Manganese is an important cofactor, and calcium and chloride are also required for the reaction to occur. (Raven 2005))

Oxygen is used in mitochondria of eukaryotes to generate ATP during oxidative phosphorylation. The reaction for aerobic respiration is essentially the reverse of photosynthesis and is simplified as

C_{6}H_{12}O_{6} + 6 O_{2} → 6 CO_{2} + 6 H_{2}O + 2880 kJ/mol

In aquatic animals, dissolved oxygen in water is absorbed by gills, through the skin, or via the gut; in terrestrial animals such as tetrapods, oxygen in air is actively taken into the body via lungs, where gas exchange takes place to diffuse oxygen into the blood and carbon dioxide out, and the body's circulatory system then transports the oxygen to other tissues where cellular respiration takes place. However, in insects, the most successful and biodiverse terrestrial clade, oxygen is directly conducted to the internal tissues via a deep network of airways. Hemoglobin in red blood cells binds O_{2}, changing color from bluish red to bright red (CO_{2} is released from another part of hemoglobin through the Bohr effect). Other terrestrial invertebrates use hemocyanin (molluscs and some arthropods) or hemerythrin (spiders and lobsters) instead. A liter of blood can dissolve up to 200 cm^{3} of O_{2}.

Until the discovery of anaerobic organisms, oxygen was thought to be a requirement for all complex life.

Reactive oxygen species, such as superoxide ion (O^{−}_{2}) and hydrogen peroxide (H_{2}O_{2}), are reactive by-products of oxygen use in organisms. Parts of the immune system of higher organisms create peroxide, superoxide, and singlet oxygen to destroy invading microbes. Reactive oxygen species also play an important role in the hypersensitive response of plants against pathogen attack. Oxygen is damaging to obligately anaerobic organisms, which were the dominant form of early life on Earth until O_{2} began to accumulate in the atmosphere about 2.5 billion years ago during the Great Oxygenation Event, about a billion years after the first appearance of these organisms.

An adult human at rest inhales 1.8 to 2.4 grams of oxygen per minute. This amounts to more than 6 billion tonnes of oxygen inhaled by humanity per year. (Note: (1.8 grams/min/person)×(60 min/h)×(24 h/day)×(365 days/year)×(6.6 billion people)/1,000,000 g/t=6.24 billion tonnes)

=== Living organisms ===
Partial pressures of oxygen in the human body (PO_{2})
Unit	Alveolar pulmonary gas pressures	Arterial blood oxygen	Venous blood gas
kPa	14.2	11 (Note: Derived from mmHg values using 0.133322 kPa/mmHg)-13	4.0-5.3
mmHg	107	75-100	30-40

The free oxygen partial pressure in the body of a living vertebrate organism is highest in the respiratory system, and decreases along any arterial system, peripheral tissues, and venous system, respectively. Partial pressure is the pressure that oxygen would have if it alone occupied the volume.

=== Build-up in the atmosphere ===
O_{2} build-up in Earth's atmosphere: 1) no O_{2} produced; 2) O_{2} produced, but absorbed in oceans & seabed rock; 3) O_{2} starts to gas out of the oceans, but is absorbed by land surfaces and formation of ozone layer; 4–5) O_{2} sinks filled and the gas accumulates

Before photosynthesis evolved, Earth's atmosphere had little free diatomic elemental oxygen (O_{2}). Oxygen began building up in the prebiotic atmosphere at approximately 2.45 Ga during the Neoarchean-Paleoproterozoic boundary, a paleogeological event known as the Great Oxygenation Event (GOE). The concentrations of O_{2} attained were less than 10% of today's and probably fluctuated greatly. Around 500Mya a second event known as the Neoproterozoic Oxygenation Event lead to oxygen levels similar or even higher than the present.

Oxygen is both a result of biological activity and a key enabler. Photosynthesis produces oxygen while plants and animals using aerobic respiration consume it. Consequently, the evolution of life is closely related to the concentration of available oxygen. Understanding the relationship between oxygen and evolution would aid in seeking evidence of extraterrestrial life in exoplanet data. Oxygen concentration plays a key role in the geochemical composition of sedimentary rocks, making oxygen concentration important for geology and sedimentary rocks important for understanding oxygen concentration over geologic time. The increase in oxygen concentrations had wide-ranging and significant impacts on Earth's geochemistry and biosphere. However, detailed connections between oxygen and evolution remain elusive.

Variations in atmospheric oxygen concentration may have shaped past climates. When oxygen declined, atmospheric density dropped, which in turn increased surface evaporation, causing precipitation increases and warmer temperatures.

=== Extraterrestrial free oxygen ===
Small amounts of oxygen have been detected in Europa's and Ganymede's thin oxygen atmospheres, particularly around the polars. This oxygen is believe to result from photodissociation of water.

In the field of astrobiology and in the search for extraterrestrial life, oxygen is considered the strongest biosignature, or sign of biological activity. Oxygen meets the three criteria for a biosignature. Its presence is a reliable indicator of life based on the observation that almost all of Earth's oxygen has biological origin. Second, oxygen persists in the atmosphere over long periods of time, on the order of a billion years. Third, oxygen mixes well in the atmosphere and has strong distinctive absorption lines which can be detected by remote telescopes. One potential issue is that oxygen may be produced abiotically on celestial bodies with processes and conditions (such as a peculiar hydrosphere) which allow build up of free oxygen.

== Industrial production ==
Hofmann electrolysis apparatus used in electrolysis of water

Every year, one hundred million tonnes of O_{2} are extracted from air for industrial uses. The most common method of extraction is fractional distillation of liquefied air, with N_{2} distilling as a vapor while O_{2} is left as a liquid. The other primary method of producing O_{2} is passing a stream of clean, dry air through one bed of a pair of identical zeolite molecular sieves, which absorbs the nitrogen and delivers a gas stream that is 90% to 93% O_{2}. Simultaneously, nitrogen gas is released from the other nitrogen-saturated zeolite bed, by reducing the chamber operating pressure and diverting part of the oxygen gas from the producer bed through it, in the reverse direction of flow. After a set cycle time the operation of the two beds is interchanged, thereby allowing for a continuous supply of gaseous oxygen to be pumped through a pipeline. This is known as pressure swing adsorption. Oxygen gas is increasingly obtained by these non-cryogenic technologies (see also the related vacuum swing adsorption).

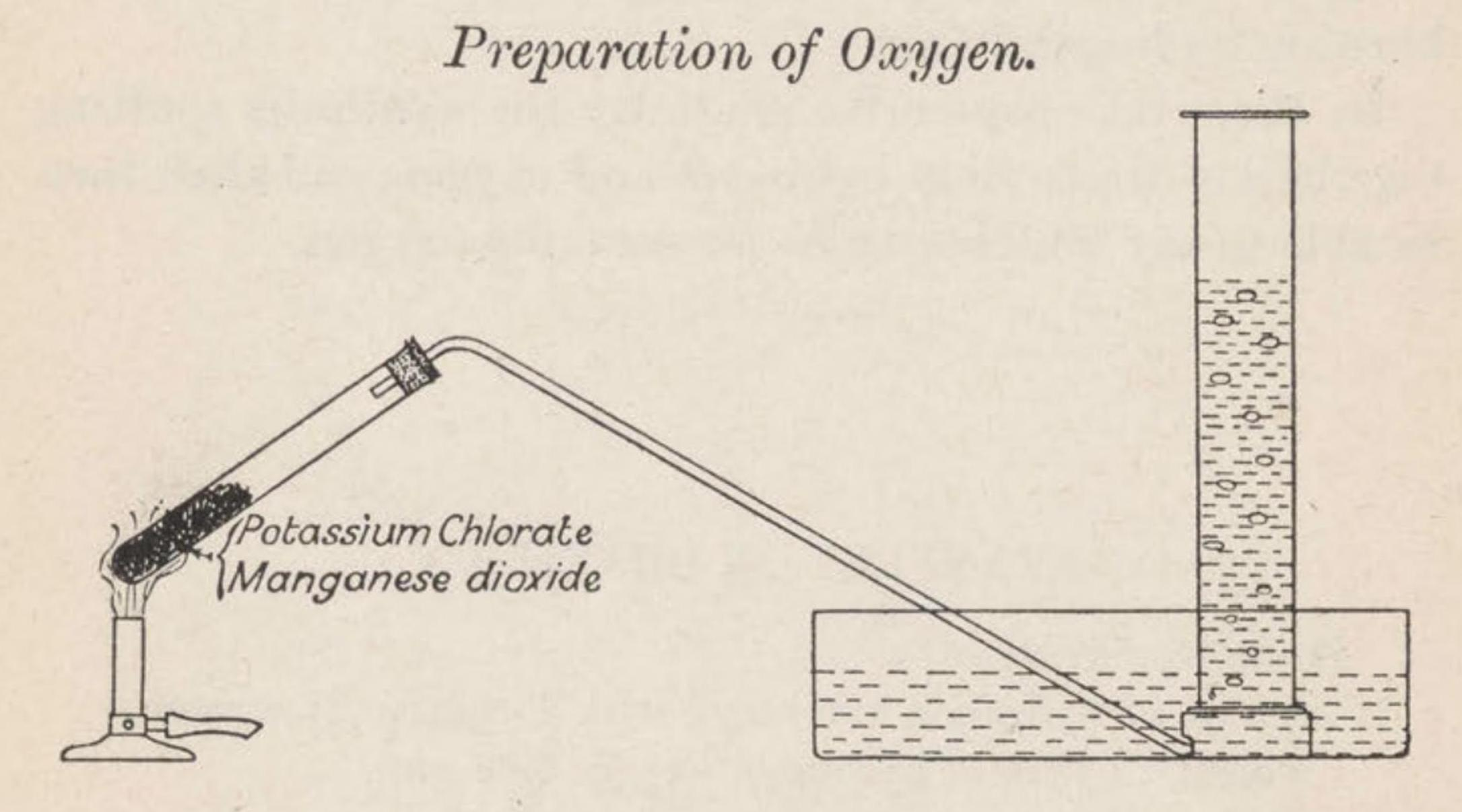
An experiment setup for preparation of oxygen in academic laboratories

In academic laboratories, oxygen can be prepared by heating together potassium chlorate mixed with a small proportion of manganese dioxide.

Oxygen gas can also be produced through electrolysis of water into molecular oxygen and hydrogen. DC electricity must be used: if AC is used, the gases in each limb consist of hydrogen and oxygen in the explosive ratio 2:1. A similar method is the electrocatalytic O_{2} evolution from oxides and oxoacids. Chemical catalysts can be used as well, such as in chemical oxygen generators or oxygen candles that are used as part of the life-support equipment on submarines, and are still part of standard equipment on commercial airliners in case of depressurization emergencies. Another air separation method is forcing air to dissolve through ceramic membranes based on zirconium dioxide by either high pressure or an electric current to produce nearly pure O_{2} gas.

=== Storage ===
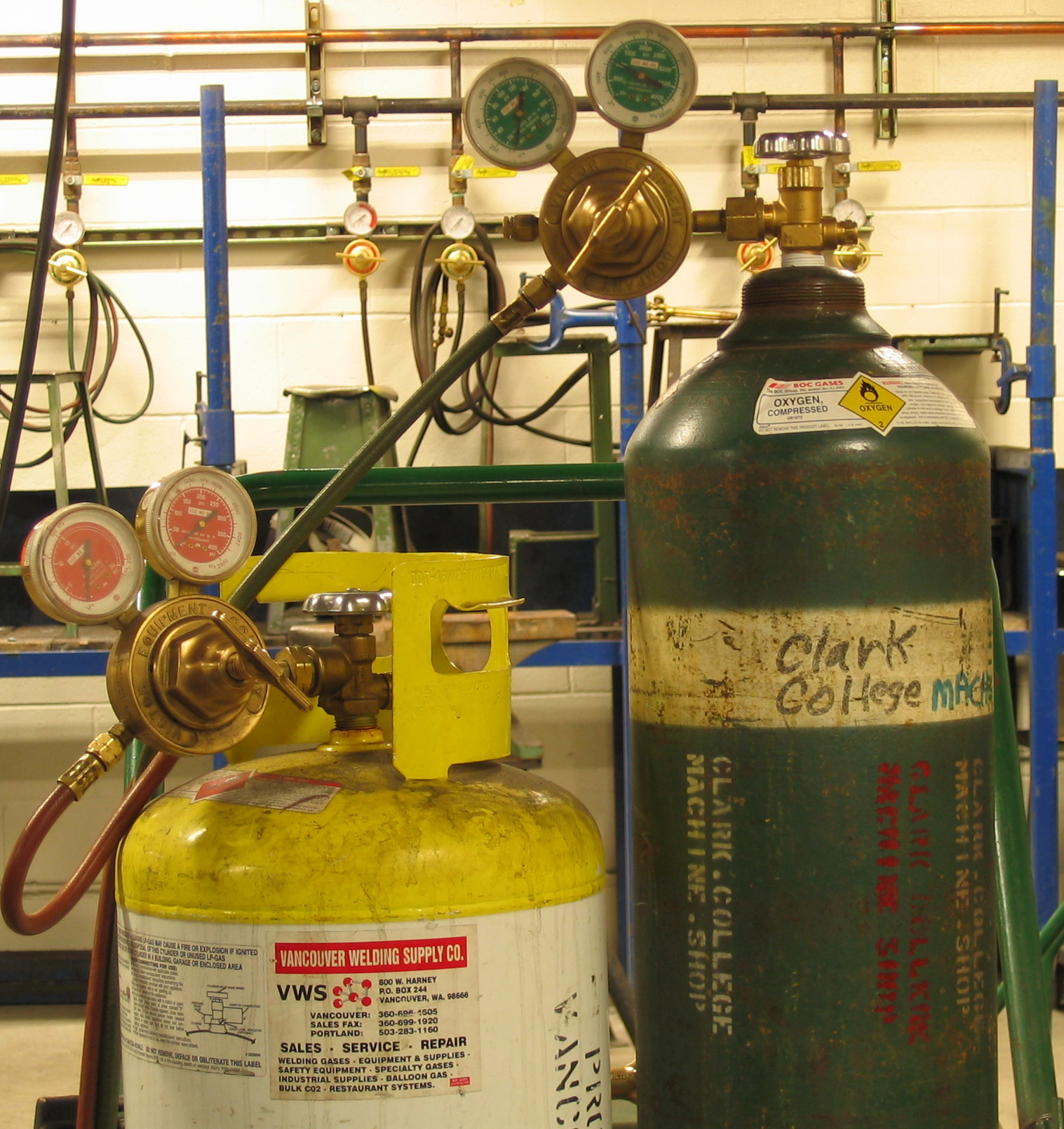
Oxygen and MAPP gas compressed-gas cylinders with regulators

Oxygen storage methods include high-pressure oxygen tanks, cryogenics, and chemical compounds. For economic reasons, oxygen is often transported in bulk as a liquid in specially insulated tankers, since one liter of liquefied oxygen is equivalent to 840 liters of gaseous oxygen at atmospheric pressure and 20 °C (68 °F). Such tankers are used to refill bulk liquid-oxygen storage containers, which stand outside hospitals and other institutions that need large volumes of pure oxygen gas. Liquid oxygen is passed through heat exchangers, which convert the cryogenic liquid into gas before it enters the building. Oxygen is also stored and shipped in smaller cylinders containing the compressed gas; a form that is useful in certain portable medical applications and oxy-fuel welding and cutting.

== Applications ==
=== Medical ===
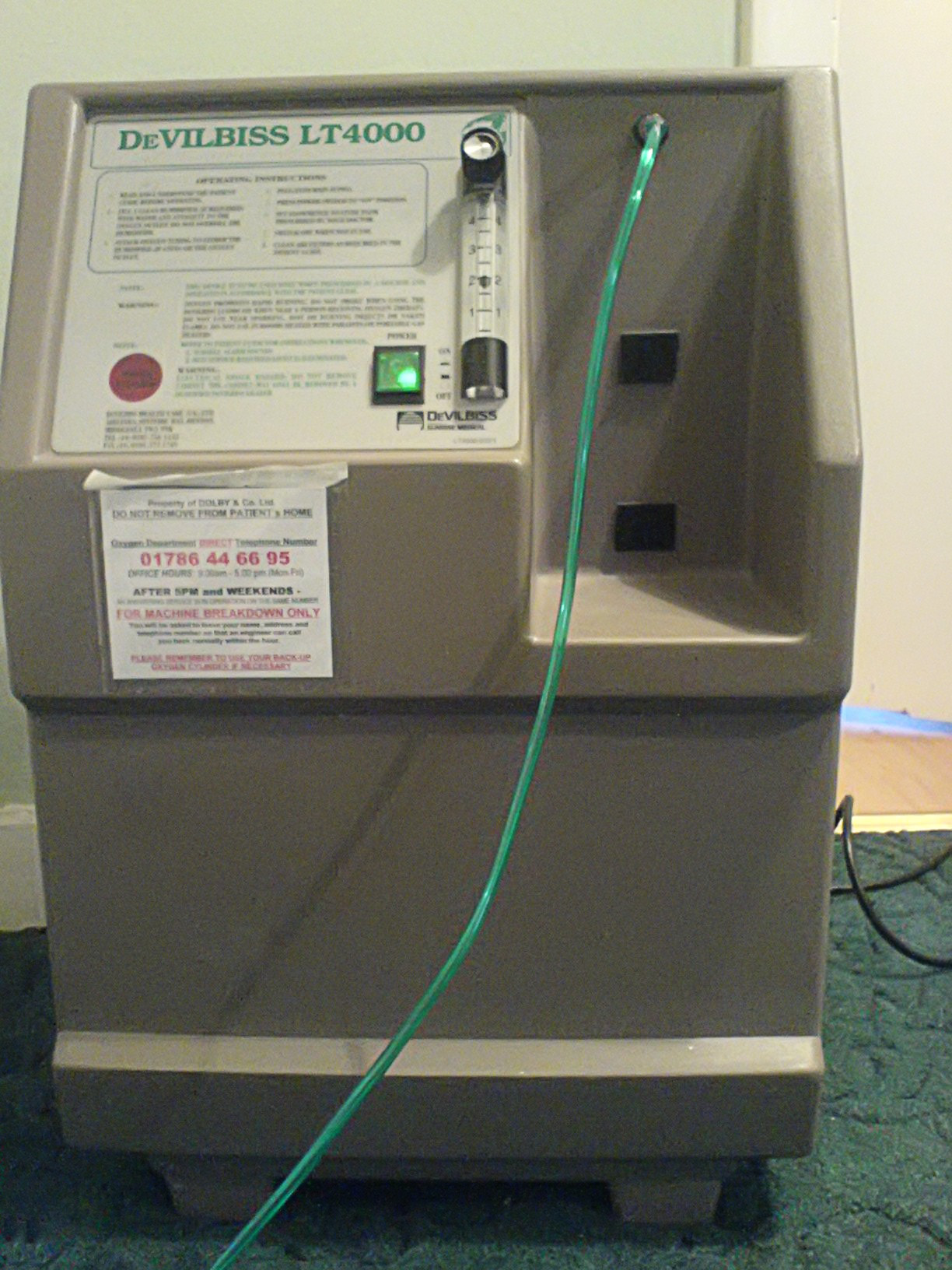
An oxygen concentrator in an emphysema patient's house

Uptake of O_{2} from the air is the essential purpose of respiration, so oxygen supplementation is used in medicine. Treatment not only increases oxygen levels in the patient's blood but has the secondary effect of decreasing resistance to blood flow in many types of diseased lungs, easing work load on the heart. Oxygen therapy is used to treat emphysema, pneumonia, some heart disorders (congestive heart failure), some disorders that cause increased pulmonary artery pressure, and any disease that impairs the body's ability to take up and use gaseous oxygen.

Treatments are flexible enough to be used in hospitals, the patient's home, or increasingly by portable devices. Oxygen tents were once commonly used in oxygen supplementation, but have since been replaced mostly by the use of oxygen masks or nasal cannulas.

Hyperbaric (high-pressure) medicine uses special oxygen chambers to increase the partial pressure of O_{2} around the patient and, when needed, the medical staff. Carbon monoxide poisoning, gas gangrene, and decompression sickness (the 'bends') are sometimes addressed with this therapy. Increased O_{2} concentration in the lungs helps to displace carbon monoxide from the heme group of hemoglobin. Oxygen gas is poisonous to the anaerobic bacteria that cause gas gangrene, so increasing its partial pressure helps kill the bacteria and alleviates gas gangrene. Decompression sickness occurs in divers who decompress too quickly after a dive, resulting in bubbles of inert gas, mostly nitrogen and helium, forming in the blood. Increasing the pressure of O_{2} as soon as possible helps to redissolve the bubbles back into the blood so that these excess gasses can be exhaled naturally through the lungs. Normobaric oxygen administration at the highest available concentration is frequently used as first aid for any diving injury that may involve inert gas bubble formation in the tissues. There is epidemiological support for its use from a statistical study of cases recorded in a long term database.

=== Life support and recreational use ===
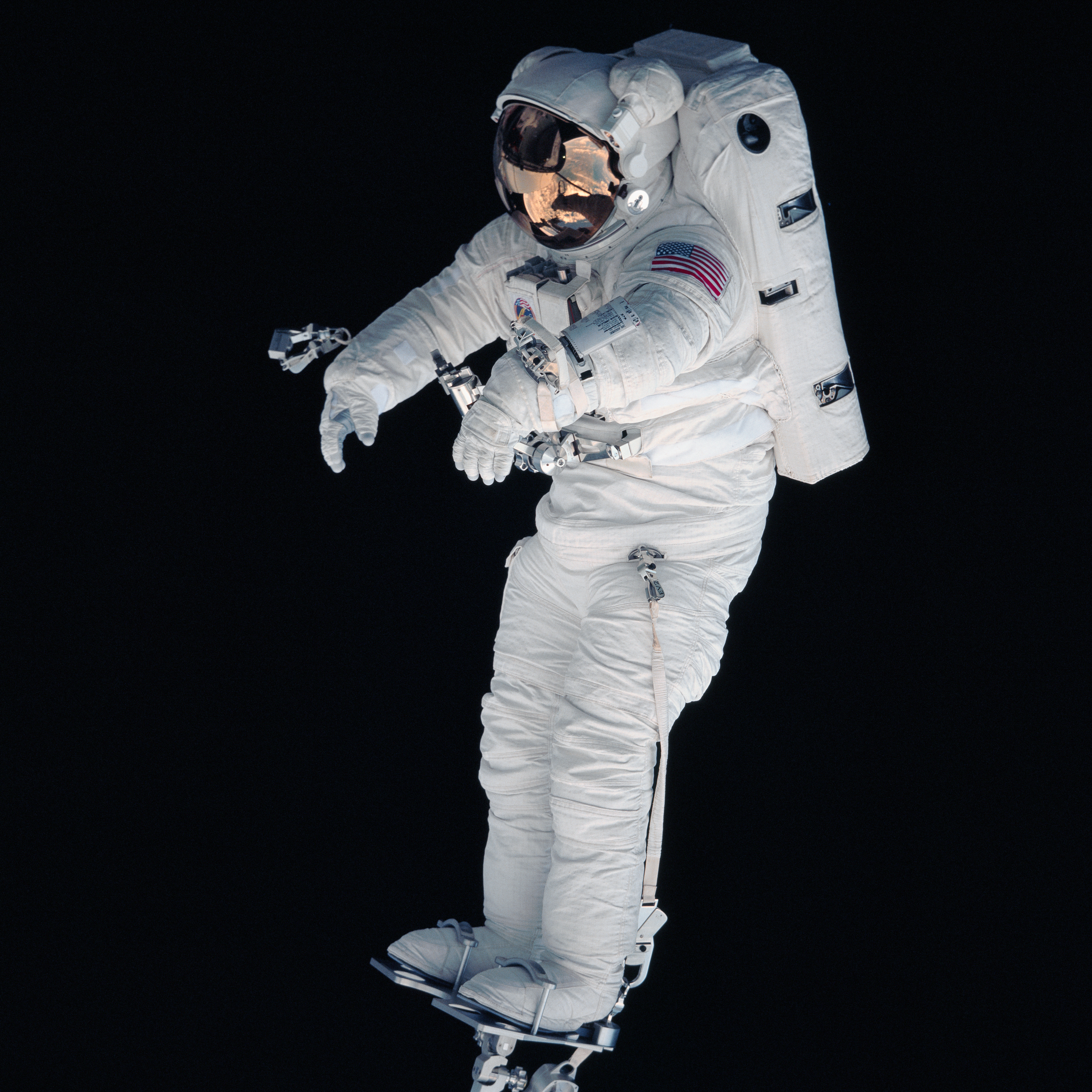
Low-pressure pure O_{2} is used in space suits.

In modern space suits, which surround their occupant's body, oxygen gas is used as a low-pressure breathing gas. These devices use nearly pure oxygen at about one-third normal pressure, resulting in a normal blood partial pressure of O_{2}. This trade-off of higher oxygen concentration for lower pressure is needed to maintain suit flexibility.

Scuba and surface-supplied underwater divers and submarines also rely on artificially delivered O_{2}. Submarines, submersibles, and atmospheric diving suits usually operate at normal atmospheric pressure. Breathing air is scrubbed of carbon dioxide by chemical extraction and oxygen is replaced to maintain a constant partial pressure. Ambient pressure divers breathe air or gas mixtures with an oxygen fraction suited to the operating depth. Pure or nearly pure O_{2} use in diving at pressures higher than atmospheric is usually limited to rebreathers, or decompression at relatively shallow depths (~6 meters depth, or less), or medical treatment in recompression chambers at pressures up to 2.8 bar, where acute oxygen toxicity can be managed without the risk of drowning. Deeper diving requires significant dilution of O_{2} with other gases, such as nitrogen or helium, to prevent oxygen toxicity.

People who climb mountains or fly in non-pressurized fixed-wing aircraft sometimes have supplemental O_{2} supplies. (Note: The reason is that increasing the proportion of oxygen in the breathing gas at low pressure acts to augment the inspired O_{2} partial pressure nearer to that found at sea-level.) Pressurized commercial airplanes have an emergency supply of O_{2} automatically supplied to the passengers in case of cabin depressurization. Sudden cabin pressure loss activates chemical oxygen generators above each seat, causing oxygen masks to drop. Pulling on the masks "to start the flow of oxygen" as cabin safety instructions dictate, forces iron filings into the sodium chlorate inside the canister. A steady stream of oxygen gas is then produced by the exothermic reaction.

Oxygen, as a mild euphoric, has a history of recreational use in oxygen bars and in sports. Oxygen bars are establishments found in the United States since the late 1990s that offer higher than normal O_{2} exposure for a minimal fee. Professional athletes, especially in American football, sometimes go off-field between plays to don oxygen masks to boost performance. The pharmacological effect is doubted; a placebo effect is a more likely explanation. Available studies support a performance boost from oxygen enriched mixtures only if it is inhaled during aerobic exercise.

Other recreational uses that do not involve breathing include pyrotechnic applications, such as George Goble's five-second ignition of barbecue grills.

=== Industrial ===
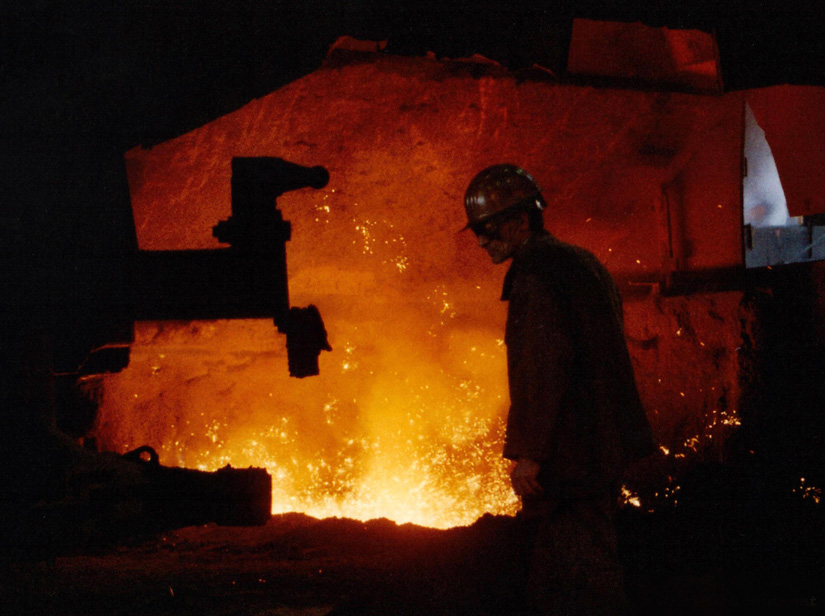
Most commercially produced O_{2} is used to smelt and/or decarburize iron.

Smelting of iron ore into steel consumes 55% of commercially produced oxygen. In this process, O_{2} is injected through a high-pressure lance into molten iron, which removes sulfur impurities and excess carbon as the respective oxides, SO_{2} and CO_{2}. The reactions are exothermic, so the temperature increases to 1,700 °C.

Another 25% of commercially produced oxygen is used by the chemical industry. Ethylene is reacted with O_{2} to create ethylene oxide, which, in turn, is converted into ethylene glycol; the primary feeder material used to manufacture a host of products, including antifreeze and polyester polymers (the precursors of many plastics and fabrics).

Most of the remaining 20% of commercially produced oxygen is used in medical applications, metal cutting and welding, as an oxidizer in rocket fuel, and in water treatment. Oxygen is used in oxyacetylene welding, burning acetylene with O_{2} to produce a very hot flame. In this process, metal up to 60 cm (24 in) thick is first heated with a small oxy-acetylene flame and then quickly cut by a large stream of O_{2}.

== Compounds ==
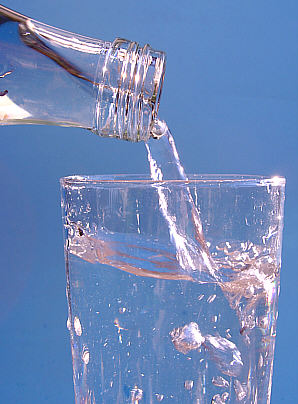
Water (H_{2}O) is the most familiar oxygen compound.

The oxidation state of oxygen is −2 in almost all known compounds of oxygen. The oxidation state −1 is found in a few compounds such as peroxides. Compounds containing oxygen in other oxidation states are very uncommon: −1/2 (superoxides), −1/3 (ozonides), 0 (elemental, hypofluorous acid), +1/2 (dioxygenyl), +1 (dioxygen difluoride), and +2 (oxygen difluoride).

=== Oxides and other inorganic compounds ===
Water (H_{2}O) is an oxide of hydrogen and the most familiar oxygen compound. Hydrogen atoms are covalently bonded to oxygen in a water molecule but also have an additional attraction (about 23.3 kJ/mol per hydrogen atom) to an adjacent oxygen atom in a separate molecule. These hydrogen bonds between water molecules hold them approximately 15% closer than what would be expected in a simple liquid with just van der Waals forces. (Note: Also, since oxygen has a higher electronegativity than hydrogen, the charge difference makes it a polar molecule. The interactions between the different dipoles of each molecule cause a net attraction force.)

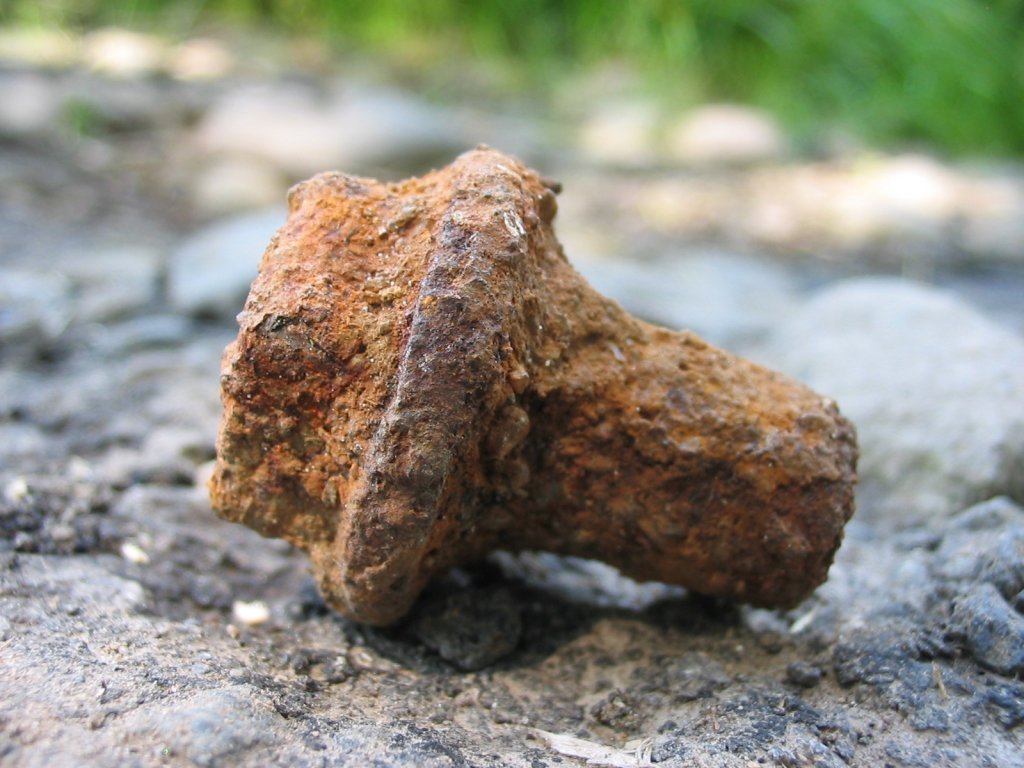
Oxides, such as iron oxide or rust, form when oxygen combines with other elements.

Due to its electronegativity, oxygen forms chemical bonds with almost all other elements to give corresponding oxides. The surface of most metals, such as aluminium and titanium, are oxidized in the presence of air and become coated with a thin film of oxide that passivates the metal and slows further corrosion. Many oxides of the transition metals are non-stoichiometric compounds, with slightly less metal than the chemical formula would show. For example, the mineral FeO (wüstite) is written as $\ce{Fe}_{1-x}\ce{O}$, where x is usually around 0.05.

Oxygen is present in the atmosphere in trace quantities in the form of carbon dioxide (CO_{2}). The Earth's crustal rock is composed in large part of oxides of silicon (silica SiO_{2}, as found in granite and quartz), aluminium (aluminium oxide Al_{2}O_{3}, in bauxite and corundum), iron (iron(III) oxide Fe_{2}O_{3}, in hematite and rust), and calcium carbonate (in limestone). The rest of the Earth's crust is also made of oxygen compounds, in particular various complex silicates (in silicate minerals). The Earth's mantle, of much larger mass than the crust, is largely composed of silicates of magnesium and iron.

Water-soluble silicates in the form of Na_{4}SiO_{4}, Na_{2}SiO_{3}, and Na_{2}Si_{2}O_{5} are used as detergents and adhesives.

Oxygen also acts as a ligand for transition metals, forming transition metal dioxygen complexes, which feature metal–O_{2}. This class of compounds includes the heme proteins hemoglobin and myoglobin. An exotic and unusual reaction occurs with PtF_{6}, which oxidizes oxygen to give O^{+}_{2}PtF^{−}_{6}, dioxygenyl hexafluoroplatinate.

=== Organic compounds ===
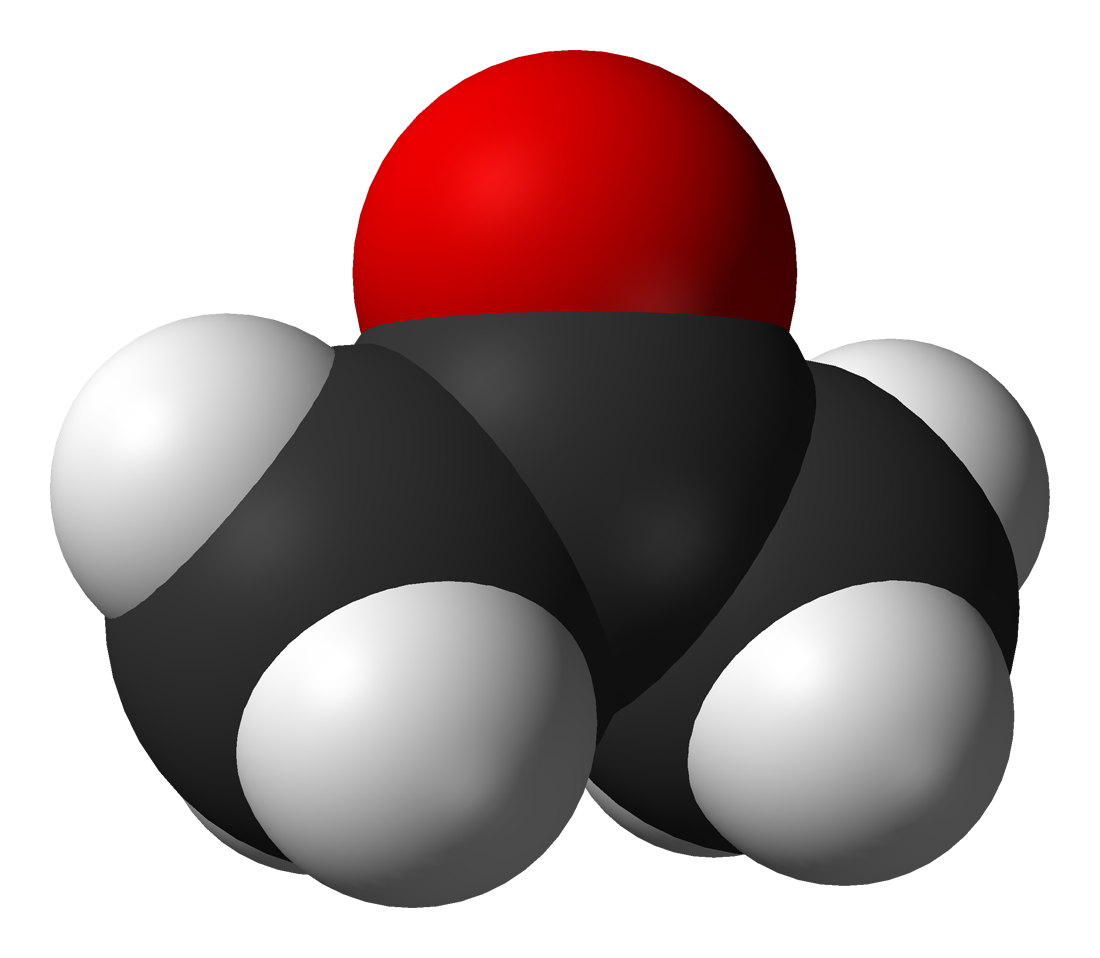
Acetone is an important feeder material in the chemical industry. Oxygen Carbon Hydrogen

Among the most important classes of organic compounds that contain oxygen are (where "R" is an organic group): alcohols (R-OH); ethers (R-O-R); ketones (R-CO-R); aldehydes (R-CO-H); carboxylic acids (R-COOH); esters (R-COO-R); acid anhydrides (R-CO-O-CO-R); and amides (R-CO-NR_{2}). There are many important organic solvents that contain oxygen, including: acetone, methanol, ethanol, isopropanol, furan, THF, diethyl ether, dioxane, ethyl acetate, DMF, DMSO, acetic acid, and formic acid. Acetone ((CH_{3})_{2}CO) and phenol (C_{6}H_{5}OH) are used as feeder materials in the synthesis of many different substances. Other important organic compounds that contain oxygen are: glycerol, formaldehyde, glutaraldehyde, citric acid, acetic anhydride, and acetamide. Epoxides are ethers in which the oxygen atom is part of a ring of three atoms. The element is similarly found in almost all biomolecules that are important to (or generated by) life. Oxygen reacts spontaneously with many organic compounds at or below room temperature in a process called autoxidation. Most of the organic compounds that contain oxygen are not made by direct action of O_{2}. Organic compounds important in industry and commerce that are made by direct oxidation of a precursor include ethylene oxide and peracetic acid.

== Safety and precautions ==
Oxygen
Hazards
- GHS labelling
Pictograms	(GHS03: Oxidizing)
Hazard statements	H272
Precautionary statements	P220, P244, P370+P376, P403
NFPA 704 (fire diamond)	0 0 1 OX

The NFPA 704 standard rates compressed oxygen gas as nonhazardous to health, nonflammable, and nonreactive, but an oxidizer. Refrigerated liquid oxygen (LOX) is given a health hazard rating of 3 (for increased risk of hyperoxia from condensed vapors, and for hazards common to cryogenic liquids such as frostbite), and all other ratings are the same as the compressed gas form.

=== Toxicity ===
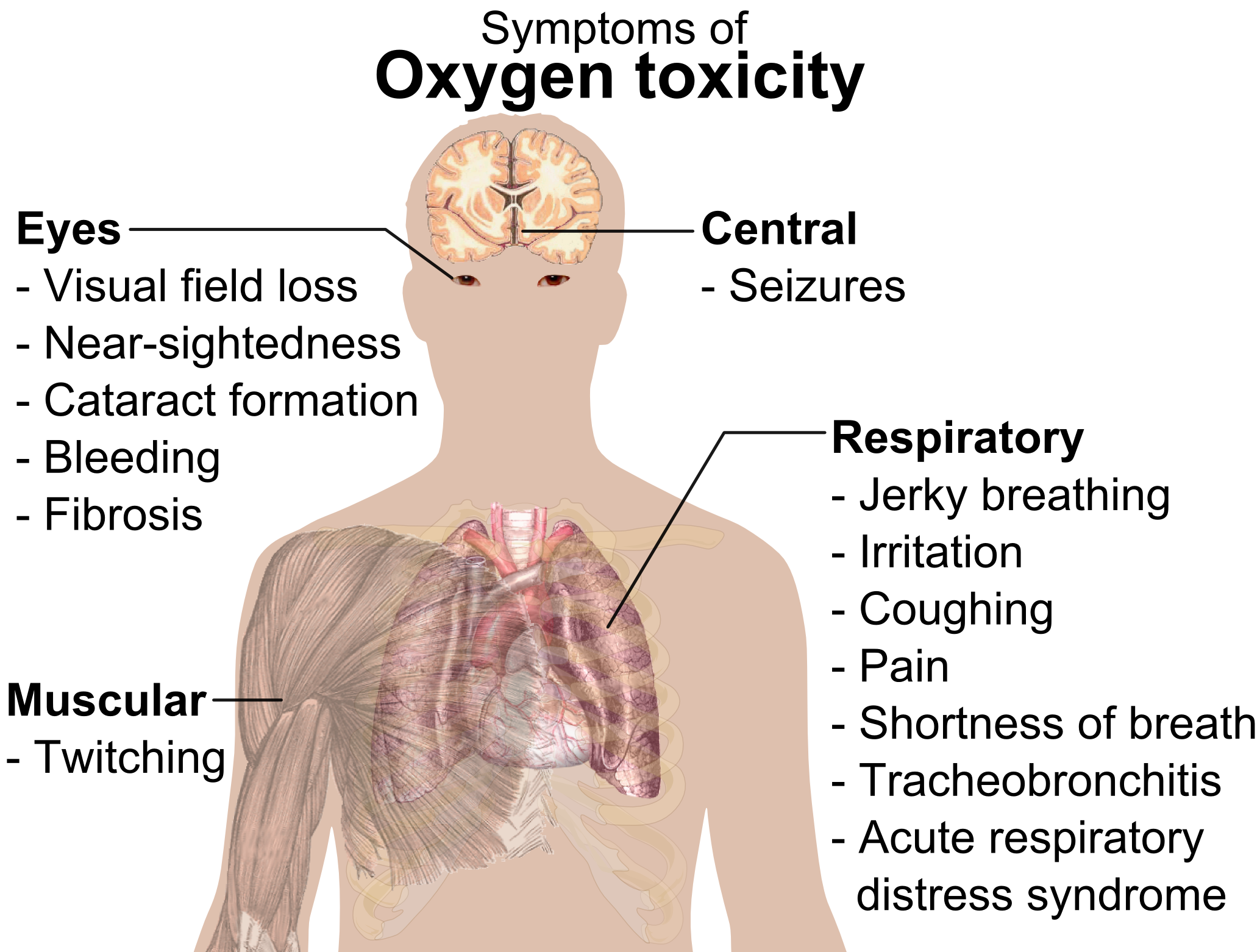
Main symptoms of oxygen toxicity

Oxygen gas (O_{2}) can be toxic at elevated partial pressures, leading to convulsions and other health problems. (Note: Since O_{2}'s partial pressure is the fraction of O_{2} times the total pressure, elevated partial pressures can occur either from high O_{2} fraction in breathing gas or from high breathing gas pressure, or a combination of both.) Oxygen toxicity usually begins to occur at partial pressures more than 50 kilopascals (kPa), equal to about 50% oxygen composition at standard pressure or 2.5 times the normal sea-level O_{2} partial pressure of about 21 kPa. This is not a problem except for patients on mechanical ventilators, since gas supplied through oxygen masks in medical applications is typically composed of only 30–50% O_{2} by volume (about 30 kPa at standard pressure).

At one time, premature babies were placed in incubators containing O_{2}-rich air, but this practice was discontinued after some babies were blinded by the oxygen content being too high.

Breathing pure O_{2} in space applications, such as in some modern space suits or in early spacecraft such as Apollo, causes no damage due to the low total pressures used. In the case of spacesuits, the O_{2} partial pressure in the breathing gas is, in general, about 30 kPa (1.4 times normal), and the resulting O_{2} partial pressure in the astronaut's arterial blood is only marginally more than normal sea-level O_{2} partial pressure.

Oxygen toxicity to the lungs and central nervous system can also occur in deep scuba diving and surface-supplied diving. Prolonged breathing of an air mixture with an O_{2} partial pressure more than 60 kPa can eventually lead to permanent pulmonary fibrosis. Exposure to an O_{2} partial pressure greater than 160 kPa (about 1.6 atm) may lead to convulsions (normally fatal for divers). Acute oxygen toxicity (causing seizures, its most feared effect for divers) can occur by breathing an air mixture with 21% O_{2} at 66 m (217 ft) or more of depth; the same thing can occur by breathing 100% O_{2} at only 6 m (20 ft).

=== Combustion and other hazards ===
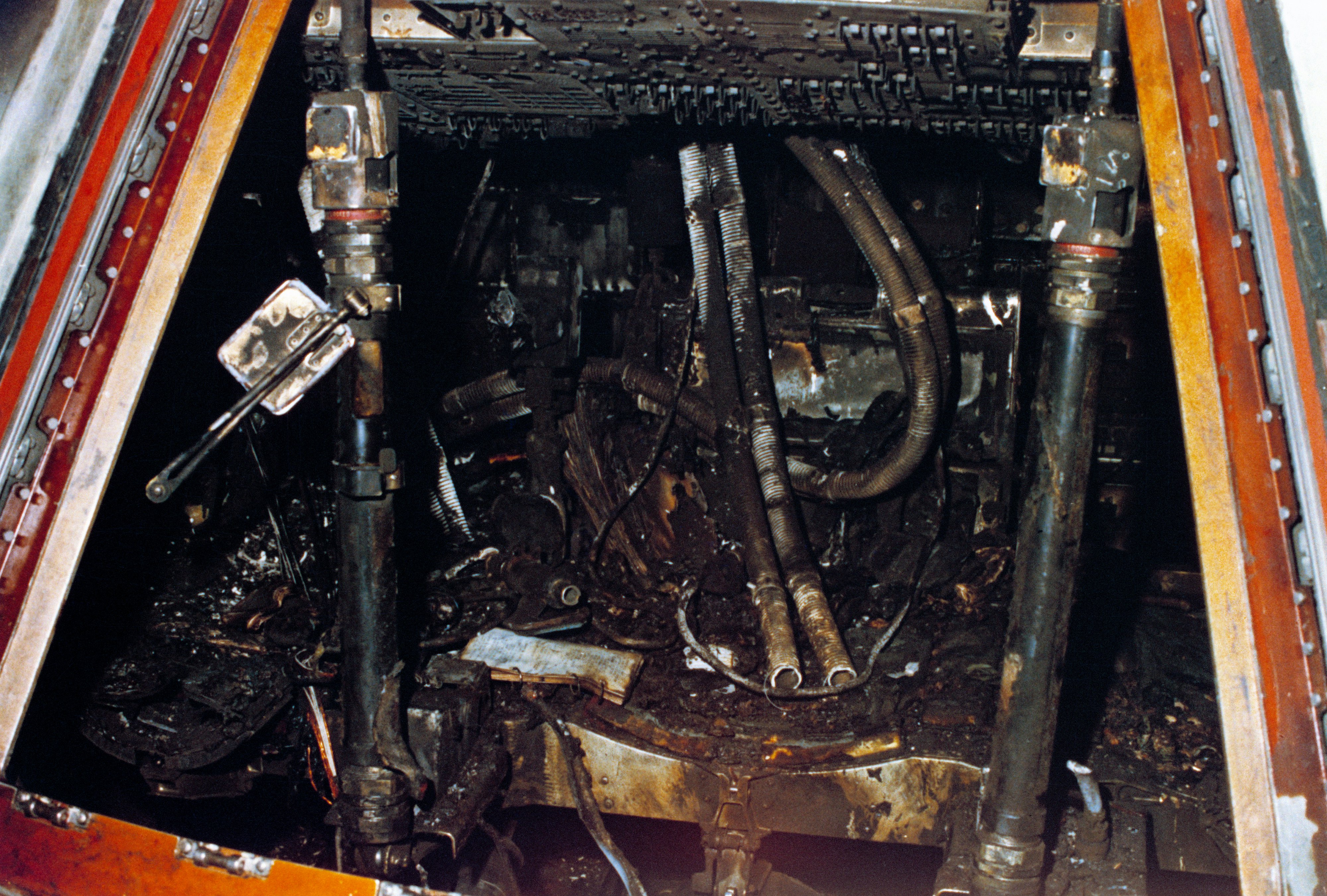
The interior of the Apollo 1 Command Module. Pure O_{2} at higher than normal pressure and a spark led to a fire and the loss of the Apollo 1 crew.

Unless non-flammable containers are used or all sources of ignition are eliminated, oxygen rich environments are extremely hazardous. Many materials including most metals burn faster in oxygen rich environments and ignite at lower temperatures. Concentrated O_{2} will allow combustion to proceed rapidly and energetically. Steel pipes and storage vessels used to store and transmit both gaseous and liquid oxygen will act as a fuel; and therefore the design and manufacture of O_{2} systems requires special training to ensure that ignition sources are minimized.

The 1967 fire that killed the Apollo 1 crew in a launch pad test spread so rapidly because the capsule was pressurized with pure O_{2} at slightly more than atmospheric pressure to force the doors against their seals. Once in space the exterior pressure would be minimal and the oxygen pressure would have been reduced to 5psi to reduce fire hazard. The ignition source for the fire was traced to an electrical surge under the seat of one of the astronauts, probably due to chafed wires.

Liquid oxygen spills, if allowed to soak into organic matter such as wood, petrochemicals, and asphalt, can cause these materials to detonate unpredictably on subsequent mechanical impact.

== See also ==
- Geological history of oxygen
- Hypoxia (environmental) for O_{2} depletion in aquatic ecology
- Ocean deoxygenation
- Hypoxia (medical), a lack of oxygen
- Limiting oxygen concentration
- Oxygen compounds
- Oxygen plant
- Oxygen sensor
- Dark oxygen
