= Self-contained self-rescue device =

Portable oxygen source

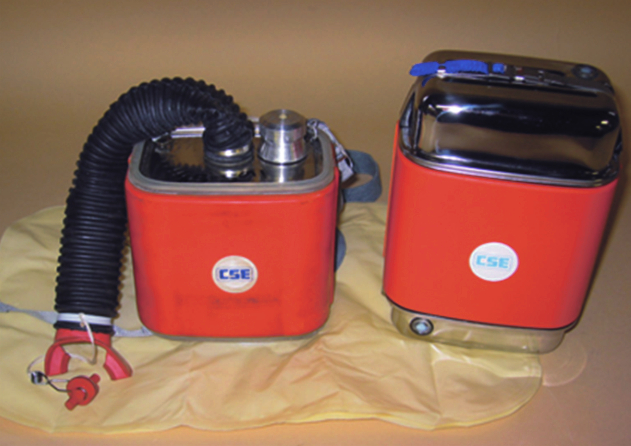
- Two CSE SR-100 SCSRs in the opened (left) and unopened (right) states.
- [edit on Wikidata]

Test bench for a miner's closed circuit self-rescuers

A self-contained self-rescue device, SCSR, self-contained self-rescuer, or air pack is a type of closed-circuit SCBA with a portable oxygen source for providing breathable air when the surrounding atmosphere lacks oxygen or is contaminated with toxic gases, e.g. carbon monoxide.

Self-rescuers are intended for use in environments such as coal mines where there is a risk of fire or explosion, and in a location where no external rescue may be available for some time – the wearer must make their own way to safety, or to some pre-equipped underground refuge. The main hazard here is from large quantities of carbon monoxide or whitedamp, often produced by an explosion of firedamp. In some industries, the hazard may be from anoxic asphyxia, or a lack of oxygen, rather than poisoning by something toxic.

Self-rescuers are small, lightweight belt or harness-worn devices, enclosed in a rugged metal case. They are designed to have a long service life of around 10 years (longer for shelf storage) and to be worn every day by each miner. Once used, they have a working life of a few hours and are discarded after opening.

== Respirators ==
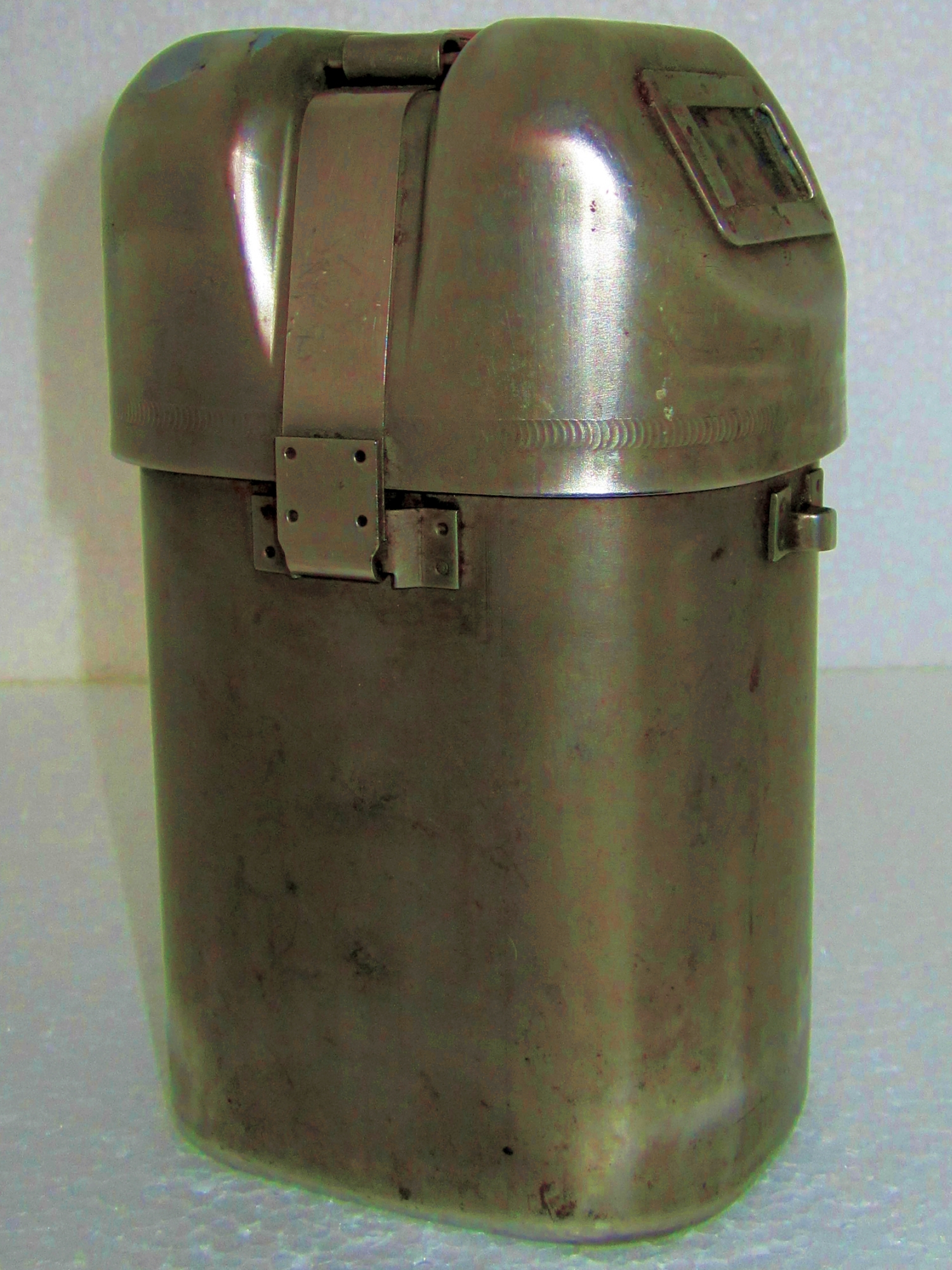
Self-rescue respirator, as carried

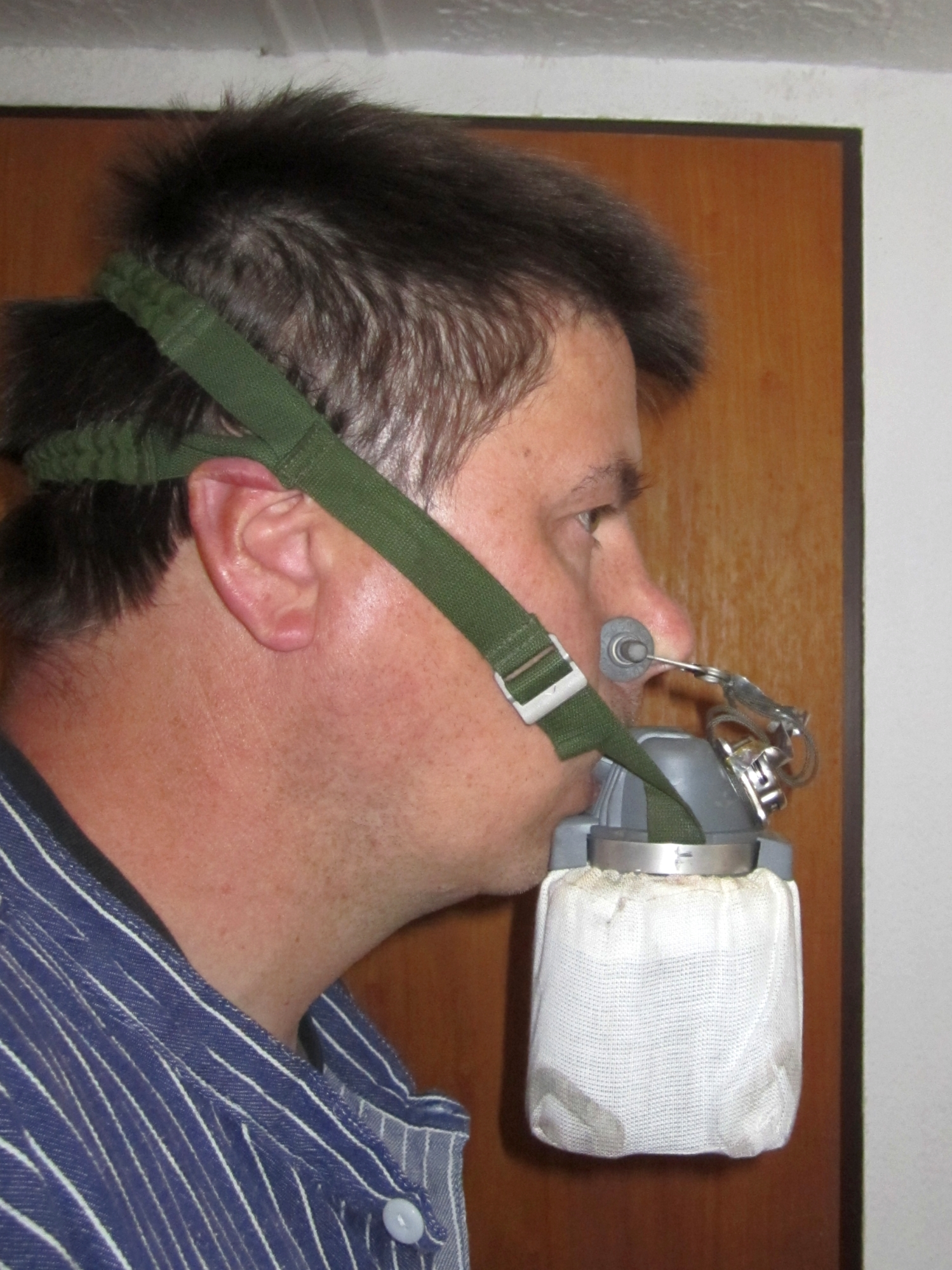
Self-rescue respirator, as worn during use

A respirator's function is to protect against carbon monoxide, as the most likely dangerous gas after a mining fire or explosion. The respirator does this by oxidising the toxic monoxide to less toxic carbon dioxide.

The key feature of a respirator is a reactive catalyst bed, of a material like Hopcalite. This is a mixture of copper and manganese oxides, which acts as an oxidiser. To keep the catalyst functioning, the respirator has pre-filters of a dust filter and a moisture trap, as either contaminant would reduce its effectiveness. For storage, the respirator must be kept sealed within its case to avoid the catalyst activating and becoming consumed. The catalyst reaction is exothermic and so the respirator and its gas gets hot in use. The case is metal, to conduct some of this heat away.

Once in use, the respirator has a working life of around two hours. They are used by holding a mouthpiece in the mouth, with the weight of the respirator taken by a headband. A nose clip keeps the nose shut and all breathing, in and out, must be through the mouth and the respirator. In use, the hot air from the respirator is known to be unpleasant to breathe and careful training is needed to reinforce the need to keep breathing through it, not to breathe cold untreated air from around it – the hotter the respirator exhaust, the higher the carbon monoxide concentration and the more dangerous it would be to breathe otherwise. Exhaled air also passes through the respirator mouthpiece and an exhaust valve, but not the catalyst, as damp exhaled air would affect its efficiency. Respirators may provide a heat exchanger to carry away some of their heat in this exhaled air.

These respirators are not designed to protect against toxic gases other than carbon monoxide. They may have some ability to reduce it, especially if it will be oxidised safely by the catalyst (such as ozone), but this is incidental. They do not contain activated charcoal or similar adsorbent materials, as most respirators do.

A drawback to these respirators is that they rely on atmospheric oxygen in order for the catalyst to oxidise the carbon monoxide. This makes them unusable after some types of accident, and so the oxygen-source rescuer is used instead.

== Oxygen sources ==
A SCSR is usually a closed-circuit breathing apparatus with a chemical oxygen generator or a compressed oxygen cylinder and a carbon dioxide absorber. SCSRs are most commonly used in some coal mines, are intended for one person, and usually supply at least one hour of oxygen. SCSRs are intended to facilitate escape from mines after a fire or explosion. They are also used by people working with machinery on the surface of a mine or pit, in case they become covered by such materials as coal or sand. Usage of SCSRs for other purposes is discouraged.

Oxygen sources have shorter working lifetimes than respirators. The EN 13794 standard for them defines 'Class 30' as offering 30 minutes of breathable oxygen.

Some SCSRs use potassium superoxide as a chemical oxygen source. As their chemical reactions are energetic and exothermic, there is also a fire risk, as with respirators.

== See also ==
- Personal Egress Air Pack – Backup air supplies on the Space Shuttle
