= Oxygen tank =

Storage vessel for oxygen

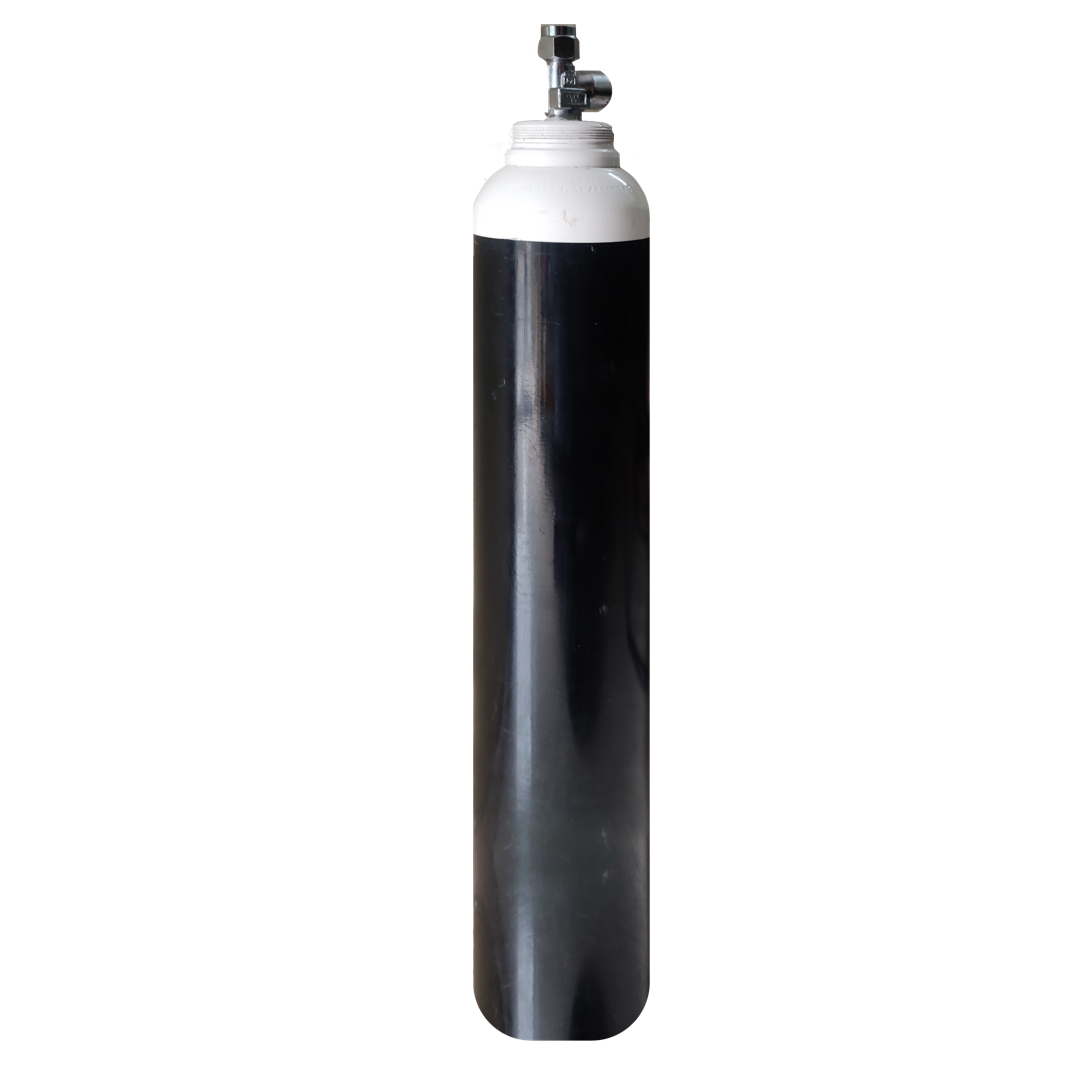
- High pressure oxygen storage cylinder, colloquially referred to as an oxygen tank
- Other names: Oxygen cylinder
- Uses: High pressure storage of oxygen gas

An oxygen tank is an oxygen storage vessel, which is either held under pressure in gas cylinders, referred to in the industry as high pressure oxygen cylinders, or as liquid oxygen in a cryogenic storage tank.

== Uses ==
Oxygen tanks are used to store gas for:

- medical breathing (oxygen therapy) at medical facilities and at home (high pressure cylinder)
- breathing at altitude in aviation, either in a decompression emergency, or constantly (as in unpressurized aircraft), usually in high pressure cylinders
- oxygen first aid sets, in small portable high pressure cylinders
- gas blending, for mixing breathing gases such as nitrox, trimix and heliox
- open-circuit scuba sets - mainly used for accelerated decompression in technical diving, in high pressure cylinders
- some types of diving rebreather: oxygen rebreathers and fully closed circuit rebreathers, usually in high pressure cylinders
- use in climbing, "Bottled oxygen" refers to oxygen in lightweight high pressure cylinders for mountaineering
- industrial processes, including the manufacture of steel and monel
- oxyacetylene welding equipment, glass lampworking torches, and some gas cutting torches, usually in high pressure cylinders
- use as liquid rocket propellants for rocket engines, usually as liquid oxygen at ambient pressure
- athletes, specifically on American football sidelines, to expedite recovery after exertion, in high-pressure cylinders.

Breathing oxygen is delivered from the storage tank to users by use of the following methods: oxygen mask, nasal cannula, full face diving mask, diving helmet, demand valve, oxygen rebreather, built in breathing system (BIBS), oxygen tent, and hyperbaric oxygen chamber.

Contrary to popular belief most scuba divers do not carry oxygen tanks. The vast majority of divers breathe air or nitrox stored in a diving cylinder. A small minority breathe trimix, heliox or other exotic gases. Some may carry pure oxygen for accelerated decompression or as supply gas to a rebreather. Some shallow divers, particularly naval combat divers, use oxygen rebreathers, and they use a small oxygen cylinder to provide the gas.

Oxygen is rarely held at pressures higher than 20 Megapascals (200 bar or 2,900.75 psi}, due to the risks of fire triggered by high temperatures caused by adiabatic heating when the gas changes pressure when moving from one vessel to another. Medical use liquid oxygen airgas tanks are typically 2.4 MPa (350 psi).

All equipment coming into contact with high pressure oxygen must be "oxygen clean" and "oxygen compatible", to reduce the risk of fire. "Oxygen clean" means the removal of any substance that could act as a source of ignition. "Oxygen compatible" means that internal components must not burn readily or degrade easily in a high pressure oxygen environment.

In some countries there are legal and insurance requirements and restrictions on the use, storage and transport of pure oxygen. Oxygen tanks are normally stored in well-ventilated locations, far from potential sources of fire and concentrations of people.

== See also ==
- Bottled gas
- Gas cylinder
- Dewar flask
