= Rubidium permanganate =

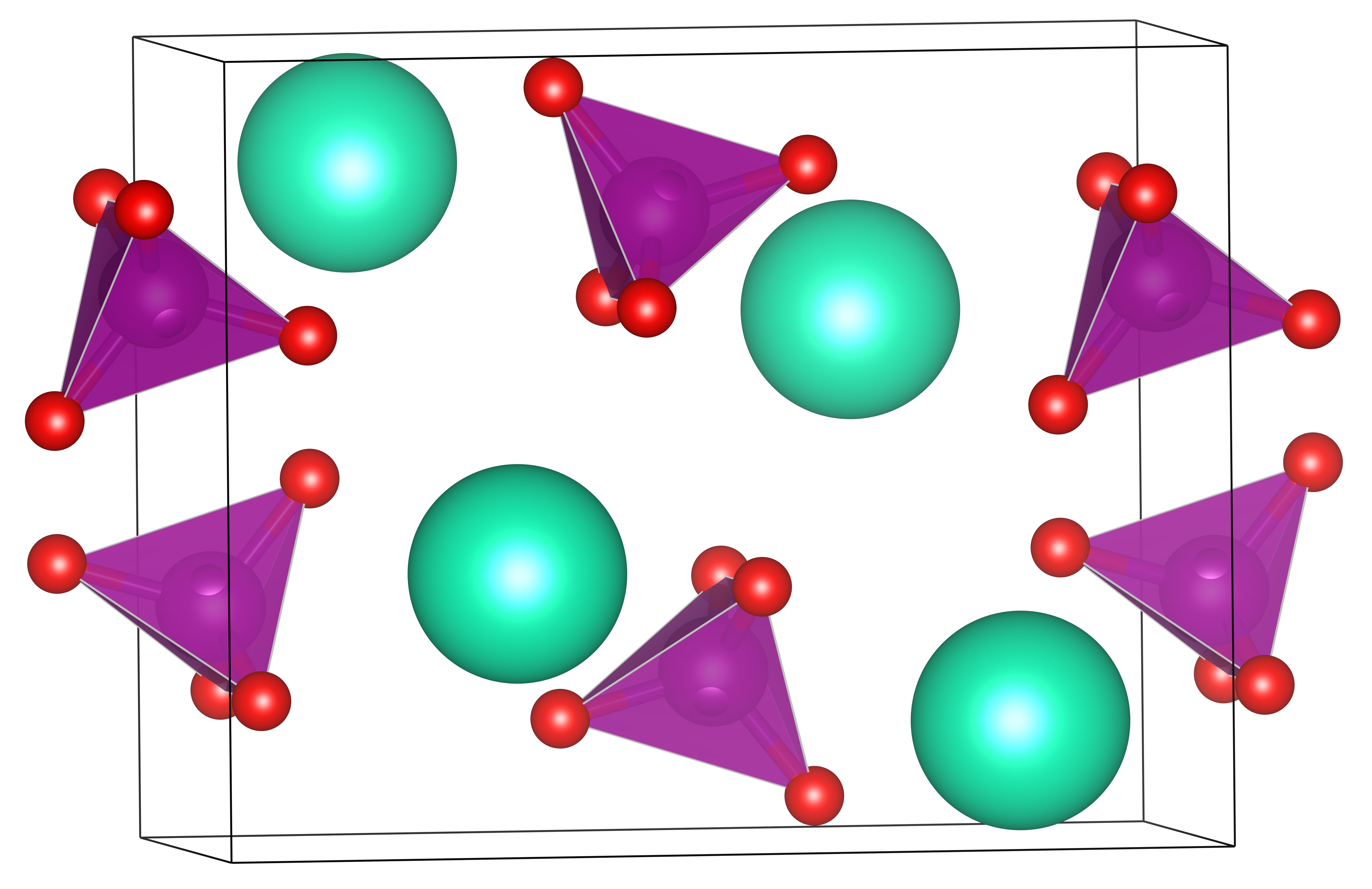

Identifiers
CAS Number	13465-49-1
3D model (JSmol)	Interactive image
ChemSpider	13389592
PubChem CID	23674440
CompTox Dashboard (EPA)	DTXSID00635477
- InChI: InChI=1S/Mn.4O.Rb/q;;;;-1;+1 Key: UJCOPKFKNRFWHO-UHFFFAOYSA-N
- SMILES: [Rb+].[O-][Mn](=O)(=O)=O

Properties
Chemical formula	RbMnO_{4}
Molar mass	204.404
Appearance	purple crystals
Density	3.325 g·cm^{−3}
Melting point	295 °C (decomposes)
Solubility in water	10.6 g/L (19 °C)

Structure
Crystal structure	orthorhombic
Space group	Pnma (Nr. 62)
Lattice constant	a = 954.11 pm, b = 573.926 pm, c = 763.63 pm

Related compounds
Other anions	Rubidium perchlorate Rubidium periodate Rubidium pertechnetate
Other cations	Lithium permanganate Sodium permanganate Potassium permanganate Ammonium permanganate Caesium permanganate
- Except where otherwise noted, data are given for materials in their standard state (at 25 °C [77 °F], 100 kPa). Infobox references

Rubidium permanganate is the permanganate salt of rubidium, with the chemical formula RbMnO_{4}.

== Preparation ==
Rubidium permanganate can be formed by the reaction of potassium permanganate and rubidium chloride:

RbCl + KMnO_{4} → KCl + RbMnO_{4} ↓

== Properties ==
=== Physical ===
Rubidium permanganate is soluble in water with a solubility of 6.03 g/L at 7 °C, 10.6 g/L at 19 °C, and 46.8 g/L at 60 °C. Its crystal structure is orthorhombic, the same as caesium permanganate, ammonium permanganate and potassium permanganate.

=== Chemical ===
Similar to potassium permanganate, the two-step decomposition of rubidium permanganate leads to the formation of rubidium manganate intermediates. It breaks down into manganese dioxide, rubidium oxide and oxygen. The decomposition temperature is between 200 and 300 °C. Drift-away oxygen caused an 8% mass loss in the product.

10RbMnO_{4} → 3Rb_{2}MnO_{4} + 7MnO_{2} + 2Rb_{2}O + 6O_{2} ↑
2Rb_{2}MnO_{4} → 2MnO_{2} + 2Rb_{2}O + O_{2} ↑

Total reaction:

4RbMnO_{4} → 4MnO_{2} + 2Rb_{2}O + 3O_{2} ↑

== Uses ==
In qualitative analysis, rubidium permanganate is used as a reagent to detect perchlorate ions. It is produced as an intermediate from rubidium nitrate and potassium permanganate and precipitates with existing perchlorate ions as RbClO_{4}·RbMnO_{4} mixed crystal.
