= Caesium perchlorate =

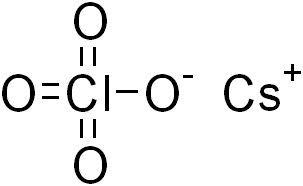

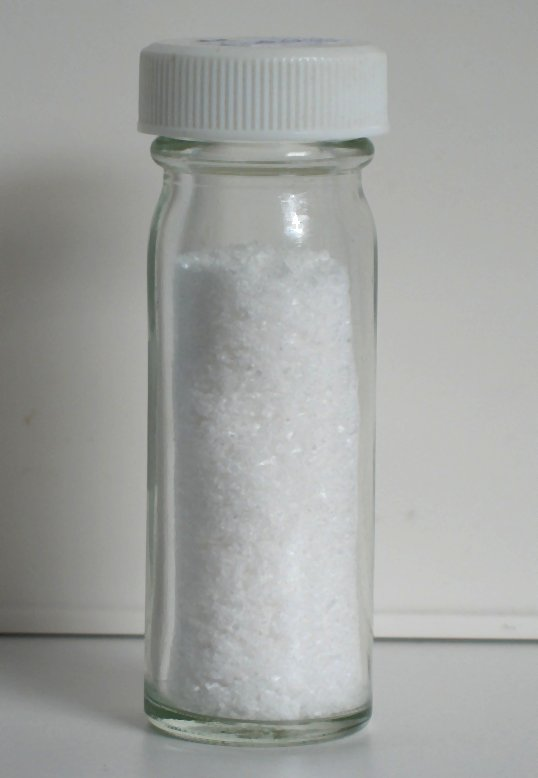

Names
- IUPAC name Caesium perchlorate
- Other names Cesium perchlorate

Identifiers
CAS Number	13454-84-7
3D model (JSmol)	Interactive image
ChemSpider	109912
ECHA InfoCard	100.033.298
EC Number	236-643-0
PubChem CID	123309
CompTox Dashboard (EPA)	DTXSID50884610
- InChI: InChI=1S/ClHO4.Cs/c2-1(3,4)5;/h(H,2,3,4,5);/q;+1/p-1 Key: WKDKOOITVYKILI-UHFFFAOYSA-M; InChI=1/ClHO4.Cs/c2-1(3,4)5;/h(H,2,3,4,5);/q;+1/p-1 Key: WKDKOOITVYKILI-REWHXWOFAB
- SMILES: [Cs+].[O-]Cl(=O)(=O)=O

Properties
Chemical formula	CsClO_{4}
Molar mass	232.36 g/mol
Appearance	Colorless crystals
Density	3.327 g/cm^{3}
Melting point	250 °C (482 °F; 523 K) (decomposes)
Solubility in water	1.974 g/100 ml (25 °C)
Solubility product (K_{sp})	3.95×10^{−3}
Refractive index (n_{D})	1.4887

Structure
Crystal structure	orthorhombic (<219 °C) cubic (>219 °C, a = 798 pm)
Space group	Pnma (<219 °C); F43m (>219 °C)
Lattice constant	a = 982 pm, b = 600 pm, c = 779 pm (orthorhombic, <219 °C)

Hazards
- GHS labelling
Pictograms	(GHS03: Oxidizing) (GHS07: Exclamation mark)
Signal word	Danger
Hazard statements	H271, H272, H302, H315, H319, H332, H335
Precautionary statements	P210, P220, P261, P264, P264+P265, P270, P271, P280, P283, P301+P317, P302+P352, P304+P340, P305+P351+P338, P306+P360, P317, P319, P321, P330, P332+P317, P337+P317, P362+P364, P370+P378, P371+P380+P375, P403+P233, P405, P420, P501
Flash point	Non-flammable
Safety data sheet (SDS)	External MSDS

Related compounds
Other anions	Caesium chloride Caesium chlorate
Other cations	Lithium perchlorate Sodium perchlorate Potassium perchlorate Rubidium perchlorate
- Except where otherwise noted, data are given for materials in their standard state (at 25 °C [77 °F], 100 kPa). verify (what is ?) Infobox references

Caesium perchlorate or cesium perchlorate (CsClO_{4}), is a perchlorate of caesium. It forms white crystals, which are sparingly soluble in cold water and ethanol. It dissolves more easily in hot water.

CsClO_{4} is the second least soluble of the alkali metal perchlorates (after Fr, followed by Rb, K, Li, and Na), a property which may be used for separatory purposes and even for gravimetric analysis. This low solubility played an important role in the characterization of francium as an alkali metal, as francium perchlorate coprecipitates with caesium perchlorate.

Table of solubility in water
Temperature (°C)	0	8.5	14	25	40	50	60	70	99
Solubility (g / 100 ml)	0.8	0.91	1.91	1.974	3.694	5.47	7.30	9.79	28.57

When heated, CsClO_{4} decomposes to caesium chloride above 250 °C. Like all perchlorates, it is a strong oxidant and may react violently with reducing agents and organic materials, especially at elevated temperatures.
