= Caesium permanganate =

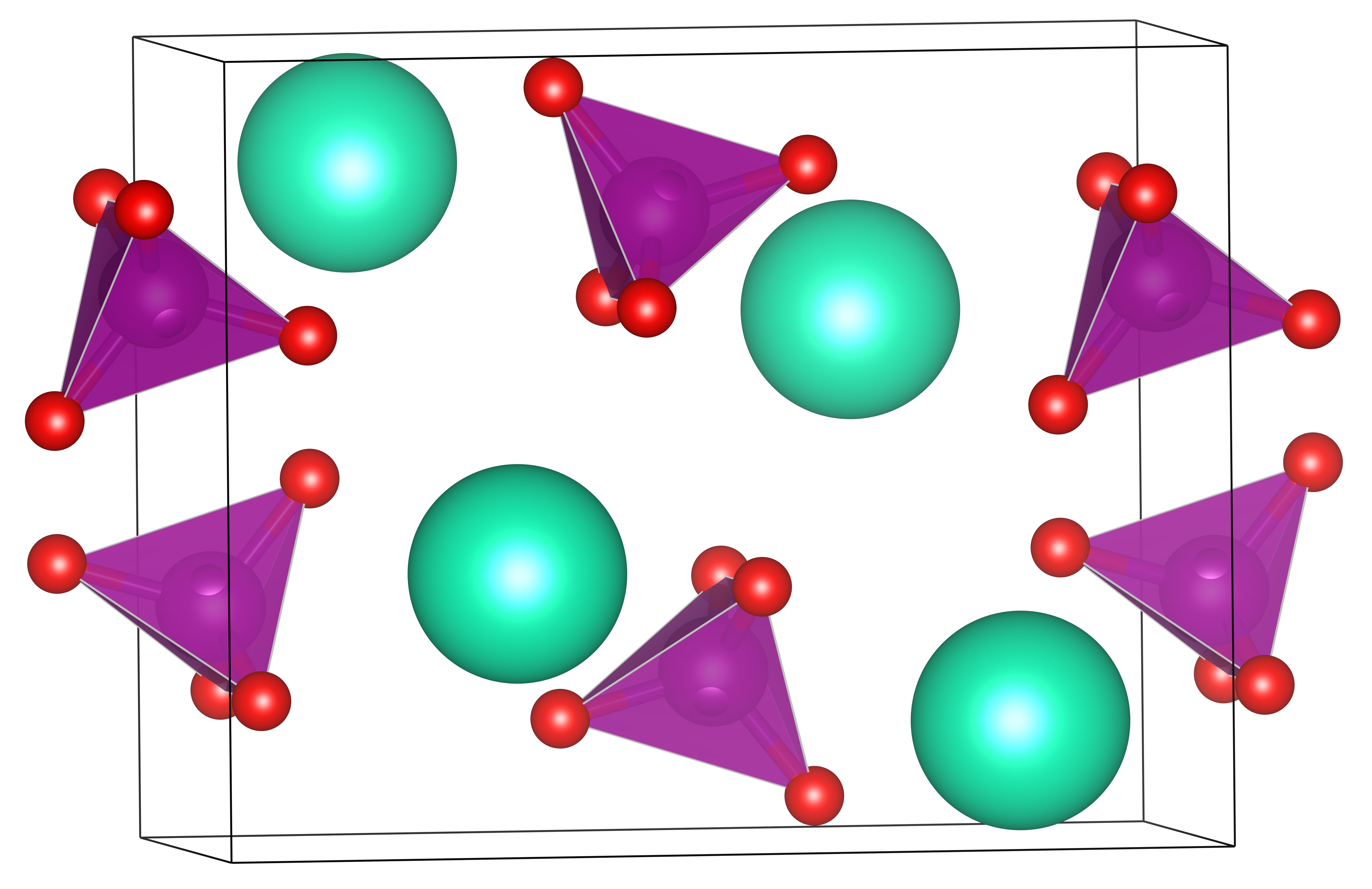

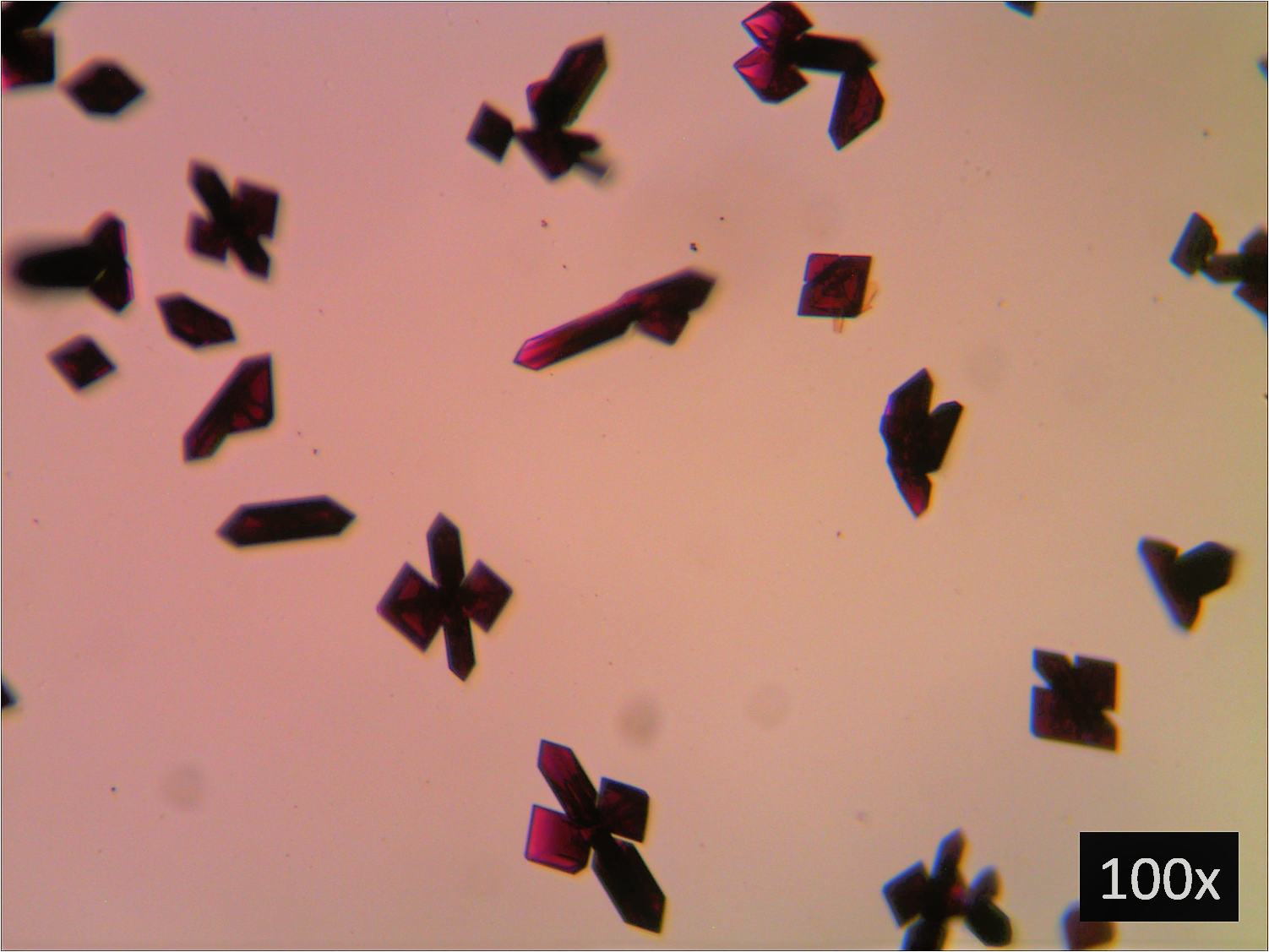

Names
- Other names: Cesium permanganate

Identifiers
CAS Number	13456-28-5
3D model (JSmol)	Interactive image
ChemSpider	13198341
ECHA InfoCard	100.151.587
EC Number	622-853-3
PubChem CID	23674960
- InChI: InChI=1S/Cs.Mn.4O/q+1;;;;;-1 Key: HAHSACJTONBJGG-UHFFFAOYSA-N
- SMILES: [Cs+].[O-][Mn](=O)(=O)=O

Properties
Chemical formula	CsMnO_{4}
Molar mass	251.8406
Appearance	purple powder, bronze crystals
Density	3.6
Melting point	200-300 °C (decomposes)
Solubility in water	2.3 g·l^{−1} (19 °C)

Structure
Crystal structure	orthorhombic
Space group	Pnma (Nr. 62)
Lattice constant	a = 1006 pm, b = 580.1 pm, c = 794.4 pm

Related compounds
Other anions	caesium perchlorate caesium periodate caesium pertechnetate
Other cations	lithium permanganate sodium permanganate potassium permanganate rubidium permanganate ammonium permanganate
- Except where otherwise noted, data are given for materials in their standard state (at 25 °C [77 °F], 100 kPa). Infobox references

Caesium permanganate is the permanganate salt of caesium, with the chemical formula CsMnO_{4}.

== Preparation ==
Caesium permanganate can be formed by the reaction of potassium permanganate and caesium chloride in aqueous solution, followed by concentrating the solution.

CsCl + KMnO_{4} → KCl + CsMnO_{4}

== Properties ==
=== Physical ===
It solubility in water is low: 0.97 g/L at 1 °C, 2.3 g/L at 19 °C, and 12.5 g/L at 59 °C. Its crystal structure is orthorhombic, the same as rubidium permanganate, ammonium permanganate and potassium permanganate.

=== Thermal degradation ===
Similar to the behavior of potassium permanganate, the two-step decomposition of caesium permanganate leads to caesium manganate, which further breaks down into manganese dioxide, caesium oxide, and oxygen. The decomposition temperature is between 200 and 300 °C. Drift-away oxygen caused an 8% mass loss in the product.

10CsMnO_{4} → 3Cs_{2}MnO_{4} + 7MnO_{2} + 2Cs_{2}O + 6O_{2}
2Cs_{2}MnO_{4} → 2MnO_{2} + 2Cs_{2}O + O_{2}

Total reaction:

4CsMnO_{4} → 4MnO_{2} + 2Cs_{2}O + 3O_{2}
