= Sodium perchlorate =

- Sodium perchlorte

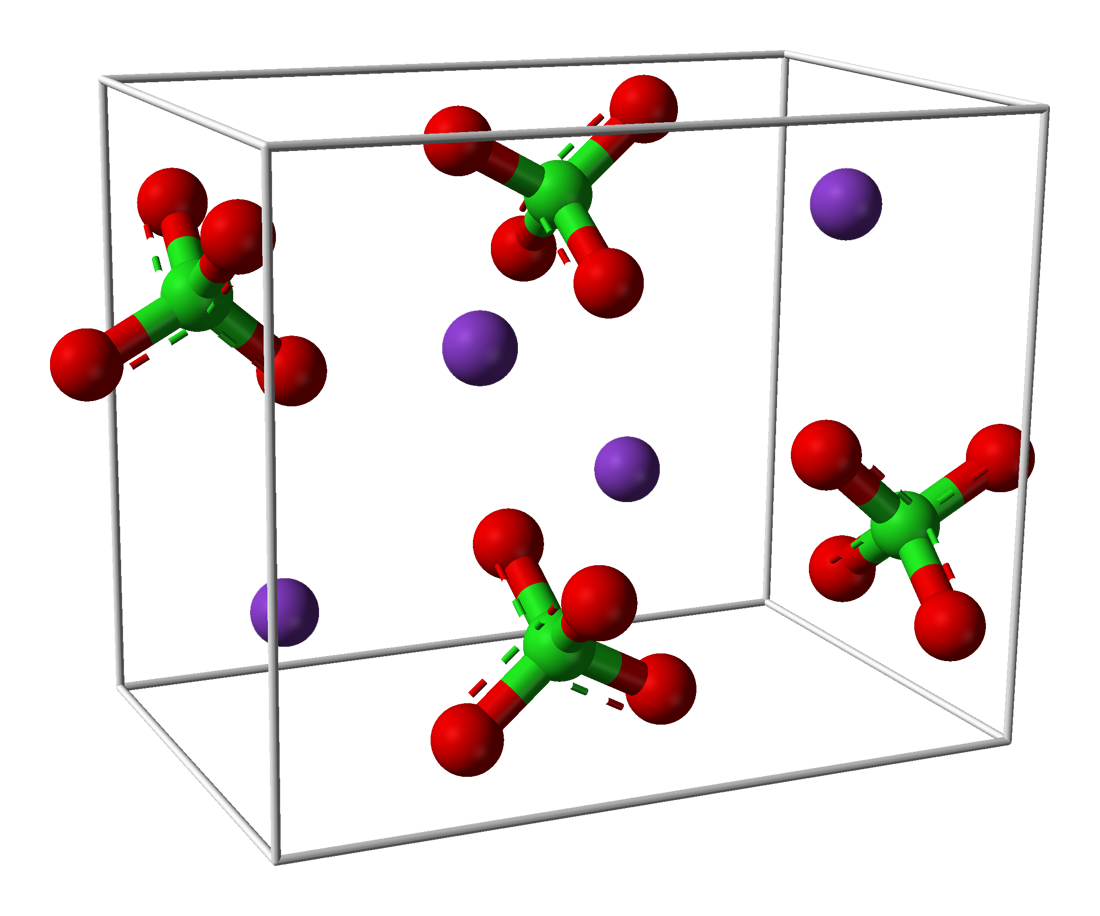

Names
- Other names: Perchloric acid, sodium salt; Sodium chlorate(VII); Sodium hyperchlorate

Identifiers
CAS Number	7601-89-0
3D model (JSmol)	Interactive image
ChEBI	CHEBI:132103
ChEMBL	ChEMBL1644700
ChemSpider	22668
ECHA InfoCard	100.028.647
EC Number	231-511-9
PubChem CID	522606
RTECS number	SC9800000
UNII	97F4MTY3VA
UN number	1502
CompTox Dashboard (EPA)	DTXSID1034185
- InChI: InChI=1S/ClHO4.Na/c2-1(3,4)5;/h(H,2,3,4,5);/q;+1/p-1 Key: BAZAXWOYCMUHIX-UHFFFAOYSA-M; InChI=1/ClHO4.Na/c2-1(3,4)5;/h(H,2,3,4,5);/q;+1/p-1 Key: BAZAXWOYCMUHIX-REWHXWOFAU
- SMILES: [Na+].[O-]Cl(=O)(=O)=O

Properties
Chemical formula	NaClO_{4} (anhydrous); NaClO_{4}·H_{2}O (monohydrate)
Molar mass	122.44 g/mol (anhydrous); 140.45 g/mol (monohydrate)
Appearance	White crystalline solid
Density	2.4994 g/cm^{3} (anhydrous); 2.02 g/cm^{3} (monohydrate)
Melting point	468 °C (874 °F; 741 K) (decomposes, anhydrous); 130 °C (monohydrate)
Boiling point	482 °C (900 °F; 755 K) (decomposes, monohydrate)
Solubility in water	209.6 g/(100 mL) (25 °C, anhydrous); 209 g/(100 mL) (15 °C, monohydrate)
Refractive index (n_{D})	1.4617

Structure
Crystal structure	orthorhombic

Thermochemistry
Std enthalpy of formation (Δ_{f}H^{⦵}_{298})	−382.75 kJ/mol

Hazards
- GHS labelling
Pictograms	(GHS03: Oxidizing) (GHS07: Exclamation mark) (GHS08: Health hazard)
Signal word	Danger
Hazard statements	H271, H302, H319, H373
Precautionary statements	P102, P220, P305+P351+P338, P338
NFPA 704 (fire diamond)	2 0 1 OX
Flash point	400 °C (752 °F; 673 K)
Safety data sheet (SDS)	ICSC 0715

Related compounds
Other anions	Sodium chloride; Sodium hypochlorite; Sodium chlorite; Sodium chlorate
Other cations	Lithium perchlorate; Potassium perchlorate; Rubidium perchlorate; Caesium perchlorate; Ammonium perchlorate
Related compounds	Perchloric acid
- Except where otherwise noted, data are given for materials in their standard state (at 25 °C [77 °F], 100 kPa). verify (what is ?) Infobox references

Sodium perchlorate is an inorganic compound with the chemical formula NaClO_{4}. It consists of sodium cations Na^{+} and perchlorate anions ClO^{−}_{4}. It is a white crystalline, hygroscopic solid that is highly soluble in water and ethanol. It is usually encountered as sodium perchlorate monohydrate NaClO_{4}·H_{2}O. The compound is noteworthy as the most water-soluble of the common perchlorate salts.

Sodium perchlorate and other perchlorates have been found on the planet Mars, having first been detected by the NASA probe Phoenix in 2009. This was later confirmed by spectral analysis by the Mars Reconnaissance Orbiter in 2015 of what is thought to be brine seeps which may be the first evidence of flowing liquid water containing hydrated salts on Mars.

== Selected properties ==
Its heat of formation is −382.75 kJ/mol, i.e. it is thermally stable up to high temperatures. At 490 °C it undergoes thermal decomposition, producing sodium chloride and dioxygen. It crystallizes in the rhombic crystal system.

== Uses ==
Perchloric acid is made by treating NaClO_{4} with HCl. Ammonium perchlorate and potassium perchlorate, of interest in rocketry and pyrotechnics, are prepared by double decomposition from a solution of sodium perchlorate and ammonium chloride or potassium chloride, respectively.

=== Laboratory applications ===
Because of its high solubility (2096 g/L at 25 °C) and the inert behaviour of dissolved perchlorate, solutions of NaClO_{4} are often used as unreactive background electrolyte (supporting electrolyte). Indeed, because the reduction reaction of perchlorate is kinetically limited even if it is a thermodynamically unstable compound, perchlorate is a redox non-sensitive anion. It is also a non-complexing anion with a fairly low ligand binding capacity.

In the past perchlorates were quite widely used in the synthesis of coordination compounds because their larger size (compared to halides) and excellent hydrogen bonding abilities made them highly effective counter-ions for complexes with ammine, aquo and halido ligands, often yielding highly crystalline products. However because of the hazards (see Safety Section below) associated with their use they have been largely superseded in most labs by much less risky counterions like fluoroborate (BF_{4}^{–}, PF_{6}^{–}) and related anions.

Sodium perchlorate is the precursor to ammonium, potassium and lithium perchlorate salts, often taking advantage of their low solubility in water relative to NaClO_{4} (209 g/(100 mL) at 25 °C).

It is used for denaturating proteins in biochemistry and in standard DNA extraction and hybridization reactions in molecular biology.

=== In medicine ===
Sodium perchlorate can be used to block iodine uptake before administration of iodinated contrast agents in patients with subclinical hyperthyroidism (suppressed TSH).

== Production ==
Sodium perchlorate is produced by anodic oxidation of sodium chlorate (NaClO_{3}) at an inert electrode, such as platinum.

Na^{+}ClO^{−}_{3} + H_{2}O → Na^{+}ClO^{−}_{4} + 2 H^{+} + 2 e^{−} (acidic medium)
Na^{+}ClO^{−}_{3} + 2 OH^{−} → Na^{+}ClO^{−}_{4} + H_{2}O + 2 e^{−} (alkaline medium)

== Safety ==
All perchlorates are potent oxidisers. When mixed with organic compounds or powdered metals like aluminum, extreme combustion reactions can result, hence the use of such materials in fireworks, low tech rocket propellants and improvised explosives. Because of their kinetic inertness mixtures of perchlorate with organic compounds or powdered metals do not ignite/detonate spontaneously and are shock insensitive.

=== Acute toxicity ===
The median lethal dose (LD_{50}) is 2 – 4 g/kg (rabbits, oral).

=== Chronic toxicity ===
The frequent consumption of drinking water with low concentrations (in the range of μg/L, ppb) of perchlorate is harmful for the thyroid gland as the perchlorate anion competes with the uptake of iodide severely disrupting thyroid function.

=== Environmental effects ===
Perchlorate anions are regarded as persistent pollutants that can cause long term contamination of drinking water and NaClO_{4}'s high solubility makes it highly mobile in the environment. Significant concerns have been raised about the environmental impacts of perchlorates because of its ability to disrupt iodide uptake and metabolism.

== See also ==
- Potassium perchlorate
