= Chlorate reductase =

chlorate reductase

Identifiers
- EC no.: 1.97.1.1
- CAS no.: 60382-73-2

Databases
- IntEnz: IntEnz view
- BRENDA: BRENDA entry
- ExPASy: NiceZyme view
- KEGG: KEGG entry
- MetaCyc: metabolic pathway
- PRIAM: profile
- PDB structures: RCSB PDB PDBe PDBsum
- Gene Ontology: AmiGO / QuickGO
Search
- PMC: articles
- PubMed: articles
- NCBI: proteins

In enzymology, a chlorate reductase (EC 1.97.1.1) is an enzyme that catalyzes the chemical reaction

AH_{2} + chlorate $\rightleftharpoons$ A + H_{2}O + chlorite

Thus, the two substrates of this enzyme are a reduced electron acceptor (denoted AH_{2}) and chlorate, whereas its 3 products are an oxidized electron acceptor (denoted A), water, and chlorite. It is closely related to the enzyme perchlorate reductase which reduces both chlorate and perchlorate.

This enzyme belongs to the family of oxidoreductases. The systematic name of this enzyme class is chlorite:acceptor oxidoreductase. This enzyme is also called chlorate reductase C.
