= Methyl chlorate =

Chemical compound

Names
- IUPAC name methyl chlorate
- Other names Choric Acid, Methyl Ester

Identifiers
CAS Number	91589-75-2
3D model (JSmol)	Interactive image
Abbreviations	MeClO_{3}
PubChem CID	18695386
CompTox Dashboard (EPA)	DTXSID10595654
- InChI: InChI=1S/CH3ClO3/c1-5-2(3)4/h1H3 Key: NHNMRJSHULPMIM-UHFFFAOYSA-N
- SMILES: COCl(=O)=O

Properties
Chemical formula	CH_{3}ClO_{3}
Molar mass	98.48 g·mol^{−1}
log P	0.42
- Except where otherwise noted, data are given for materials in their standard state (at 25 °C [77 °F], 100 kPa). Infobox references

Methyl chlorate is a hypothetical organic compound having a chemical formula CH_{3}ClO_{3}. It would be a methyl ester of chloric acid if it existed. Attempts to synthesize it have failed. No physical properties are known.

== See also ==
- Methyl perchlorate
