= Ammonium perchlorate =

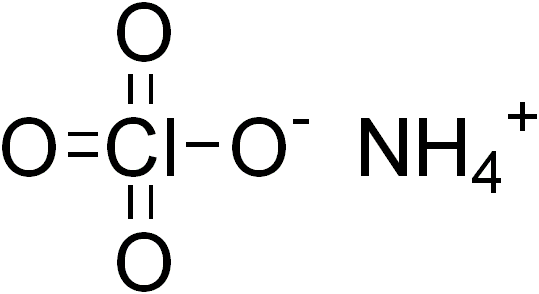
- Ammonium perchlorate

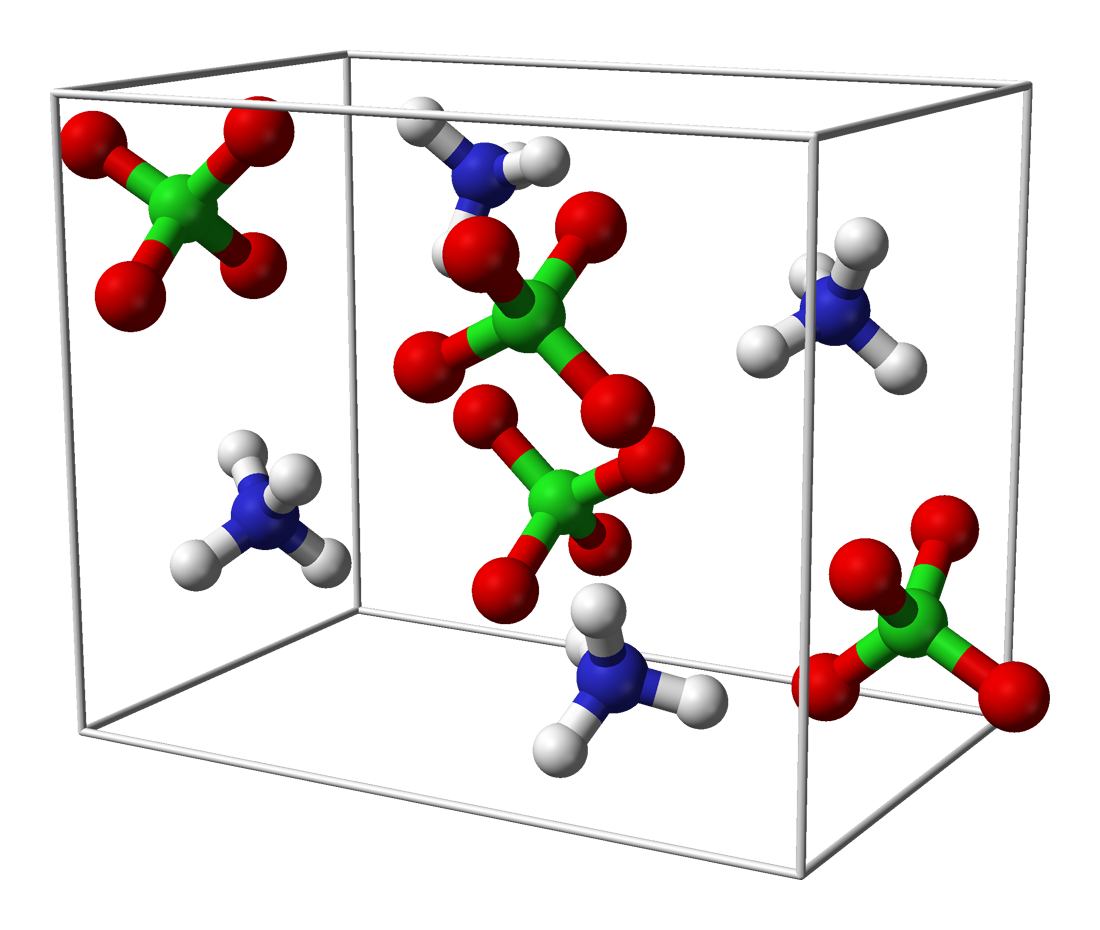
- Unit cell of the crystal structure

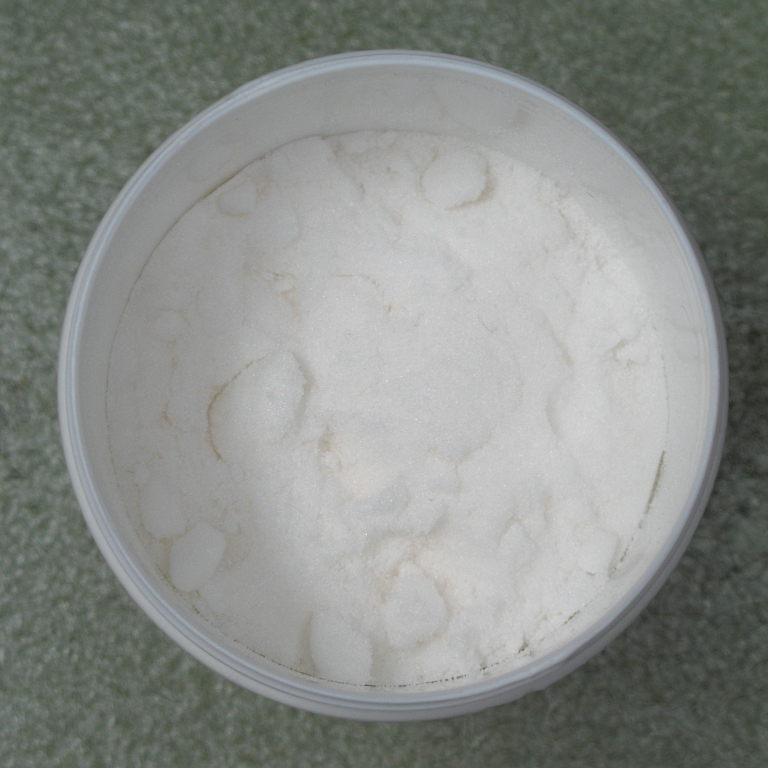

Names
- IUPAC name Ammonium perchlorate
- Other names AP

Identifiers
CAS Number	7790-98-9
3D model (JSmol)	Interactive image
ChemSpider	23041
ECHA InfoCard	100.029.305
EC Number	232-235-1
PubChem CID	24639
RTECS number	SC7520000
UNII	Z3DQ8VD57X
UN number	1442
CompTox Dashboard (EPA)	DTXSID4024515
- InChI: InChI=1S/ClHO4.H3N/c2-1(3,4)5;/h(H,2,3,4,5);1H3 Key: HHEFNVCDPLQQTP-UHFFFAOYSA-N; InChI=1/ClHO4.H3N/c2-1(3,4)5;/h(H,2,3,4,5);1H3 Key: HHEFNVCDPLQQTP-UHFFFAOYAD
- SMILES: [O-]Cl(=O)(=O)=O.[NH4+]

Properties
Chemical formula	NH_{4}ClO_{4}
Molar mass	117.49 g·mol^{-1}
Appearance	White crystalline
Density	1.95 g/cm^{3}
Melting point	Exothermic decomposition before melting at >200 °C
Solubility in water	11.56 g/100 mL (0 °C); 20.85 g/100 mL (20 °C); 57.01 g/100 mL (100 °C)
Solubility	Soluble in methanol Partially soluble in acetone, ethanol Insoluble in diethyl ether

Structure
Crystal structure	Orthorhombic (<240 °C); Cubic (>240 °C)

Thermochemistry
Std enthalpy of formation (Δ_{f}H^{⦵}_{298})	−295.77 kJ/mol

Hazards
- GHS labelling
Pictograms	(GHS01: Explosive) (GHS03: Oxidizing) (GHS07: Exclamation mark) (GHS08: Health hazard)
Signal word	Danger
Hazard statements	H201, H271, H319, H373
Precautionary statements	P210, P220, P221, P230, P240, P250, P260, P264, P280, P283, P305+P351+P338, P306+P360, P314, P337+P313, P370+P378, P370+P380, P371+P380+P375, P372, P373, P401, P501
NFPA 704 (fire diamond)	2 0 4 OX
Safety data sheet (SDS)	Sigma-Aldrich SDS

Related compounds
Other anions	Ammonium chloride Ammonium chlorate Ammonium perbromate
Other cations	Lithium perchlorate Sodium perchlorate Potassium perchlorate Hydronium perchlorate
Related compounds	Perchloric acid
- Except where otherwise noted, data are given for materials in their standard state (at 25 °C [77 °F], 100 kPa). verify (what is ?) Infobox references

Ammonium perchlorate ("AP") is an inorganic compound with the formula NH_{4}ClO_{4}. It is a colorless or white solid that is soluble in water. It is a powerful oxidizer and a major component of ammonium perchlorate composite propellant. Its instability has involved it in accidents such as the PEPCON disaster, and has been suspected as the cause of the Port of Shahid Rajaee explosion.

== Production ==
Ammonium perchlorate (AP) is produced by reaction between ammonia and perchloric acid.

NH_{3} + HClO_{4} → [NH_{4}]ClO_{4}

This process is the main outlet for the industrial production of perchloric acid. The salt also can be produced by salt metathesis reaction of ammonium salts with sodium perchlorate. This process exploits the relatively low solubility of NH_{4}ClO_{4}, which is about 10% of that for sodium perchlorate.

AP crystallises as colorless rhombohedra.

== Decomposition ==
Like most ammonium salts, ammonium perchlorate decomposes before melting:

4 NH_{4}ClO_{4} → 4 HCl + 2 N_{2} + 5 O_{2} + 6 H_{2}O

The combustion of AP is quite complex and is widely studied. AP crystals decompose before melting, even though a thin liquid layer has been observed on crystal surfaces during high-pressure combustion processes. Strong heating may lead to explosions. Complete reactions leave no residue. Pure crystals cannot sustain a flame below the pressure of 2 megapascals (290 psi).

AP is a Class 4 oxidizer (can undergo an explosive reaction) for particle sizes over 15 micrometres and is classified as an explosive for particle sizes less than 15 micrometres.

== Applications ==
The primary use of ammonium perchlorate is in making solid rocket propellants. When AP is mixed with a fuel (like a powdered aluminium and/or with an elastomeric binder), it can generate self-sustained combustion at pressures far below atmospheric pressure. It is an important oxidizer with a decades-long history of use in composite rocket propellants (including the Space Shuttle Solid Rocket Booster), military, amateur, and hobbyist high-power rockets, as well as in some fireworks.

== Toxicity ==
Perchlorate itself confers little acute toxicity. For example, sodium perchlorate has an LD_{50} of 2–4g/kg and is eliminated rapidly after ingestion. However, chronic exposure to perchlorates, even in low concentrations, has been shown to cause various thyroid problems, as it is taken up in place of iodine.
