= Lithium chlorate =

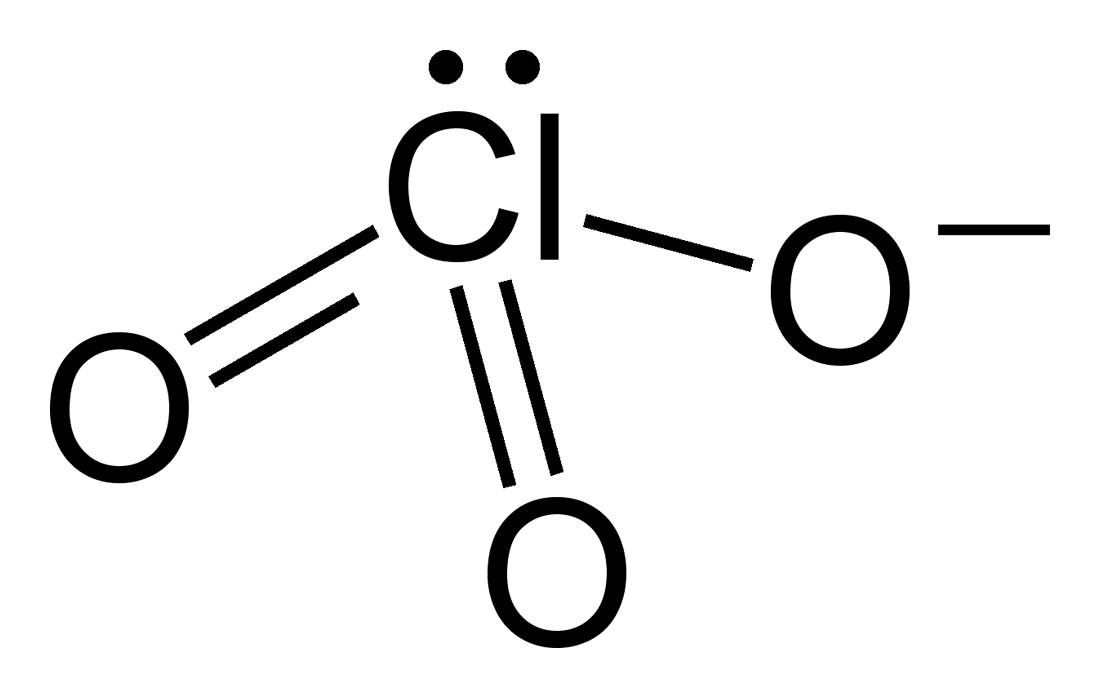

Names
- Other names Chloric acid, lithium salt

Identifiers
CAS Number	13453-71-9
3D model (JSmol)	Interactive image
ChemSpider	55520
ECHA InfoCard	100.033.288
PubChem CID	23682463
CompTox Dashboard (EPA)	DTXSID1074258
- InChI: InChI=1S/ClHO3.Li/c2-1(3)4;/h(H,2,3,4);/q;+1/p-1
- SMILES: [Li+].[O-]Cl(=O)=O

Properties
Chemical formula	LiClO_{3}
Molar mass	90.39 g/mol
Melting point	127.6 to 129 °C (261.7 to 264.2 °F; 400.8 to 402.1 K)
Solubility in water	241 g/100 mL (0 °C); 459 g/100 mL (25 °C); 777 g/100 mL (60 °C); 2226 g/100 mL (100 °C)
Magnetic susceptibility (χ)	−28.8·10^{−6} cm^{3}/mol

Related compounds
Other anions	Lithium chloride Lithium hypochlorite Lithium perchlorate
Other cations	Sodium chlorate Potassium chlorate Caesium chlorate
- Except where otherwise noted, data are given for materials in their standard state (at 25 °C [77 °F], 100 kPa). Infobox references

Lithium chlorate is the inorganic chemical compound with the formula LiClO_{3}. Like all chlorates, it is an oxidizer and may become unstable and possibly explosive if mixed with organic materials, reactive metal powders, or sulfur.

It can be manufactured by the reaction of hot, concentrated lithium hydroxide with chlorine:

3 Cl_{2} + 6 LiOH → 5 LiCl + LiClO_{3} + 3 H_{2}O

Lithium chlorate has one of the highest solubilities in water for a chemical compound. It is also a six-electron oxidant. Its electrochemical reduction is facilitated by acid, electrocatalysts and redox mediators. These properties make lithium chlorate a useful oxidant for high energy density flow batteries. Lithium chlorate has a very low melting point for an inorganic ionic salt.
