= Ammonium perbromate =

Names
- IUPAC name Azanium perbromate
- Other names Ammonium perbromate

Identifiers
CAS Number	28037-93-6
3D model (JSmol)	Interactive image
ChemSpider	13687751
PubChem CID	23293222
- InChI: InChI=1S/BrHO4.H3N/c2-1(3,4)5;/h(H,2,3,4,5);1H3 Key: MMQCMMVCGMXMPN-UHFFFAOYSA-N
- SMILES: [NH4+].[O-]Br(=O)(=O)=O

Properties
Chemical formula	NH_{4}BrO_{4}
Molar mass	161.939 g·mol^{−1}
Melting point	170–180 °C (338–356 °F; 443–453 K) decomposes, rarely explodes
Solubility in water	17.8 g/100g
Solubility in Acetonitrile	1.36 g/100g
Solubility in Acetone	3.22 g/100g
Solubility in Ethanol	2.94 g/100g
Solubility in Methanol	8.22 g/100g
- Except where otherwise noted, data are given for materials in their standard state (at 25 °C [77 °F], 100 kPa). Infobox references

Ammonium perbromate is an inorganic chemical compound with the formula NH_{4}BrO_{4}. It shares similar properties to ammonium perchlorate, but is substantially more difficult to isolate, and has a complex mechanism of decomposition.

== Properties ==
Ammonium perbromate is stable at room temperature, and has solubilities which are similar to ammonium perchlorate. Ammonium perbromate is much less hygroscopic in comparison to ammonium perchlorate, absorbing roughly 1/6 as much water when maintained in an atmosphere with high humidity.
