= Chlorite dismutase =

Enzyme

chlorite dismutase

Identifiers
- EC no.: 1.13.11.49

Databases
- IntEnz: IntEnz view
- BRENDA: BRENDA entry
- ExPASy: NiceZyme view
- KEGG: KEGG entry
- MetaCyc: metabolic pathway
- PRIAM: profile
- PDB structures: RCSB PDB PDBe PDBsum
- Gene Ontology: AmiGO / QuickGO
Search
- PMC: articles
- PubMed: articles
- NCBI: proteins

Chlorite dismutase, also known as Chlorite O_{2}-lyase (EC 1.13.11.49), is an enzyme that catalyzes the chemical reaction

ClO^{−}_{2} → Cl^{−} + O_{2}

Reactions that generate oxygen molecules are exceedingly rare in biology, except in photosynthesis, and they are difficult to mimic synthetically. Perchlorate-respiring bacteria enzymatically detoxify chlorite (ClO^{−}_{2}), the end product of the perchlorate (ClO^{−}_{4}) respiratory pathway, by converting it to dioxygen (O_{2}) and chloride (Cl^{−}). Chlorite dismutase is a hemoprotein, but it bears no structural or sequence relationships with known peroxidases or other heme proteins, and is part of a large family of proteins with more than one biochemical function.
