= Lithium perchlorate =

Chemical compound

- Lithium perchlorate

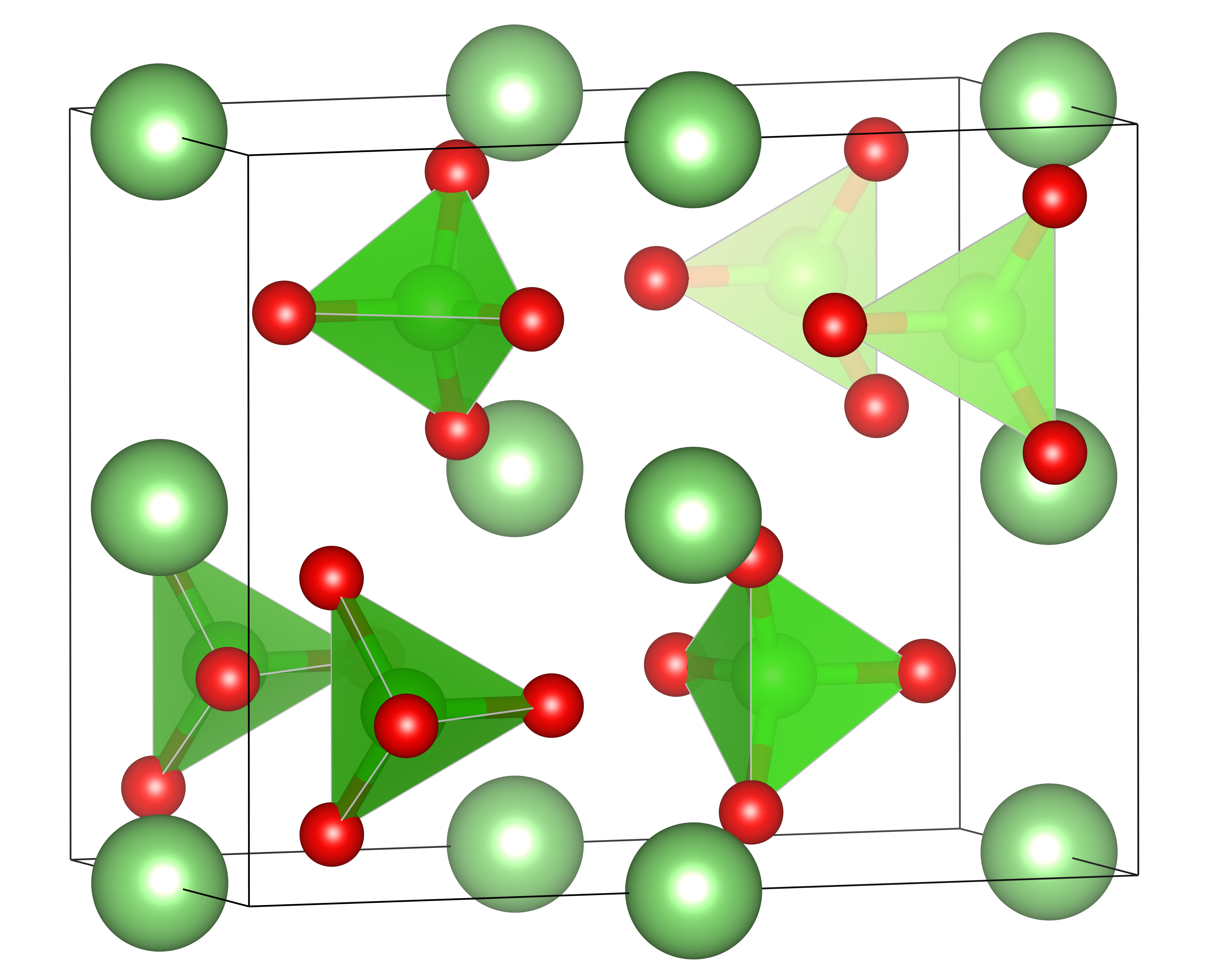
- Li^{+}Cl^{+}_{7}O^{−}_{2} Unit cell of lithium perchlorate.

Names
- IUPAC name Lithium perchlorate
- Other names Perchloric acid, lithium salt; Lithium Cloricum

Identifiers
| CAS Number | 7791-03-9 |
| 3D model (JSmol) | Interactive image |
| ChemSpider | 133514 |
| ECHA InfoCard | 100.029.307 |
| PubChem CID | 23665649 |
| UNII | Q86SE98C9C |
| CompTox Dashboard (EPA) | DTXSID40872829 |
- InChI: InChI=1S/ClHO4.Li/c2-1(3,4)5;/h(H,2,3,4,5);/q;+1/p-1 Key: MHCFAGZWMAWTNR-UHFFFAOYSA-M; InChI=1/ClHO4.Li/c2-1(3,4)5;/h(H,2,3,4,5);/q;+1/p-1 Key: MHCFAGZWMAWTNR-REWHXWOFAR
- SMILES: [Li+].[O-]Cl(=O)(=O)=O

Properties
| Chemical formula | LiClO_{4} |
| Molar mass | 106.39 g/mol (anhydrous); 160.44 g/mol (trihydrate) |
| Appearance | White crystals |
| Odor | Odorless |
| Density | 2.29 g/cm^{3} (20 °C (68 °F)) |
| Melting point | 236 °C (457 °F; 509 K) |
| Boiling point | 430 °C (806 °F; 703 K) decomposes from 400 °C (752 °F) |
| Solubility in water | 42.7 g/100 mL (0 °C (32 °F)); 49 g/100 mL (10 °C (50 °F)); 59.8 g/100 mL (25 °C (77 °F)); 71.8 g/100 mL (40 °C (104 °F)); 119.5 g/100 mL (80 °C (176 °F)); 300 g/100 mL (120 °C (248 °F)) |
| Solubility | 79.3 g/100 g 1-butanol; 58 g/100 g isobutanol |
| Solubility in acetone | 137 g/100 g |
| Solubility in methanol | 182 g/100 g |
| Solubility in ethanol | 152 g/100 g |
| Solubility in 1-propanol | 105 g/100 g |
| Solubility in ethyl acetate | 95.2 g/100 g |
| Solubility in ethyl ether | 113.7 g/100 g |

Structure
| Space group | Pnma, No. 62 |
| Lattice constant | a = 865.7(1) pm, b = 691.29(9) pm, c = 483.23(6) pm |
| Formula units (Z) | 4 formula per cell |
| Coordination geometry | tetrahedral at Cl |

Thermochemistry
| Heat capacity (C) | 105 J/mol⋅K |
| Std molar entropy (S^{⦵}_{298}) | 125.5 J/mol⋅K |
| Std enthalpy of formation (Δ_{f}H^{⦵}_{298}) | −380.99 kJ/mol |
| Gibbs free energy (Δ_{f}G^{⦵}) | −254 kJ/mol |

Hazards
- Occupational safety and health (OHS/OSH)
| Main hazards | Oxidizer, irritant |
- GHS labelling
| Pictograms | (GHS03: Oxidizing) (GHS05: Corrosive) (GHS07: Exclamation mark) |
| Signal word | Danger |
| Hazard statements | H272, H315, H319, H335 |
| Precautionary statements | P210, P220, P221, P260, P264, P270, P271, P280, P301+P312+P330, P301+P330+P331, P303+P361+P353, P304+P340+P310, P305+P351+P338+P310, P363, P370+P378, P403+P233, P405, P501 |
| NFPA 704 (fire diamond) | 1 0 0 OX |
- Lethal dose or concentration (LD, LC)
| LD_{50} (median dose) | 1150+850 −850 mg/kg (Oral - Rat - Female) |
| Safety data sheet (SDS) | MSDS |

Related compounds
| Other anions | Lithium chloride; Lithium hypochlorite; Lithium chlorate |
| Other cations | Sodium perchlorate; Potassium perchlorate; Rubidium perchlorate |
- Except where otherwise noted, data are given for materials in their standard state (at 25 °C [77 °F], 100 kPa). verify (what is ?) Infobox references

Lithium perchlorate is the inorganic compound with the formula LiClO_{4}. This white or colourless crystalline salt is noteworthy for its high solubility in many solvents. It exists both in anhydrous form and as a trihydrate.

== Applications ==
=== Inorganic chemistry ===
Lithium perchlorate is used as a source of oxygen in some chemical oxygen generators. It decomposes at about 400 °C (752 °F), yielding lithium chloride and oxygen:

LiClO_{4} → LiCl + 2 O_{2}

Over 60% of the mass of the lithium perchlorate is released as oxygen. It has both the highest oxygen to weight and oxygen to volume ratio of all practical perchlorate salts, and higher oxygen to volume ratio than liquid oxygen.

Lithium perchlorate is used as an oxidizer in some experimental (as of 1975) solid rocket propellants, and rarely to produce red colored flame in pyrotechnic compositions.

=== Organic chemistry ===
LiClO_{4} is highly soluble in organic solvents, even diethyl ether. Such solutions are employed in Diels–Alder reactions, where it is proposed that the Lewis acidic Li^{+} binds to Lewis basic sites on the dienophile, thereby accelerating the reaction.

Lithium perchlorate is also used as a co-catalyst in the coupling of α,β-unsaturated carbonyls with aldehydes, also known as the Baylis–Hillman reaction.

Solid lithium perchlorate is found to be a mild and efficient Lewis acid for promoting cyanosilylation of carbonyl compounds under neutral conditions.

=== Batteries ===
Lithium perchlorate is also used as an electrolyte salt in lithium-ion batteries. Lithium perchlorate is chosen over alternative salts such as lithium hexafluorophosphate or lithium tetrafluoroborate when its superior electrical impedance, conductivity, hygroscopicity, and anodic stability properties are of importance to the specific application. However, these beneficial properties are often overshadowed by the electrolyte's strong oxidizing properties, making the electrolyte reactive toward its solvent at high temperatures and/or high current loads. Due to these hazards the battery is often considered unfit for industrial applications.

=== Biochemistry ===
Concentrated solutions of lithium perchlorate (4.5 mol/L) are used as a chaotropic agent to denature proteins.

== Production ==
Lithium perchlorate can be manufactured by reaction of sodium perchlorate with lithium chloride. It can be also prepared by electrolysis of lithium chlorate at 200 mA/cm^{2} at temperatures above 20 °C (68 °F).

== Safety ==
Perchlorates often give explosive mixtures with organic compounds, finely divided metals, sulfur, and other reducing agents.
