= Perchlorate reductase =

Class of enzymes

Perchlorate reductase is an enzyme that catalyzes the chemical reactions:

ClO_{4}^{−} + 2 AH_{2} $\rightleftharpoons$ ClO_{2}^{−} + 2 A + 2 H_{2}O

and

ClO_{3}^{−} + AH_{2} $\rightleftharpoons$ ClO_{2}^{−} + A + H_{2}O

Thus, the substrates of this enzyme are a reduced electron acceptor (denoted AH_{2}) and either chlorate or perchlorate, sometimes collectively denoted as (per)chlorate. The products are chlorite, an oxidized electron acceptor (denoted A), and water. It is closely related to the enzyme chlorate reductase, but is distinguished by its ability to reduce both perchlorate and chlorate, whereas chlorate reductase only acts on chlorate. Perchlorate reductase and chlorate reductase are closely related but form genetically distinct clades.

As of February 2023, perchlorate reductase has not been assigned a specific Enzyme Commission number, but along with chlorate reductase (EC 1.97.1.1), it would presumably be a member of the EC 1.97.1.- oxidoreductase subclass. Some databases, including BRENDA, currently combine perchlorate reductase and chlorate reductase listings.

== Structure ==
Perchlorate reductase is usually encoded as a combination of four genes, denoted pcrABCD. The active subunits are pcrA and pcrB which form a periplasmic dimer similar to the active complex in nitrate reductase. pcrC is a believed to be a c-type cytochrome that connects the AB complex to the membrane and allows for electron shuttling. The function of pcrD is uncertain, but may encode a molybdenum-containing chaperone protein specific to assembling the pcrABC system. All known functional perchlorate reductase enzymes include genetically similar versions of pcrABCD except for the Campylobacterota Arcobacter strain CAB, which lacks a traditional pcrC and appears to have replaced it with an unrelated Campylobacterota cytochrome.

All characterized organisms that encode perchlorate reductase also have the enzyme chlorite dismutase, which reduces the chlorite produced by perchlorate reductase, and prevents this reactive compound from accumulating to toxic levels. The pcrABCD and chlorite dismutase genes are typically located together in the bacterial genome.

== Literature ==
- Benedict C. Okekea; William T. Frankenberger Jr (2003). "Molecular analysis of a perchlorate reductase from a perchlorate-respiring bacterium Perc1ace". Microbiological Research. 158 (4): 337–344. doi:10.1078/0944-5013-00213. PMID 14717455.
- Servé W. M. Kengen; Geoffrey B. Rikken; Wilfred R. Hagen; Cees G. van Ginkel; Alfons J. M. Stams (November 1999). "Purification and Characterization of (Per)Chlorate Reductase from the Chlorate-Respiring Strain GR-1". J. Bacteriol. 181 (21): 6706–6711. doi:10.1128/JB.181.21.6706-6711.1999. PMC 94135. PMID 10542172.
