= Supporting electrolyte =

Inert electrolyte: non-redox active and non complexing ligand

A supporting electrolyte, in electrochemistry, according to an IUPAC definition, is an electrolyte containing chemical species that are not electroactive (within the range of potentials used) and which has an ionic strength and conductivity much larger than those due to the electroactive species added to the electrolyte. Supporting electrolyte is also sometimes referred to as background electrolyte, inert electrolyte, or inactive electrolyte.

Supporting electrolytes are widely used in electrochemical measurements when control of electrode potentials is required. This is done to increase the conductivity of the solution (to practically eliminate the so-called IR drop, or ohmic potential drop from Ohm's law: V = IR), to eliminate the transport of electroactive species by ion migration in the electric field, to maintain constant ionic strength, to maintain constant pH, etc. Supporting electrolytes also play a critical role in defining the structure of the electrical double layer at the electrode-electrolyte interface, which can influence electron transfer kinetics and interfacial capacitance. Common supporting electrolytes include tetraalkylammonium salts (e.g., tetrabutylammonium hexafluorophosphate) in nonaqueous systems and alkali metal salts (e.g., potassium chloride or sodium sulfate) in aqueous media, chosen for their high solubility, chemical inertness, and wide electrochemical window.

== Required properties ==
To properly fulfil its functions, a supporting electrolyte must meet the following criteria:

- It must be completely dissociated in aqueous solution, so it is a strong electrolyte with a good conductivity;
- It must be sufficiently soluble in order to be able to increase the ionic strength of the solution in the experimental conditions to be explored;
- It must be chemically inert with the other solutes present in solution:

– no precipitation reaction, or formation of colloidal suspension,
– no formation of complex, so, it is a poor ligand and a weak Lewis base,
– no undesirable redox reaction, so, it is not a redox-active species, or the redox reaction is kinetically strongly hindered,
– no undesirable modification of the pH of the studied solution,
– no loss in the gas phase,
– … .

== Commonly used background electrolytes ==
Sodium perchlorate (NaClO_{4}) is often used as a background electrolyte because of its convenient properties to fulfil this function. It is a highly soluble salt (2096 g/L at 25 °C) allowing to increase the ionic strength of a solution up to 8 M. It is not a complexing ligand, thus it does not interfere in complexation studies. Quite surprisingly, it is also a redox-insensitive, or a redox-inactive, species, and does not interfere in redox reaction. Contra-intuitively, although perchlorate is well known to be a strong oxidizer in propulsive powder at high temperature and is used in rocket propellant and fireworks, when the perchlorate anion is dissolved in aqueous solution, it does not exhibit any oxidizing power.

Astonishingly, sodium perchlorate can be used with solutions containing ferrous ions (Fe^{2+}) although these ions are quite sensitive to oxidation by dissolved oxygen if the solution is exposed to the air.

The reason is not to be searched in its thermodynamic stability because when in contact with a reducer at high temperature, it violently reacts to dissipate a large quantity of energy in a vigorous exothermic reaction. The reason of its redox inertness when dissolved in water is due to severe kinetic limitations to abiotically accept electrons, even if the oxidation state of the central chlorine atom in this tetrahedral oxyanion is +7. In term of chemical kinetics, perchlorate is a non-labile species because of a high activation energy hindering its redox reactivity. This can be partially explained by the shielding of the central chlorine (+7) atom by the four surrounding oxygen atoms. The ionic radius of the perchlorate anion is about the same as this of the iodide anion. Its molecular orbital configuration likely also plays a role in its great inertness in aqueous solution, and as a rule of thumb, most oxyanions with a central atom in its highest oxidation state are weaker oxidizers than other oxyanions of the same series with a lower oxidation state. Hypochorite (ClO^{−}) and chlorate (ClO^{−}_{3}) anions although being able to accept less electrons than perchlorate (ClO^{−}_{4}) are much stronger oxidizers in aqueous solution because of less kinetic limitations.

== See also ==
- Aqueous solution
- Capillary electrophoresis
- Crystal growth
- Dissolution
- Electrochemistry
- Electrolysis
- Electrolyte
- Electrophoresis
- Solvation
