= Methyl perchlorate =

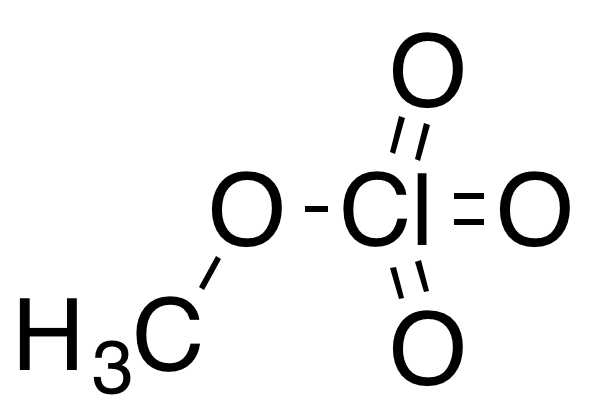

Names
- Preferred IUPAC name Methyl perchlorate
- Other names Perchloric acid, methyl ester;

Identifiers
CAS Number	17043-56-0
3D model (JSmol)	Interactive image
Abbreviations	MeClO_{4}
ChemSpider	10179111
PubChem CID	12776836
- InChI: InChI=1S/CH3ClO4/c1-6-2(3,4)5/h1H3 Key: NHZLDRXCSVFATE-UHFFFAOYSA-N
- SMILES: COCl(=O)(=O)=O

Properties
Chemical formula	CH_{3}ClO_{4}
Molar mass	114.48 g·mol^{−1}
Appearance	liquid
Boiling point	52.0 °C (125.6 °F; 325.1 K)

Hazards
Flash point	−14.8 ± 18.7 °C
- Except where otherwise noted, data are given for materials in their standard state (at 25 °C [77 °F], 100 kPa). Infobox references

Methyl perchlorate is an organic chemical compound with the chemical formula CH_{3}ClO_{4}. Its molecular structure is a methyl group covalently bonded by a single bond to a perchlorate group, CH_{3}−O−Cl(=O)_{3}, in which chlorine has an oxidation state of +7. Like many other perchlorates, it is a high energy material, more explosive than methyl nitrate. It is also a toxic alkylating agent and exposure to the vapor can cause death.

It can be prepared by treating iodomethane with a solution of silver perchlorate in benzene, distillation of barium methylsulfate and barium perchlorate, or bubbling diazomethane into anhydrous perchloric acid.
