= Potassium perchlorate =

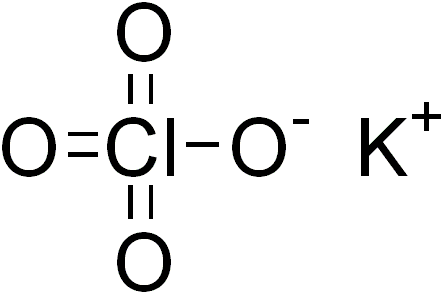

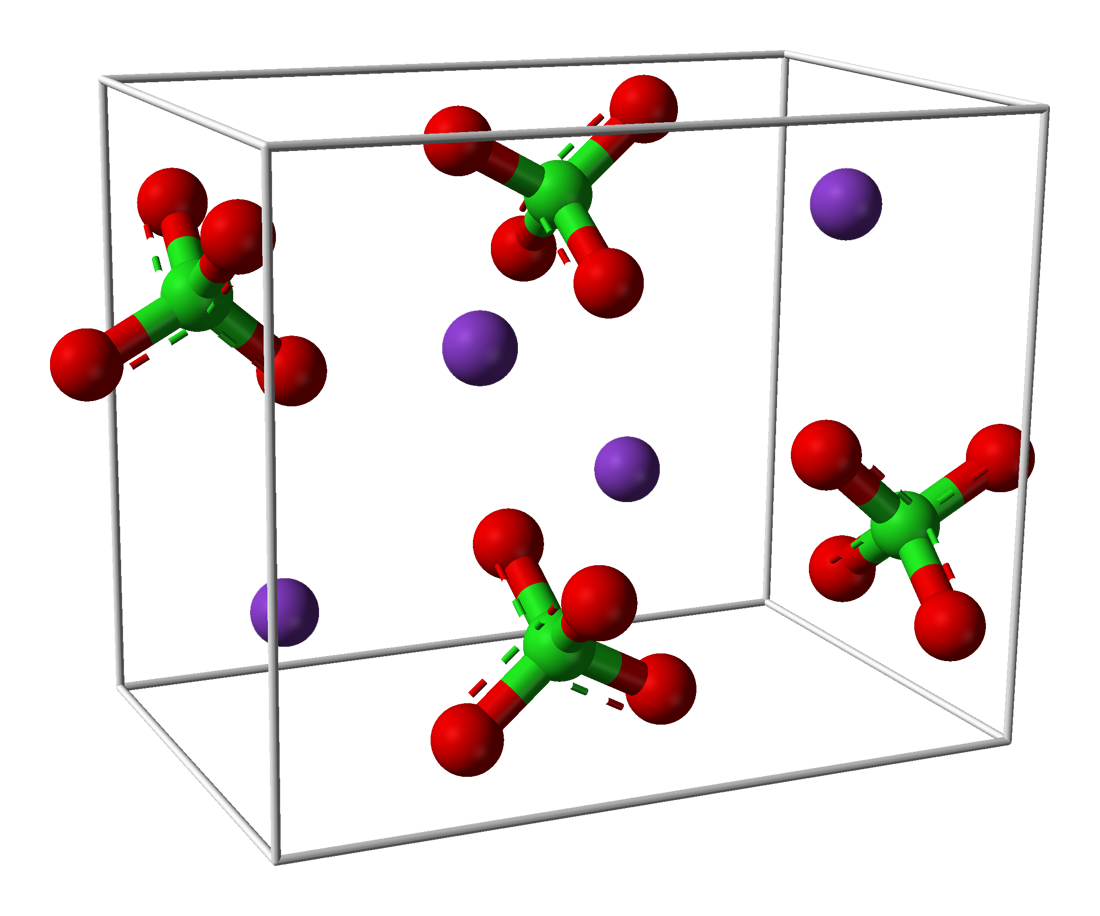

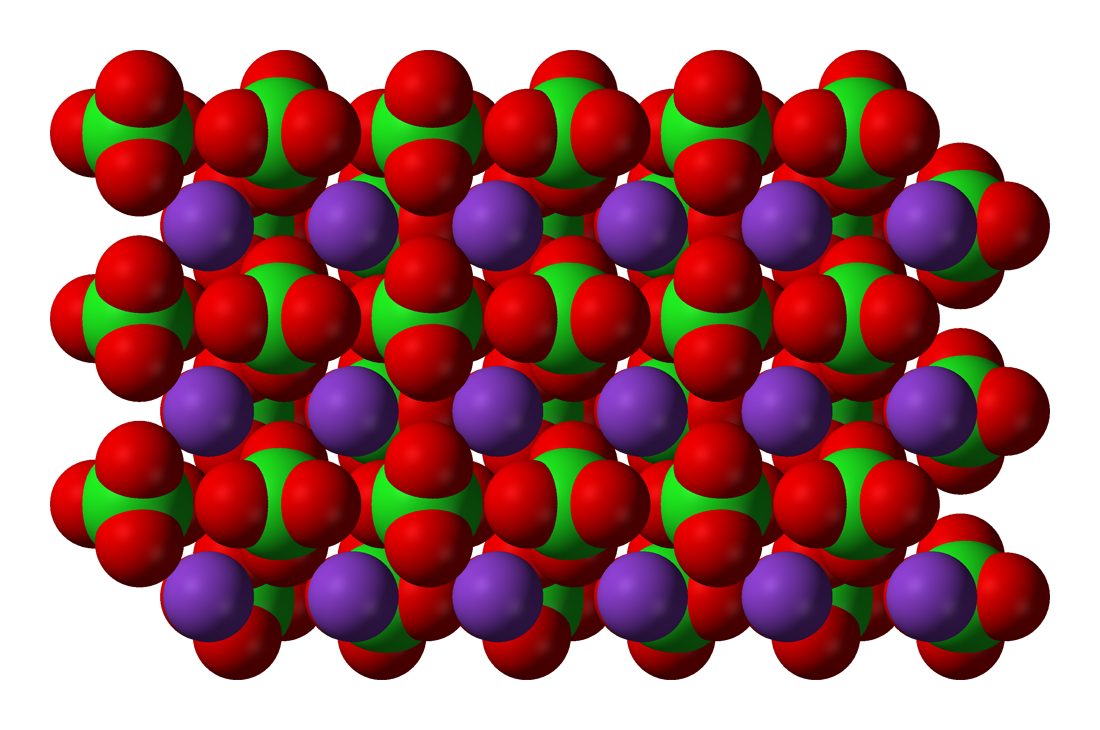

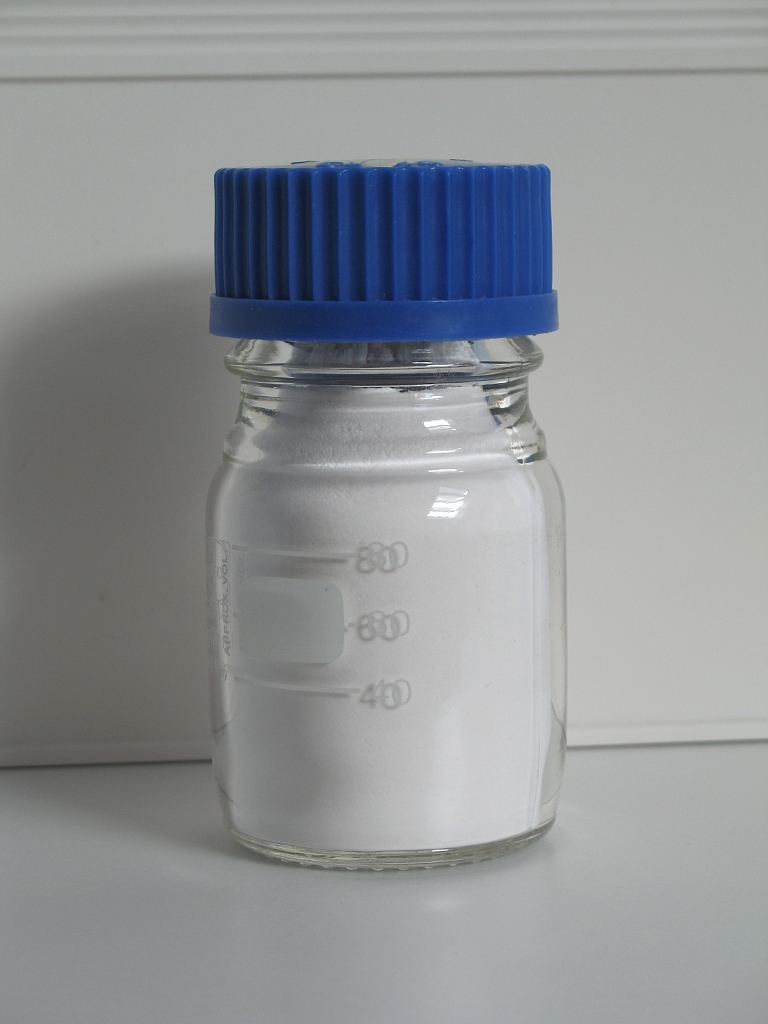

Names
- Other names Potassium chlorate(VII); Perchloric acid, potassium salt; peroidin

Identifiers
CAS Number	7778-74-7
3D model (JSmol)	Interactive image
ChEMBL	ChEMBL1200696
ChemSpider	22913
ECHA InfoCard	100.029.011
EC Number	231-912-9
PubChem CID	516900
RTECS number	SC9700000
UNII	42255P5X4D
UN number	1489
CompTox Dashboard (EPA)	DTXSID3047003
- InChI: InChI=1S/ClHO4.K/c2-1(3,4)5;/h(H,2,3,4,5);/q;+1/p-1 Key: YLMGFJXSLBMXHK-UHFFFAOYSA-M; InChI=1/ClHO4.K/c2-1(3,4)5;/h(H,2,3,4,5);/q;+1/p-1 Key: YLMGFJXSLBMXHK-REWHXWOFAB
- SMILES: [K+].[O-]Cl(=O)(=O)=O

Properties
Chemical formula	KClO_{4}
Molar mass	138.54 g·mol^{−1}
Appearance	colourless/ white crystalline powder
Density	2.5239 g/cm^{3}
Melting point	610 °C (1,130 °F; 883 K) decomposes from 400 °C
Solubility in water	0.76 g/100 mL (0 °C); 1.5 g/100 mL (25 °C); 4.76 g/100 mL (40 °C); 21.08 g/100 mL (100 °C)
Solubility product (K_{sp})	1.05·10^{−2}
Solubility	negligible in alcohol insoluble in ether
Solubility in ethanol	47 mg/kg (0 °C); 120 mg/kg (25 °C)
Solubility in acetone	1.6 g/kg
Solubility in ethyl acetate	15 mg/kg
Refractive index (n_{D})	1.4724

Structure
Crystal structure	Rhombohedral

Thermochemistry
Heat capacity (C)	111.35 J/mol·K
Std molar entropy (S^{⦵}_{298})	150.86 J/mol·K
Std enthalpy of formation (Δ_{f}H^{⦵}_{298})	−433 kJ/mol
Gibbs free energy (Δ_{f}G^{⦵})	−300.4 kJ/mol

Hazards
- GHS labelling
Pictograms	(GHS03: Oxidizing) (GHS07: Exclamation mark)
Signal word	Danger
Hazard statements	H271, H302, H335
Precautionary statements	P220, P280
NFPA 704 (fire diamond)	1 0 1 OX
Safety data sheet (SDS)	MSDS

Related compounds
Other anions	Potassium chloride Potassium chlorate Potassium periodate
Other cations	Ammonium perchlorate Sodium perchlorate
- Except where otherwise noted, data are given for materials in their standard state (at 25 °C [77 °F], 100 kPa). verify (what is ?) Infobox references

Potassium perchlorate is the inorganic salt with the chemical formula KClO_{4}. Like other perchlorates, this salt is a strong oxidizer when the solid is heated at high temperature, although it usually reacts very slowly in solution with reducing agents or organic substances. This colorless crystalline solid is a common oxidizer used in fireworks, ammunition percussion caps, and explosive primers, and is used variously in propellants, flash compositions, stars, and sparklers. It has been used as a solid rocket propellant, although in that application it has mostly been replaced by the more performant ammonium perchlorate.

KClO_{4} has a relatively low solubility in water (1.5 g in 100 mL of water at 25 °C).

== Production ==
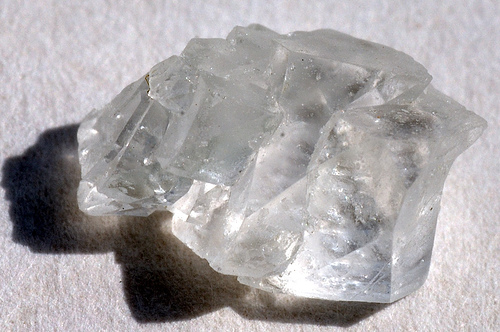
Potassium perchlorate in crystal form

Potassium perchlorate is prepared industrially by treating an aqueous solution of sodium perchlorate with potassium chloride. This single precipitation reaction exploits the low solubility of KClO_{4}, which is about 1/100 as much as the solubility of NaClO_{4} (209.6 g/100 mL at 25 °C).

It can also be produced by bubbling chlorine gas through a solution of potassium chlorate and potassium hydroxide, and by the reaction of perchloric acid with potassium hydroxide; however, this is not used widely due to the dangers of perchloric acid.

Another preparation involves the electrolysis of a potassium chlorate solution, causing KClO_{4} to form and precipitate at the anode. This procedure is complicated by the low solubility of both potassium chlorate and potassium perchlorate, the latter of which may precipitate onto the electrodes and impede the current.

== Oxidizing properties ==
KClO_{4} is an oxidizer, greatly increasing the rate of combustion of combustible materials relative to burning in air. Combustion with glucose gives carbon dioxide, water molecules and potassium chloride:

3 KClO_{4} + C_{6}H_{12}O_{6} → 6 CO_{2} + 6 H_{2}O + 3 KCl

The conversion of solid glucose into hot gaseous CO_{2} is the basis of the explosive force of this and other such mixtures. With sugar, KClO_{4} yields a low explosive, provided a necessary confinement. Otherwise such mixtures simply deflagrate with an intense purple flame characteristic of potassium. Flash compositions used in firecrackers, defined in the US as containing 50 mg of powder or less, usually consist of a mixture of aluminium powder and potassium perchlorate, although this is one of the few instances where potassium chlorate is still allowed as a major component. This mixture, called flash powder, is also used in ground and air fireworks.

As an oxidizer, potassium perchlorate can be used safely in the presence of sulfur, whereas potassium chlorate cannot. The greater reactivity of chlorate is typical – perchlorates are kinetically poorer oxidants. Chlorate can produce chloric acid (HClO_{3}) in contact with impure acidic sulfur or certain sulfur compounds, which is highly unstable and can lead to premature ignition of the composition. Otherwise the sensitivity of perchlorate / sulfur mixtures is about the same as chlorate / sulfur mixtures, although it lowers the ignition temperature of chlorate mixtures more. Correspondingly, perchloric acid (HClO_{4}) is quite stable.

In commercial use, potassium perchlorate is used in consumer and display pyrotechnics, some types of solid rocket fuels, and specialty black powder substitutes such as Pyrodex. The exact compositions for different types are trade secrets, but the SDS lists the components as:

Chemical	Percent Range
Potassium perchlorate	15-40%
Potassium nitrate	15-40%
Sodium benzoate	5-10%
Sodium nitrate	1-5%

Depending on the specific mixture, it is classified as either 1.3C or 1.4C for shipping. The 1.4C designation of "no significant blast hazard" allows up to 75 kilograms (165 lb) to be shipped by air.

== Debated medical use ==
Potassium perchlorate can be used as an antithyroid agent used to treat hyperthyroidism, usually in combination with one other medication. This application exploits the similar ionic radius and hydrophilicity of perchlorate and iodide.

Perchlorate ion, a common low-level water contaminant in the USA due to the aerospace industry, has been shown to reduce iodine uptake and thus is classified as a goitrogen. Perchlorate ion is a competitive inhibitor of the process by which iodide is actively accumulated into the thyroid follicular cells. Studies involving healthy adult volunteers determined that at levels above 7 μg/(kg·d), perchlorate begins to temporarily inhibit the thyroid gland's ability to absorb iodine from the bloodstream. This level is 9000 times greater than has been found in any water supply, however.

The reduction of the iodide pool by perchlorate has a dual effect – reduction of excess hormone synthesis and hyperthyroidism, on the one hand, and reduction of thyroid inhibitor synthesis and hypothyroidism on the other. Perchlorate remains very useful as a single dose application in tests measuring the discharge of radioiodide accumulated in the thyroid as a result of many different disruptions in the further metabolism of iodide in the thyroid gland.

Treatment of hyperthyroidism (including Graves' disease) with 600–2000 mg potassium perchlorate (430–1400 mg perchlorate) daily for periods of several months, or longer, was once a common practice, particularly in Europe, and perchlorate use at lower doses to treat thyroid problems continues to this day. Although 400 mg of potassium perchlorate divided into four or five daily doses was used initially and found effective, higher doses were introduced when 400 mg/d was discovered not to control thyrotoxicosis in all subjects.

Current regimens for treatment of hypothyroidism (including Graves' disease), when a patient is exposed to additional sources of iodine, commonly include 500 mg potassium perchlorate twice per day for 18–40 days.

In another related study were subjects drank just 1 litre (34 US fl oz) of perchlorate-containing water per day at a concentration of 10 ppm, i.e. daily 10 mg of perchlorate ions were ingested, an average 38% reduction in the uptake of Iodine was observed.

However, when the average perchlorate absorption in perchlorate plant workers subjected to the highest exposure has been estimated as approximately 0.5 mg/(kg·d), as in the above paragraph, a 67% reduction of iodine uptake would be expected. Studies of chronically exposed workers though have thus far failed to detect any abnormalities of thyroid function, including the uptake of iodine. This may well be attributable to sufficient daily exposure, or intake, of stable iodine-127 among these workers and the short 8 hr biological half life of perchlorate in the body.

== See also ==
- Chlorate
- Iodide
