= Lithium permanganate =

lithium permanganate
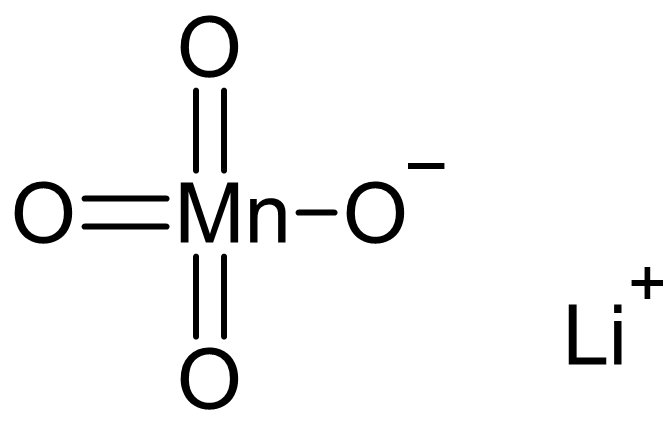

Identifiers
CAS Number	13453-79-7
3D model (JSmol)	Interactive image
ChemSpider	11195420
PubChem CID	23709765
CompTox Dashboard (EPA)	DTXSID10635766
- InChI: InChI=1S/Li.Mn.4O/q+1;;;;;-1 Key: MOAIUDFKHZGSPK-UHFFFAOYSA-N
- SMILES: [Li+].O=[Mn](=O)(=O)[O-]

Properties
Chemical formula	LiMnO_{4}
Molar mass	125.87 g·mol^{−1}
Appearance	purple
Solubility in water	soluble
- Except where otherwise noted, data are given for materials in their standard state (at 25 °C [77 °F], 100 kPa). Infobox references

Lithium permanganate is an inorganic compound with the chemical formula LiMnO_{4}. It can be produced by the reaction of lithium sulfate and barium permanganate, and the trihydrate LiMnO_{4}·3H_{2}O can be crystallized from the solution. It decomposes violently at 199 °C to a mixture of spinel salts:

LiMnO_{4} → Li_{_{2}}MnO_{_{3}} + LiMn_{_{2}}O_{_{4}} + O_{2}↑
