= Rubidium perchlorate =

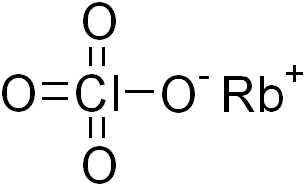

Names
- IUPAC name Rubidium perchlorate
- Other names Perchloric acid rubidium salt Rubidium chlorate(VII); Rubidii perchloras (lat.)

Identifiers
CAS Number	13510-42-4
3D model (JSmol)	Interactive image
ChemSpider	145966
ECHA InfoCard	100.033.476
EC Number	236-840-1
PubChem CID	23673707
CompTox Dashboard (EPA)	DTXSID60884621
- InChI: InChI=1S/ClHO4.Rb/c2-1(3,4)5;/h(H,2,3,4,5);/q;+1/p-1 Key: NQYGGOOZLKJKPS-UHFFFAOYSA-M; InChI=1/ClHO4.Rb/c2-1(3,4)5;/h(H,2,3,4,5);/q;+1/p-1 Key: NQYGGOOZLKJKPS-REWHXWOFAS
- SMILES: [Rb+].[O-]Cl(=O)(=O)=O

Properties
Chemical formula	RbClO_{4}
Molar mass	184.918 g/mol
Appearance	Colorless crystals
Density	2.878 g/cm^{3} 2.71 g/cm^{3} over 279 °C
Melting point	281 °C (538 °F; 554 K)
Boiling point	600 °C (1,112 °F; 873 K) (decomposes)
Solubility in water	see chart
Solubility product (K_{sp})	3×10^{−3}

Hazards
- GHS labelling
Pictograms	(GHS03: Oxidizing) (GHS07: Exclamation mark)
Signal word	Warning
Hazard statements	H272, H302, H315, H319, H332, H335
Precautionary statements	P210, P220, P221, P261, P264, P270, P271, P280, P301+P312, P302+P352, P304+P312, P304+P340, P305+P351+P338, P312, P321, P330, P332+P313, P337+P313, P362, P370+P378, P403+P233, P405, P501
NFPA 704 (fire diamond)	2 0 0 OX
Safety data sheet (SDS)	MSDS at Science Lab
- Except where otherwise noted, data are given for materials in their standard state (at 25 °C [77 °F], 100 kPa). verify (what is ?) Infobox references

Rubidium perchlorate, RbClO_{4}, is the perchlorate of rubidium. It is an oxidizing agent, as are all perchlorates.

== Preparation and properties ==
Rubidium perchlorate can be obtained through the careful heating of a rubidium chlorate solution, leading to a disproportionation reaction with the release of oxygen gas:

2 RbClO_{3} → RbClO_{4} + RbCl + O_{2}

When heated, it decomposes into the chloride and oxygen:

RbClO_{4} → RbCl + 2 O_{2}

It has two polymorphs. Below 279 °C, it crystallizes in orthorhombic crystal system with lattice constants a = 0.927 nm, b = 0.581 nm, c = 0.753 nm. Over 279 °C, it has a cubic structure with lattice constant a = 0.770 nm.

Table of solubility in water:

Temperature (°C)	0	8.5	14	20	25	50	70	99
Solubility (g / 100 ml)	1.09	0.59	0.767	0.999	1.30	3.442	6.72	17.39
