= Perchlorate =

Ion, and compounds containing the ion

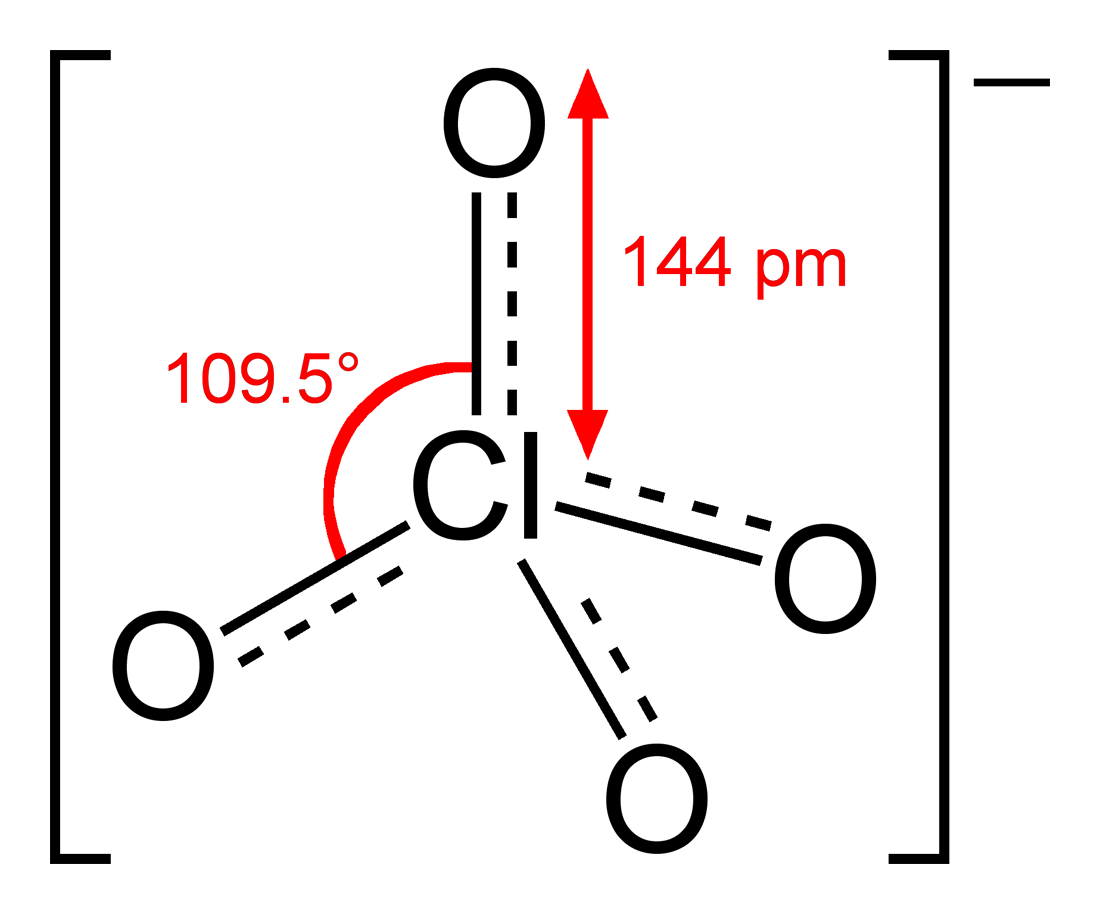
- Skeletal model of perchlorate showing various dimensions

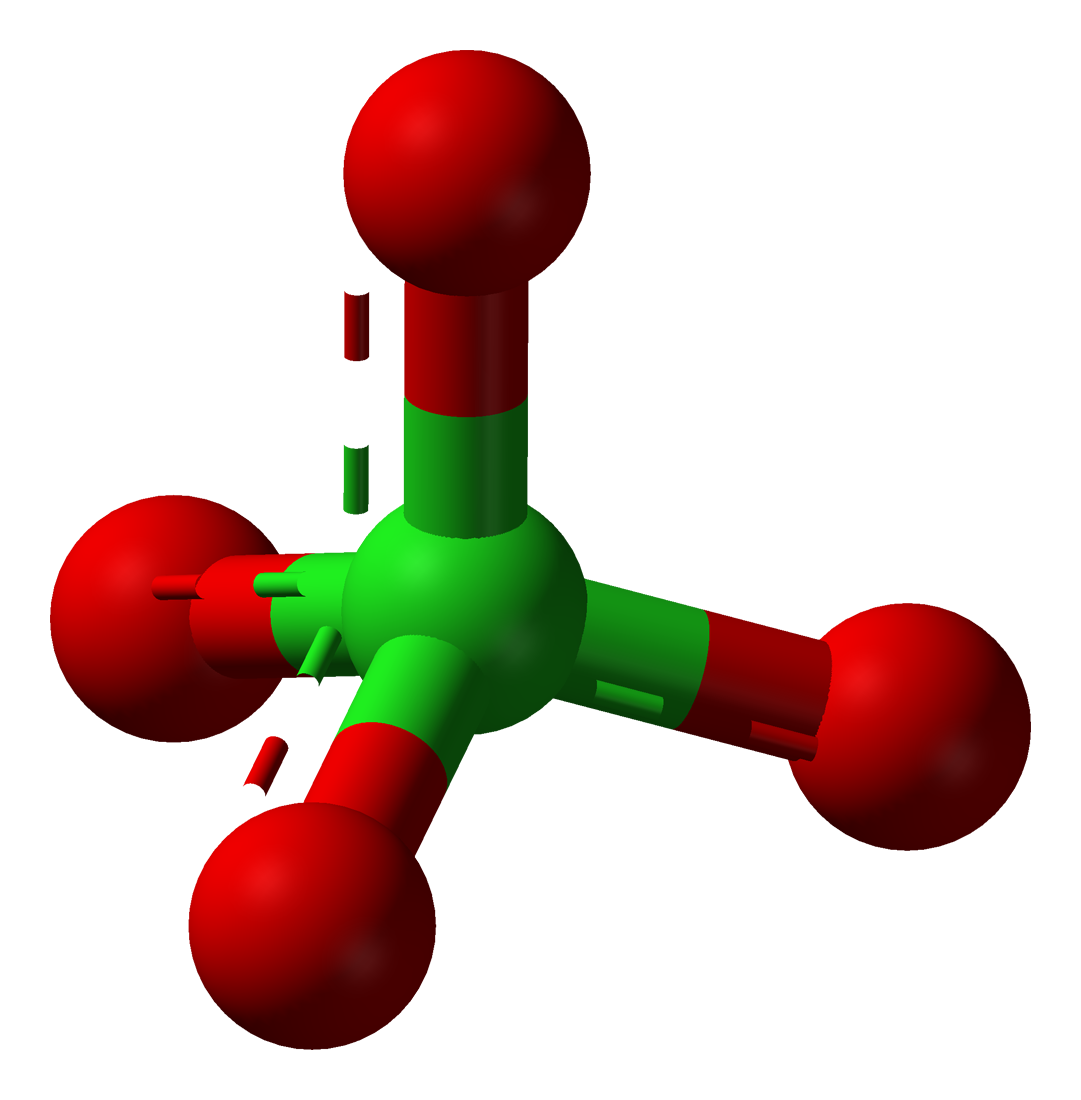
Ball-and-stick model of the perchlorate ion
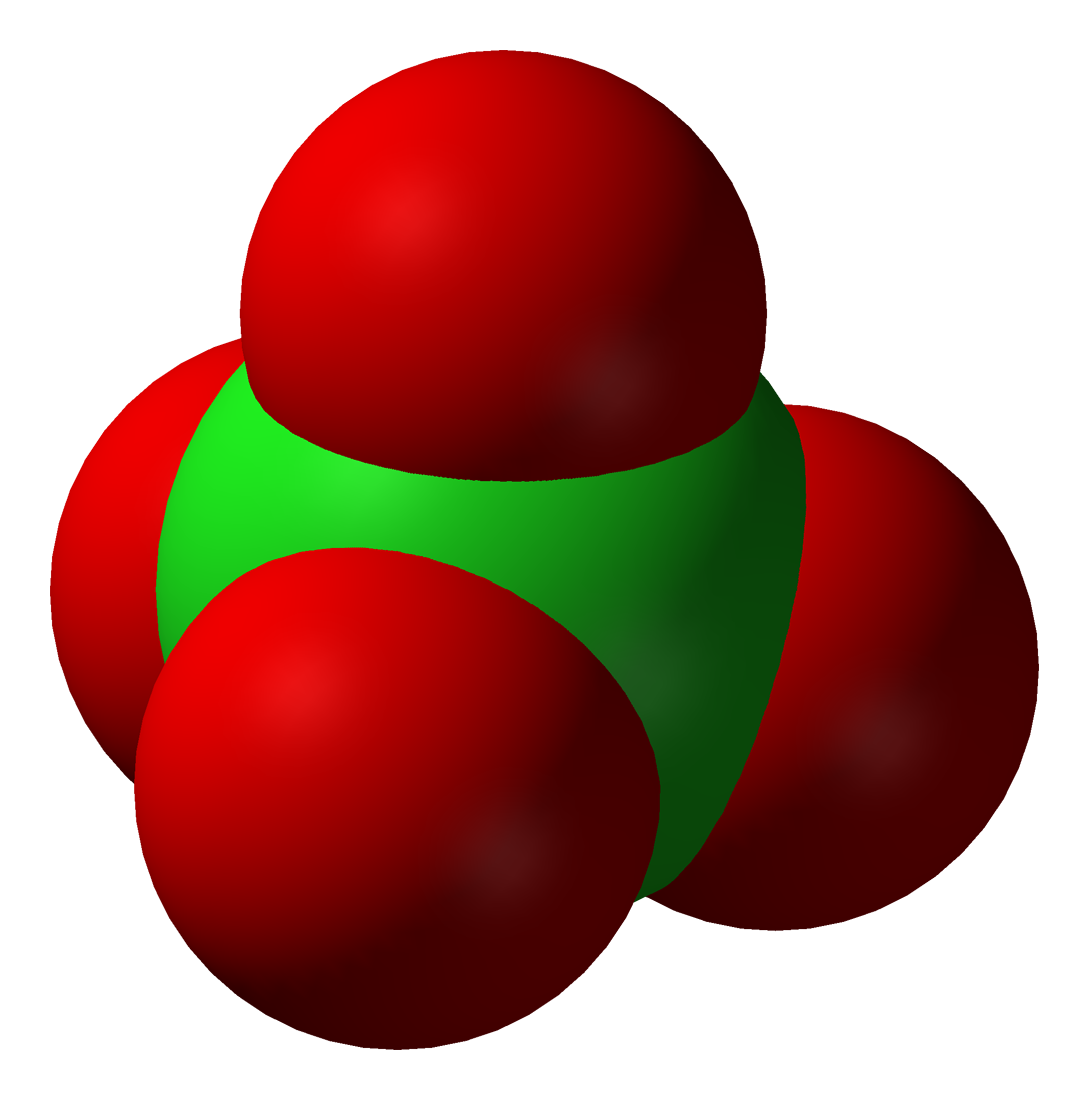
Spacefill model of perchlorate

Names
- Systematic IUPAC name Perchlorate

Identifiers
CAS Number	14797-73-0
3D model (JSmol)	Interactive image
ChEBI	CHEBI:49706
ChEMBL	ChEMBL1161634
ChemSpider	109953
DrugBank	DB03138
ECHA InfoCard	100.152.366
Gmelin Reference	2136
IUPHAR/BPS	4524
MeSH	180053
PubChem CID	123351
UNII	VLA4NZX2P4
CompTox Dashboard (EPA)	DTXSID6024252
- InChI: InChI=1S/ClHO4/c2-1(3,4)5/h(H,2,3,4,5)/p-1 Key: VLTRZXGMWDSKGL-UHFFFAOYSA-M
- SMILES: [O-][Cl+3]([O-])([O-])[O-]

Properties
Chemical formula	ClO^{−}_{4}
Molar mass	99.45 g·mol^{−1}
Conjugate acid	Perchloric acid
- Except where otherwise noted, data are given for materials in their standard state (at 25 °C [77 °F], 100 kPa). verify (what is ?) Infobox references

A perchlorate is a chemical compound used mainly in making rocket fuel and fireworks, as well as some other industrial uses. In many countries it is used to treat hyperthyroidism, but (mainly because of its effect on the thyroid gland) it is an environmental toxin which endangers human health when it contaminates food and water.

Perchlorates contain the perchlorate ion, ClO^{−}_{4}, the conjugate base of perchloric acid (ionic perchlorate). As counterions, there can be metal cations, quaternary ammonium cations or other ions, for example, nitronium cation (NO^{+}_{2}).

The term perchlorate can also describe perchlorate esters or covalent perchlorates. These are organic compounds that are alkyl or aryl esters of perchloric acid. They are characterized by a covalent bond between an oxygen atom of the ClO_{4} moiety and an organyl group.

In most ionic perchlorates, the cation is non-coordinating. The majority of ionic perchlorates are commercially produced salts commonly used as oxidizers for pyrotechnic devices and for their ability to control static electricity in food packaging. Additionally, they have been used in rocket propellants, fertilizers, and as bleaching agents in the paper and textile industries.

Ionic perchlorates are typically colorless solids that exhibit good solubility in water. The perchlorate ion forms when they dissolve in water, dissociating into ions. Many perchlorate salts also exhibit good solubility in non-aqueous solvents. Four perchlorates are of primary commercial interest: ammonium perchlorate (NH_{4})ClO_{4}, perchloric acid HClO_{4}, potassium perchlorate KClO_{4} and sodium perchlorate NaClO_{4}.

== Production ==
Very few chemical oxidants are strong enough to convert chlorate to perchlorate. Persulfate, ozone, or lead dioxide are all known to do so, but the reactions are too delicate and low-yielding for commercial viability.

Perchlorate salts are typically manufactured through the process of electrolysis, which involves oxidizing aqueous solutions of corresponding chlorates. This technique is commonly employed in the production of sodium perchlorate, which finds widespread use as a key ingredient in rocket fuel. Perchlorate salts are also commonly produced by reacting perchloric acid with bases, such as ammonium hydroxide or sodium hydroxide. Ammonium perchlorate, which is highly valued for high performance rocket propellants, can also be produced via an electrochemical process.

Perchlorate esters are formed in the presence of a nucleophilic catalyst via a perchlorate salt's nucleophilic substitution onto an alkylating agent.

== Uses ==
- The dominant use of perchlorates is as oxidizers in propellants for rockets, fireworks and highway flares. Of particular value is ammonium perchlorate composite propellant as a component of solid rocket fuel. In a related but smaller application, perchlorates are used extensively within the pyrotechnics industry and in certain munitions and for the manufacture of matches. Martian perchlorates might also be used to produce fuel on that planet.
- Perchlorate is used to control static electricity in food packaging. Sprayed onto containers it stops statically charged food from clinging to plastic or paper/cardboard surface.
- Niche uses include lithium perchlorate, which decomposes exothermically to produce oxygen, useful in oxygen "candles" on spacecraft, submarines, and in other situations where a reliable backup oxygen supply is needed.
- Potassium perchlorate has, in the past, been used therapeutically to help manage Graves' disease. It impedes production of the thyroid hormones that contain iodine.
- As perchlorate is generally a non-complexing anion and that its sodium salts is particularly soluble, it is commonly used as a background, or supporting, electrolyte in solution chemistry, electrophoresis, and electrochemistry. Although used as a powerful oxidizer in propulsive powders and explosives, quite surprisingly, the perchlorate anion is a weak oxidant in aqueous solution because of kinetics limitations severely hindering the electron transfer.

== Chemical properties ==
The perchlorate ion is the least redox reactive of the generalized chlorates. Perchlorate contains chlorine in its highest oxidation number (+7). A table of reduction potentials of the four chlorates shows that, contrary to expectation, perchlorate in aqueous solution is the weakest oxidant among the four.

Ion	Acidic reaction	E° (V)	Neutral/basic reaction	E° (V)
Hypochlorite	2 H^{+} + 2 HOCl + 2 e^{−} → Cl_{2} (g) + 2 H_{2}O	1.63	ClO^{−} + H_{2}O + 2 e^{−} → Cl^{−} + 2 OH^{−}	0.89
Chlorite	6 H^{+} + 2 HOClO + 6 e^{−} → Cl_{2} (g) + 4 H_{2}O	1.64	ClO^{−}_{2} + 2 H_{2}O + 4 e^{−} → Cl^{−} + 4 OH^{−}	0.78
Chlorate	12 H^{+} + 2 ClO^{−}_{3} + 10 e^{−} → Cl_{2} (g) + 6 H_{2}O	1.47	ClO^{−}_{3} + 3 H_{2}O + 6 e^{−} → Cl^{−} + 6 OH^{−}	0.63
Perchlorate	16 H^{+} + 2 ClO^{−}_{4} + 14 e^{−} → Cl_{2} (g) + 8 H_{2}O	1.42	ClO^{−}_{4} + 4 H_{2}O + 8 e^{−} → Cl^{−} + 8 OH^{−}	0.56

These data show that the perchlorate and chlorate are stronger oxidizers in acidic conditions than in basic conditions.

Gas phase measurements of heats of reaction (which allow computation of Δ_{f}H°) of various chlorine oxides do follow the expected trend wherein Cl_{2}O_{7} exhibits the largest endothermic value of Δ_{f}H° (238.1 kJ/mol) while Cl_{2}O exhibits the lowest endothermic value of Δ_{f}H° (80.3 kJ/mol).

=== Weak base and weak coordinating anion ===
As perchloric acid is one of the strongest mineral acids, perchlorate is a very weak base in the sense of Brønsted–Lowry acid–base theory. As it is also generally a weakly coordinating anion, perchlorate is commonly used as a background, or supporting, electrolyte.

=== Weak oxidant in aqueous solution due to kinetic limitations ===
Perchlorate compounds oxidize organic compounds, especially when the mixture is heated. The explosive decomposition of ammonium perchlorate is catalyzed by metals and heat.

As perchlorate is a weak Lewis base (i.e., a weak electron pair donor) and a weak nucleophilic anion, it is also a very weakly coordinating anion. This is why it is often used as a supporting electrolyte to study the complexation and the chemical speciation of many cations in aqueous solution or in electroanalytical methods (voltammetry, electrophoresis…). Although the perchlorate reduction is thermodynamically favorable (∆G < 0; E° > 0), and that ClO^{−}_{4} is expected to be a strong oxidant, most often in aqueous solution, it is practically an inert species behaving as an extremely slow oxidant because of severe kinetics limitations. The metastable character of perchlorate in the presence of reducing cations such as Fe^{2+} in solution is due to the difficulty to form an activated complex facilitating the electron transfer and the exchange of oxo groups in the opposite direction. These strongly hydrated cations cannot form a sufficiently stable coordination bridge with one of the four oxo groups of the perchlorate anion. Although thermodynamically a mild reductant, Fe^{2+} ion exhibits a stronger trend to remain coordinated by water molecules to form the corresponding hexa-aquo complex in solution. The high activation energy of the cation binding with perchlorate to form a transient inner sphere complex more favourable to electron transfer considerably hinders the redox reaction. The redox reaction rate is limited by the formation of a favorable activated complex involving an oxo-bridge between the perchlorate anion and the metallic cation. It depends on the molecular orbital rearrangement (HOMO and LUMO orbitals) necessary for a fast oxygen atom transfer (OAT) and the associated electron transfer as studied experimentally by Henry Taube (1983 Nobel Prize in Chemistry) and theoretically by Rudolph A. Marcus (1992 Nobel Prize in Chemistry), both awarded for their respective works on the mechanisms of electron-transfer reactions with metal complexes and in chemical systems.

In contrast to the Fe^{2+} cations which remain unoxidized in deaerated perchlorate aqueous solutions free of dissolved oxygen, other cations such as Ru(II) and Ti(III) can form a more stable bridge between the metal centre and one of the oxo groups of ClO^{−}_{4}. In the inner sphere electron transfer mechanism to observe the perchlorate reduction, the ClO^{−}_{4} anion must quickly transfer an oxygen atom to the reducing cation. When it is the case, metallic cations can readily reduce perchlorate in solution. Ru(II) can reduce ClO^{−}_{4} to ClO^{−}_{3}, while V(II), V(III), Mo(III), Cr(II) and Ti(III) can reduce ClO^{−}_{4} to Cl^{−}.

Some metal complexes, especially those of rhenium, and some metalloenzymes can catalyze the reduction of perchlorate under mild conditions. Perchlorate reductase (see below), a molybdoenzyme, also catalyzes the reduction of perchlorate. Both the Re- and Mo-based catalysts operate via metal-oxo intermediates.

=== Microbiology ===
Over 40 phylogenetically and metabolically diverse microorganisms capable of growth using perchlorate as an electron acceptor have been isolated since 1996. Most originate from the Pseudomonadota, but others include the Bacillota, Moorella perchloratireducens and Sporomusa sp., and the archaeon Archaeoglobus fulgidus. With the exception of A. fulgidus, microbes that grow via perchlorate reduction utilize the enzymes perchlorate reductase and chlorite dismutase, which collectively take perchlorate to chloride. In the process, free oxygen (O_{2}) is generated.

== Natural abundance ==
=== Terrestrial abundance ===
Perchlorate is created by lightning discharges in the presence of chloride. Perchlorate has been detected in rain and snow samples from Florida and Lubbock, Texas.

Naturally occurring perchlorate at its most abundant can be found commingled with deposits of sodium nitrate in the Atacama Desert of northern Chile. These deposits have been heavily mined as sources for nitrate-based fertilizers. Chilean nitrate is in fact estimated to be the source of around 81,000 tonnes (89,000 tons) of perchlorate imported to the U.S. (1909–1997). Results from surveys of ground water, ice, and relatively unperturbed deserts have been used to estimate a 100,000 to 3,000,000 tonnes (110,000 to 3,310,000 tons) "global inventory" of natural perchlorate presently on Earth.

=== On Mars ===
Perchlorate was detected in Martian soil at the level of ~0.6% by weight. It was shown that at the Phoenix landing site it was present as a mixture of 60% Ca(ClO_{4})_{2} and 40% Mg(ClO_{4})_{2}. These salts, formed from perchlorates, act as antifreeze and substantially lower the freezing point of water. Based on the temperature and pressure conditions on present-day Mars at the Phoenix lander site, conditions would allow a perchlorate salt solution to be stable in liquid form for a few hours each day during the summer.

The possibility that the perchlorate was a contaminant brought from Earth was eliminated by several lines of evidence. The Phoenix retro-rockets used ultra pure hydrazine and launch propellants consisting of ammonium perchlorate or ammonium nitrate. Sensors on board Phoenix found no traces of ammonium nitrate, and thus the nitrate in the quantities present in all three soil samples is indigenous to the Martian soil. Perchlorate is widespread in Martian soils at concentrations between 0.5 and 1%. At such concentrations, perchlorate could be an important source of oxygen, but it could also become a critical chemical hazard to astronauts.

In 2006, a mechanism was proposed for the formation of perchlorates that is particularly relevant to the discovery of perchlorate at the Phoenix lander site. It was shown that soils with high concentrations of chloride converted to perchlorate in the presence of titanium dioxide and sunlight/ultraviolet light. The conversion was reproduced in the lab using chloride-rich soils from Death Valley. Other experiments have demonstrated that the formation of perchlorate is associated with wide band gap semiconducting oxides. In 2014, it was shown that perchlorate and chlorate can be produced from chloride minerals under Martian conditions via UV using only NaCl and silicate.

Further findings of perchlorate and chlorate in the Martian meteorite EETA79001 and by the Mars Curiosity rover in 2012-2013 support the notion that perchlorates are globally distributed throughout the Martian surface. With concentrations approaching 0.5% and exceeding toxic levels on Martian soil, Martian perchlorates would present a serious challenge to human settlement, as well as microorganisms. On the other hand, the perchlorate would provide a convenient source of oxygen for the settlements.

On September 28, 2015, NASA announced that analyses of spectral data from the Compact Reconnaissance Imaging Spectrometer for Mars instrument (CRISM) on board the Mars Reconnaissance Orbiter from four different locations where recurring slope lineae (RSL) are present found evidence for hydrated salts. The hydrated salts most consistent with the spectral absorption features are magnesium perchlorate, magnesium chlorate and sodium perchlorate. The findings strongly support the hypothesis that RSL form as a result of contemporary water activity on Mars.

== Contamination in environment ==
Perchlorates are of concern because of uncertainties about toxicity and health effects at low levels in drinking water, impact on ecosystems, and indirect exposure pathways for humans due to accumulation in vegetables. They are water-soluble, exceedingly mobile in aqueous systems, and can persist for many decades under typical groundwater and surface water conditions.

=== Industrial origin ===
Perchlorates are used mostly in rocket propellants but also in disinfectants, bleaching agents, and herbicides. Perchlorate contamination is caused during both the manufacture and ignition of rockets and fireworks. Fireworks are also a source of perchlorate in lakes. Removal and recovery methods of these compounds from explosives and rocket propellants include high-pressure water washout, which generates aqueous ammonium perchlorate.

=== In U.S. drinking water ===
In 2000, perchlorate contamination beneath the former flare manufacturing plant Olin Corporation Flare Facility, Morgan Hill, California was first discovered several years after the plant had closed. The plant had used potassium perchlorate as one of the ingredients during its 40 years of operation. By late 2003, the State of California and the Santa Clara Valley Water District had confirmed a groundwater plume currently extending over nine miles through residential and agricultural communities. The California Regional Water Quality Control Board and the Santa Clara Valley Water District have engaged in a major outreach effort, a water well testing program has been underway for about 1,200 residential, municipal, and agricultural wells. Large ion exchange treatment units are operating in three public water supply systems which include seven municipal wells with perchlorate detection. The potentially responsible parties, Olin Corporation and Standard Fuse Incorporated, have been supplying bottled water to nearly 800 households with private wells, and the Regional Water Quality Control Board has been overseeing cleanup efforts.

The source of perchlorate in California was mainly attributed to two manufacturers in the southeast portion of the Las Vegas Valley in Nevada, where perchlorate has been produced for industrial use. This led to perchlorate release into Lake Mead in Nevada and the Colorado River which affected regions of Nevada, California and Arizona, where water from this reservoir is used for consumption, irrigation and recreation for approximately half the population of these states. Lake Mead has been attributed as the source of 90% of the perchlorate in Southern Nevada's drinking water. Based on sampling, perchlorate has been affecting 20 million people, with highest detection in Texas, southern California, New Jersey, and Massachusetts, but intensive sampling of the Great Plains and other middle state regions may lead to revised estimates with additional affected regions. An action level of 18 μg/L has been adopted by several affected states.

In 2001, the chemical was detected at levels as high as 5 μg/L at Joint Base Cape Cod (formerly Massachusetts Military Reservation), over the Massachusetts then state regulation of 2 μg/L.

As of 2009, low levels of perchlorate had been detected in both drinking water and groundwater in 26 states in the U.S., according to the Environmental Protection Agency (EPA).

=== In food ===
In 2004, the chemical was found in cow's milk in California at an average level of 1.3 parts per billion (ppb, or μg/L), which may have entered the cows through feeding on crops exposed to water containing perchlorates. A 2005 study suggested human breast milk had an average of 10.5 μg/L of perchlorate.

=== From minerals and other natural occurrences ===
In some places, there is no clear source of perchlorate, and it may be naturally occurring. Natural perchlorate on Earth was first identified in terrestrial nitrate deposits /fertilizers of the Atacama Desert in Chile as early as the 1880s and for a long time considered a unique perchlorate source. The perchlorate released from historic use of Chilean nitrate based fertilizer which the U.S.imported by the hundreds of tons in the early 19th century can still be found in some groundwater sources of the United States, for example Long Island, New York. Recent improvements in analytical sensitivity using ion chromatography based techniques have revealed a more widespread presence of natural perchlorate, particularly in subsoils of Southwest USA, salt evaporites in California and Nevada, Pleistocene groundwater in New Mexico, and even present in extremely remote places such as Antarctica. The data from these studies and others indicate that natural perchlorate is globally deposited on Earth with the subsequent accumulation and transport governed by the local hydrologic conditions.

Despite its importance to environmental contamination, the specific source and processes involved in natural perchlorate production remain poorly understood. Laboratory experiments in conjunction with isotopic studies have implied that perchlorate may be produced on earth by oxidation of chlorine species through pathways involving ozone or its photochemical products. Other studies have suggested that perchlorate can also be formed by lightning activated oxidation of chloride aerosols (e.g., chloride in sea salt sprays), and ultraviolet or thermal oxidation of chlorine (e.g., bleach solutions used in swimming pools) in water.

=== From nitrate fertilizers ===
Although perchlorate as an environmental contaminant is usually associated with the manufacture, storage, and testing of solid rocket motors, contamination of perchlorate has been focused as a side effect of the use of natural nitrate fertilizer and its release into ground water. The use of naturally contaminated nitrate fertilizer contributes to the infiltration of perchlorate anions into the ground water and threaten the water supplies of many regions in the US.

One of the main sources of perchlorate contamination from natural nitrate fertilizer use was found to come from the fertilizer derived from Chilean caliche (calcium carbonate), because Chile has rich source of naturally occurring perchlorate anion. Perchlorate concentration was the highest in Chilean nitrate, ranging from 3.3 to 3.98%. Perchlorate in the solid fertilizer ranged from 0.7 to 2.0 mg g^{−1}, variation of less than a factor of 3 and it is estimated that sodium nitrate fertilizers derived from Chilean caliche contain approximately 0.5–2 mg g^{−1} of perchlorate anion. The direct ecological effect of perchlorate is not well known; its impact can be influenced by factors including rainfall and irrigation, dilution, natural attenuation, soil adsorption, and bioavailability. Quantification of perchlorate concentrations in nitrate fertilizer components via ion chromatography revealed that in horticultural fertilizer components contained perchlorate ranging between 0.1 and 0.46%.

== Environmental cleanup ==
There have been many attempts to eliminate perchlorate contamination. Current remediation technologies for perchlorate have downsides of high costs and difficulty in operation. Thus, there have been interests in developing systems that would offer economic and green alternatives.

=== Treatment ex situ and in situ ===
Several technologies can remove perchlorate, via treatments ex situ (away from the location) and in situ (at the location).

Ex situ treatments include ion exchange using perchlorate-selective or nitrite-specific resins, bioremediation using packed-bed or fluidized-bed bioreactors, and membrane technologies via electrodialysis and reverse osmosis. In ex situ treatment via ion exchange, contaminants are attracted and adhere to the ion exchange resin because such resins and ions of contaminants have opposite charge. As the ion of the contaminant adheres to the resin, another charged ion is expelled into the water being treated, in which then ion is exchanged for the contaminant. Ion exchange technology has advantages of being well-suitable for perchlorate treatment and high volume throughput but has a downside that it does not treat chlorinated solvents. In addition, ex situ technology of liquid phase carbon adsorption is employed, where granular activated carbon (GAC) is used to eliminate low levels of perchlorate and pretreatment may be required in arranging GAC for perchlorate elimination.

In situ treatments, such as bioremediation via perchlorate-selective microbes and permeable reactive barrier, are also being used to treat perchlorate. In situ bioremediation has advantages of minimal above-ground infrastructure and its ability to treat chlorinated solvents, perchlorate, nitrate, and RDX simultaneously. However, it has a downside that it may negatively affect secondary water quality. In situ technology of phytoremediation could also be utilized, even though perchlorate phytoremediation mechanism is not fully founded yet.

Bioremediation using perchlorate-reducing bacteria, which reduce perchlorate ions to harmless chloride, has also been proposed.

== Health effects ==
=== Thyroid inhibition ===
Perchlorate is a potent competitive inhibitor of the thyroid sodium-iodide symporter. Thus, it has been used to treat hyperthyroidism since the 1950s. At very high doses (70,000–300,000 ppb) the administration of potassium perchlorate was considered the standard of care in the United States, and remains the approved pharmacologic intervention for many countries.

In large amounts perchlorate interferes with iodine uptake into the thyroid gland. In adults, the thyroid gland helps regulate the metabolism by releasing hormones, while in children, the thyroid helps in proper development. The NAS, in its 2005 report, Health Implications of Perchlorate Ingestion, emphasized that this effect, also known as Iodide Uptake Inhibition (IUI) is not an adverse health effect. However, in January 2008, California's Department of Toxic Substances Control stated that perchlorate is becoming a serious threat to human health and water resources. In 2010, the EPA's Office of the Inspector General determined that the agency's own perchlorate reference dose (RfD) of 24.5 parts per billion protects against all human biological effects from exposure, as the federal government is responsible for all US military base groundwater contamination. This finding was due to a significant shift in policy at the EPA in basing its risk assessment on non-adverse effects such as IUI instead of adverse effects. The Office of the Inspector General also found that because the EPA's perchlorate reference dose is conservative and protective of human health further reducing perchlorate exposure below the reference dose does not effectively lower risk.

Because of ammonium perchlorate's adverse effects upon children, Massachusetts set its maximum allowed limit of ammonium perchlorate in drinking water at 2 parts per billion (2 ppb = 2 micrograms per liter).

Perchlorate affects only thyroid hormone. Because it is neither stored nor metabolized, effects of perchlorate on the thyroid gland are reversible, though effects on brain development from lack of thyroid hormone in fetuses, newborns, and children are not.

Toxic effects of perchlorate have been studied in a survey of industrial plant workers who had been exposed to perchlorate, compared to a control group of other industrial plant workers who had no known exposure to perchlorate. After undergoing multiple tests, workers exposed to perchlorate were found to have a significant systolic blood pressure rise compared to the workers who were not exposed to perchlorate, as well as a significant decreased thyroid function compared to the control workers.

A study involving healthy adult volunteers determined that at levels above 0.007 milligrams per kilogram per day (mg/(kg·d)), perchlorate can temporarily inhibit the thyroid gland's ability to absorb iodine from the bloodstream ("iodide uptake inhibition", thus perchlorate is a known goitrogen). The EPA converted this dose into a reference dose of 0.0007 mg/(kg·d) by dividing this level by the standard intraspecies uncertainty factor of 10. The agency then calculated a "drinking water equivalent level" of 24.5 ppb by assuming a person weighs 70 kg (150 lb) and consumes 2 L (0.44 imp gal; 0.53 US gal) of drinking water per day over a lifetime.

In 2006, a study reported a statistical association between environmental levels of perchlorate and changes in thyroid hormones of women with low iodine. The study authors were careful to point out that hormone levels in all the study subjects remained within normal ranges. The authors also indicated that they did not originally normalize their findings for creatinine, which would have essentially accounted for fluctuations in the concentrations of one-time urine samples like those used in this study. When the Blount research was re-analyzed with the creatinine adjustment made, the study population limited to women of reproductive age, and results not shown in the original analysis, any remaining association between the results and perchlorate intake disappeared. Soon after the revised Blount Study was released, Robert Utiger, a doctor with the Harvard Institute of Medicine, testified before the US Congress and stated: "I continue to believe that that reference dose, 0.007 milligrams per kilo (24.5 ppb), which includes a factor of 10 to protect those who might be more vulnerable, is quite adequate."

In 2014, a study was published, showing that environmental exposure to perchlorate in pregnant women with hypothyroidism is associated with a significant risk of low IQ in their children.

=== Lung toxicity ===
Some studies suggest that perchlorate has toxic effects against lungs (pulmonary toxicity) as well. Studies have been performed on rabbits where perchlorate has been injected into the trachea. The lung tissue was removed and analyzed, and it was found that perchlorate injected lung tissue showed several adverse effects when compared to the control group that had been intratracheally injected with saline. Adverse effects included inflammatory infiltrates, alveolar collapse, subpleural thickening, and lymphocyte proliferation.

=== Aplastic anemia ===
In the early 1960s, potassium perchlorate used to treat Graves' disease was implicated in the development of aplastic anemia—a condition where the bone marrow fails to produce new blood cells in sufficient quantity—in thirteen patients, seven of whom died. Subsequent investigations have indicated the connection between administration of potassium perchlorate and development of aplastic anemia to be "equivocable at best", which means that the benefit of treatment, if it is the only known treatment, outweighs the risk, and it appeared a contaminant poisoned the 13.

== Regulation in the U.S. ==
=== Water ===
In 1998, perchlorate was included in the U.S. EPA Contaminant Candidate List, primarily due to its detection in California drinking water.

In 2002, the EPA completed its draft toxicological review of perchlorate and proposed a reference dose of 0.00003 milligrams per kilogram per day (mg/kg/day) based primarily on studies that identified neurodevelopmental deficits in rat pups. These deficits were linked to maternal exposure to perchlorate.

In 2003, a federal district court in California found that the Comprehensive Environmental Response, Compensation and Liability Act applied, because perchlorate is ignitable, and therefore was a "characteristic" hazardous waste.

Subsequently, the U.S. National Research Council of the National Academy of Sciences (NAS) reviewed the health implications of perchlorate, and in 2005 proposed a much higher reference dose of 0.0007 mg/kg/day based primarily on a 2002 study by Greer et al. During that study, 37 adult human subjects were split into four exposure groups exposed to 0.007 (7 subjects), 0.02 (10 subjects), 0.1 (10 subjects), and 0.5 (10 subjects) mg/kg/day. Significant decreases in iodide uptake were found in the three highest exposure groups. Iodide uptake was not significantly reduced in the lowest exposed group, but four of the seven subjects in this group experienced inhibited iodide uptake. In 2005, the RfD proposed by NAS was accepted by EPA and added to its integrated risk information system (IRIS).

1. The NAS report described the level of lowest exposure from Greer et al. as a "no-observed-effect level" (NOEL). However, there was actually an effect at that level although not statistically significant largely due to small size of study population (four of seven subjects showed a slight decrease in iodide uptake).
2. Reduced iodide uptake was not considered to be an adverse effect, even though it is a precursor to an adverse effect, hypothyroidism. Therefore, additional safety factors, would be necessary when extrapolating from the point of departure to the RfD.
3. Consideration of data uncertainty was insufficient because the Greer, et al. study reflected only a 14-day exposure (=acute) to healthy adults and no additional safety factors were considered to protect sensitive subpopulations like for example, breastfeeding newborns.

Although there has generally been consensus with the Greer et al. study, there has been no consensus with regard to developing a perchlorate RfD. One of the key differences results from how the point of departure is viewed (i.e., NOEL or "lowest-observed-adverse-effect level", LOAEL), or whether a benchmark dose should be used to derive the RfD. Defining the point of departure as a NOEL or LOAEL has implications when it comes to applying appropriate safety factors to the point of departure to derive the RfD.

In early 2006, EPA issued a "Cleanup Guidance" and recommended a Drinking Water Equivalent Level (DWEL) for perchlorate of 24.5 μg/L. Both DWEL and Cleanup Guidance were based on a 2005 review of the existing research by the National Academy of Sciences (NAS).

Lacking a federal drinking water standard, several states subsequently published their own standards for perchlorate including Massachusetts in 2006 and California in 2007. Other states, including Arizona, Maryland, Nevada, New Mexico, New York, and Texas have established non-enforceable, advisory levels for perchlorate.

In 2008, EPA issued an interim drinking water health advisory for perchlorate and with it a guidance and analysis concerning the impacts on the environment and drinking water. California also issued guidance regarding perchlorate use. Both the Department of Defense and some environmental groups voiced questions about the NAS report, but no credible science has emerged to challenge the NAS findings.

In February 2008, the U.S. Food and Drug Administration (FDA) reported that U.S. toddlers on average were being exposed to more than half of EPA's safe dose from food alone. In March 2009, a Centers for Disease Control study found 15 brands of infant formula contaminated with perchlorate and that combined with existing perchlorate drinking water contamination, infants could be at risk for perchlorate exposure above the levels considered safe by EPA.

In 2010, the Massachusetts Department of Environmental Protection set a 10 fold lower RfD (0.07 μg/kg/day) than the NAS RfD using a much higher uncertainty factor of 100. They also calculated an Infant drinking water value, which neither US EPA nor CalEPA had done.

On February 11, 2011, EPA determined that perchlorate meets the Safe Drinking Water Act criteria for regulation as a contaminant. The agency found that perchlorate may have an adverse effect on the health of persons and is known to occur in public water systems with a frequency and at levels that it presents a public health concern. Since then EPA has continued to determine what level of contamination is appropriate. EPA prepared extensive responses to submitted public comments.

In 2016, the Natural Resources Defense Council (NRDC) filed a lawsuit to accelerate EPA's regulation of perchlorate.

In 2019, EPA proposed a Maximum Contaminant Level of 0.056 mg/L for public water systems.

On June 18, 2020, EPA announced that it was withdrawing its 2011 regulatory determination and its 2019 proposal, stating that it had taken "proactive steps" with state and local governments to address perchlorate contamination. In September 2020 NRDC filed suit against EPA for its failure to regulate perchlorate, and stated that 26 million people may be affected by perchlorate in their drinking water. On March 31, 2022, the EPA announced that a review confirmed its 2020 decision. Following the NRDC lawsuit, in 2023 the US Court of Appeals for the DC Circuit ordered EPA to develop a perchlorate standard for public water systems. EPA published a proposed rule for perchlorate on January 6, 2026. The court order requires the agency to issue a final rule in 2027.

== Covalent perchlorates ==
Although typically found as a non-coordinating anion, a few metal complexes are known. Hexaperchloratoaluminate and tetraperchloratoaluminate are strong oxidising agents.

Several perchlorate esters are known. For example, methyl perchlorate is a high energy material that is a strong alkylating agent. Chlorine perchlorate is a covalent inorganic analog.

== Safety ==
As discussed above, iodide is competitor in the thyroid glands. In the presence of reductants, perchlorate forms potentially explosive mixtures. The PEPCON disaster destroyed a production plant for ammonium perchlorate when a fire caused the ammonium perchlorate stored on site to react with the aluminum that the storage tanks were constructed with and explode.
