= Bromine compounds =

Any chemical compound having at least one bromine atom

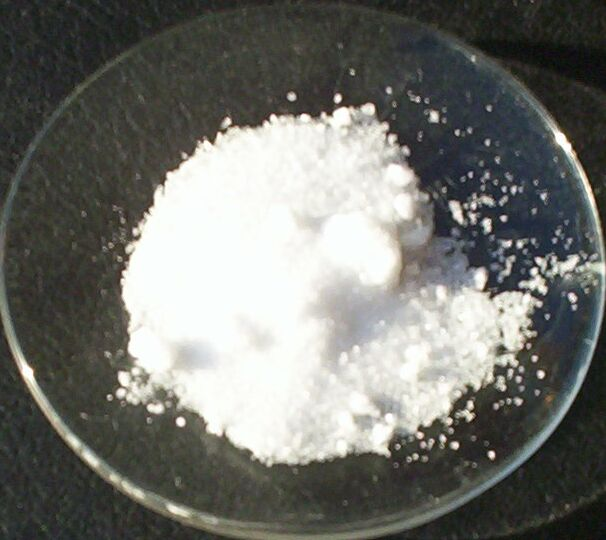
A sample of sodium bromide, a compound of bromine

Bromine compounds are compounds containing the element bromine (Br). These compounds usually form the −1, +1, +3 and +5 oxidation states. Bromine is intermediate in reactivity between chlorine and iodine, and is one of the most reactive elements. Bond energies to bromine tend to be lower than those to chlorine but higher than those to iodine, and bromine is a weaker oxidising agent than chlorine but a stronger one than iodine. This can be seen from the standard electrode potentials of the X_{2}/X^{−} couples (F, +2.866 V; Cl, +1.395 V; Br, +1.087 V; I, +0.615 V; At, approximately +0.3 V). Bromination often leads to higher oxidation states than iodination but lower or equal oxidation states to chlorination. Bromine tends to react with compounds including M–M, M–H, or M–C bonds to form M–Br bonds.

Halogen bond energies (kJ/mol)
X	XX	HX	BX_{3}	AlX_{3}	CX_{4}
F	159	574	645	582	456
Cl	243	428	444	427	327
Br	193	363	368	360	272
I	151	294	272	285	239

== Hydrogen bromide ==
The simplest compound of bromine is hydrogen bromide, HBr. It is mainly used in the production of inorganic bromides and alkyl bromides, and as a catalyst for many reactions in organic chemistry. Industrially, it is mainly produced by the reaction of hydrogen gas with bromine gas at 200–400 °C with a platinum catalyst. However, reduction of bromine with red phosphorus is a more practical way to produce hydrogen bromide in the laboratory:

2 P + 6 H_{2}O + 3 Br_{2} → 6 HBr + 2 H_{3}PO_{3}
H_{3}PO_{3} + H_{2}O + Br_{2} → 2 HBr + H_{3}PO_{4}

At room temperature, hydrogen bromide is a colourless gas, like all the hydrogen halides apart from hydrogen fluoride, since hydrogen cannot form strong hydrogen bonds to the large and only mildly electronegative bromine atom; however, weak hydrogen bonding is present in solid crystalline hydrogen bromide at low temperatures, similar to the hydrogen fluoride structure, before disorder begins to prevail as the temperature is raised. Aqueous hydrogen bromide is known as hydrobromic acid, which is a strong acid (pK_{a} = −9) because the hydrogen bonds to bromine are too weak to inhibit dissociation. The HBr/H_{2}O system also involves many hydrates HBr·nH_{2}O for n = 1, 2, 3, 4, and 6, which are essentially salts of bromine anions and hydronium cations. Hydrobromic acid forms an azeotrope with boiling point 124.3 °C at 47.63 g HBr per 100 g solution; thus hydrobromic acid cannot be concentrated beyond this point by distillation.

Unlike hydrogen fluoride, anhydrous liquid hydrogen bromide is difficult to work with as a solvent, because its boiling point is low, it has a small liquid range, its dielectric constant is low and it does not dissociate appreciably into H_{2}Br^{+} and HBr^{−}_{2} ions – the latter, in any case, are much less stable than the bifluoride ions (HF^{−}_{2}) due to the very weak hydrogen bonding between hydrogen and bromine, though its salts with very large and weakly polarising cations such as Cs^{+} and NR^{+}_{4} (R = Me, Et, Bu^{n}) may still be isolated. Anhydrous hydrogen bromide is a poor solvent, only able to dissolve small molecular compounds such as nitrosyl chloride and phenol, or salts with very low lattice energies such as tetraalkylammonium halides.

== Other binary bromides ==
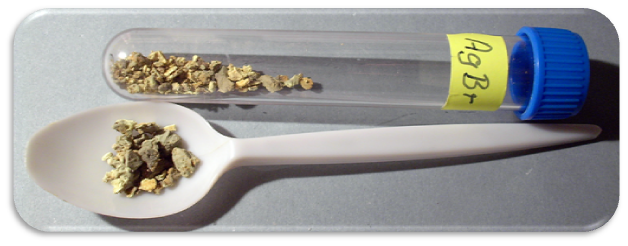
Silver bromide (AgBr)

Nearly all elements in the periodic table form binary bromides. The exceptions are decidedly in the minority and stem in each case from one of three causes: extreme inertness and reluctance to participate in chemical reactions (the noble gases, with the exception of xenon in the very unstable XeBr_{2}; extreme nuclear instability hampering chemical investigation before decay and transmutation (many of the heaviest elements beyond bismuth); and having an electronegativity higher than bromine's (oxygen, nitrogen, fluorine, and chlorine), so that the resultant binary compounds are formally not bromides but rather oxides, nitrides, fluorides, or chlorides of bromine. (Nonetheless, nitrogen tribromide is named as a bromide as it is analogous to the other nitrogen trihalides.)

Bromination of metals with Br_{2} tends to yield lower oxidation states than chlorination with Cl_{2} when a variety of oxidation states is available. Bromides can be made by reaction of an element or its oxide, hydroxide, or carbonate with hydrobromic acid, and then dehydrated by mildly high temperatures combined with either low pressure or anhydrous hydrogen bromide gas. These methods work best when the bromide product is stable to hydrolysis; otherwise, the possibilities include high-temperature oxidative bromination of the element with bromine or hydrogen bromide, high-temperature bromination of a metal oxide or other halide by bromine, a volatile metal bromide, carbon tetrabromide, or an organic bromide. For example, niobium(V) oxide reacts with carbon tetrabromide at 370 °C to form niobium(V) bromide. Another method is halogen exchange in the presence of excess "halogenating reagent", for example:

FeCl_{3} + BBr_{3} (excess) → FeBr_{3} + BCl_{3}

When a lower bromide is wanted, either a higher halide may be reduced using hydrogen or a metal as a reducing agent, or thermal decomposition or disproportionation may be used, as follows:

3 WBr_{5} + Al 3 WBr_{4} + AlBr_{3}
EuBr_{3} + 1/2 H_{2} → EuBr_{2} + HBr
2 TaBr_{4} TaBr_{3} + TaBr_{5}

Most of the bromides of the pre-transition metals (groups 1, 2, and 3, along with the lanthanides and actinides in the +2 and +3 oxidation states) are mostly ionic, while nonmetals tend to form covalent molecular bromides, as do metals in high oxidation states from +3 and above. Silver bromide is very insoluble in water and is thus often used as a qualitative test for bromine.

== Bromine halides ==
The halogens form many binary, diamagnetic interhalogen compounds with stoichiometries XY, XY_{3}, XY_{5}, and XY_{7} (where X is heavier than Y), and bromine is no exception. Bromine forms a monofluoride and monochloride, as well as a trifluoride and pentafluoride. Some cationic and anionic derivatives are also characterised, such as BrF^{−}_{2}, BrCl^{−}_{2}, BrF^{+}_{2}, BrF^{+}_{4}, and BrF^{+}_{6}. Apart from these, some pseudohalides are also known, such as cyanogen bromide (BrCN), bromine thiocyanate (BrSCN), and bromine azide (BrN_{3}).

The pale-brown bromine monofluoride (BrF) is unstable at room temperature, disproportionating quickly and irreversibly into bromine, bromine trifluoride, and bromine pentafluoride. It thus cannot be obtained pure. It may be synthesised by the direct reaction of the elements, or by the comproportionation of bromine and bromine trifluoride at high temperatures. Bromine monochloride (BrCl), a red-brown gas, quite readily dissociates reversibly into bromine and chlorine at room temperature and thus also cannot be obtained pure, though it can be made by the reversible direct reaction of its elements in the gas phase or in carbon tetrachloride. Bromine monofluoride in ethanol readily leads to the monobromination of the aromatic compounds PhX (para-bromination occurs for X = Me, Bu^{t}, OMe, Br; meta-bromination occurs for the deactivating X = –CO_{2}Et, –CHO, –NO_{2}); this is due to heterolytic fission of the Br–F bond, leading to rapid electrophilic bromination by Br^{+}.

At room temperature, bromine trifluoride (BrF_{3}) is a straw-coloured liquid. It may be formed by directly fluorinating bromine at room temperature and is purified through distillation. It reacts violently with water and explodes on contact with flammable materials, but is a less powerful fluorinating reagent than chlorine trifluoride. It reacts vigorously with boron, carbon, silicon, arsenic, antimony, iodine, and sulfur to give fluorides, and will also convert most metals and many metal compounds to fluorides; as such, it is used to oxidise uranium to uranium hexafluoride in the nuclear power industry. Refractory oxides tend to be only partially fluorinated, but here the derivatives KBrF_{4} and BrF_{2}SbF_{6} remain reactive. Bromine trifluoride is a useful nonaqueous ionising solvent, since it readily dissociates to form BrF^{+}_{2} and BrF^{−}_{4} and thus conducts electricity.

Bromine pentafluoride (BrF_{5}) was first synthesised in 1930. It is produced on a large scale by direct reaction of bromine with excess fluorine at temperatures higher than 150 °C, and on a small scale by the fluorination of potassium bromide at 25 °C. It also reacts violently with water and is a very strong fluorinating agent, although chlorine trifluoride is still stronger.

== Polybromine compounds ==
Although dibromine is a strong oxidising agent with a high first ionisation energy, very strong oxidisers such as peroxydisulfuryl fluoride (S_{2}O_{6}F_{2}) can oxidise it to form the cherry-red Br^{+}_{2} cation. A few other bromine cations are known, namely the brown Br^{+}_{3} and dark brown Br^{+}_{5}. The tribromide anion, Br^{−}_{3}, has also been characterised; it is analogous to triiodide. Neutral Br_{2} molecules are incorporated into an adduct with the anionic copper-bromine complex Cu_{2}Br_{6}^{2-}.

== Bromine oxides and oxoacids ==
Standard reduction potentials for aqueous Br species
E°(couple)	a(H^{+}) = 1 (acid)	E°(couple)	a(OH^{−}) = 1 (base)
Br_{2}/Br^{−}	+1.052	Br_{2}/Br^{−}	+1.065
HOBr/Br^{−}	+1.341	BrO^{−}/Br^{−}	+0.760
BrO^{−}_{3}/Br^{−}	+1.399	BrO^{−}_{3}/Br^{−}	+0.584
HOBr/Br_{2}	+1.604	BrO^{−}/Br_{2}	+0.455
BrO^{−}_{3}/Br_{2}	+1.478	BrO^{−}_{3}/Br_{2}	+0.485
BrO^{−}_{3}/HOBr	+1.447	BrO^{−}_{3}/BrO^{−}	+0.492
BrO^{−}_{4}/BrO^{−}_{3}	+1.853	BrO^{−}_{4}/BrO^{−}_{3}	+1.025

Bromine oxides are not as well-characterised as chlorine oxides or iodine oxides, as they are all fairly unstable: it was once thought that they could not exist at all. Dibromine monoxide is a dark-brown solid which, while reasonably stable at −60 °C, decomposes at its melting point of −17.5 °C; it is useful in bromination reactions and may be made from the low-temperature decomposition of bromine dioxide in a vacuum. It oxidises iodine to iodine pentoxide and benzene to 1,4-benzoquinone; in alkaline solutions, it gives the hypobromite anion.

So-called "bromine dioxide", a pale yellow crystalline solid, may be better formulated as bromine perbromate, BrOBrO_{3}. It is thermally unstable above −40 °C, violently decomposing to its elements at 0 °C. Dibromine trioxide, syn-BrOBrO_{2}, is also known; it is the anhydride of hypobromous acid and bromic acid. It is an orange crystalline solid which decomposes above −40 °C; if heated too rapidly, it explodes around 0 °C. A few other unstable radical oxides are also known, as are some poorly characterised oxides, such as dibromine pentoxide, tribromine octoxide, and bromine trioxide.

The four oxoacids, hypobromous acid (HOBr), bromous acid (HOBrO), bromic acid (HOBrO_{2}), and perbromic acid (HOBrO_{3}), are better studied due to their greater stability, though they are only so in aqueous solution. When bromine dissolves in aqueous solution, the following reactions occur:

Br_{2} + H_{2}O	⇌ HOBr + H^{+} + Br^{−}	K_{ac} = 7.2 × 10^{−9} mol^{2} l^{−2}
Br_{2} + 2 OH^{−}	⇌ OBr^{−} + H_{2}O + Br^{−}	K_{alk} = 2 × 10^{8} mol^{−1} l

Hypobromous acid is unstable to disproportionation. The hypobromite ions thus formed disproportionate readily to give bromide and bromate:

3 BrO^{−} ⇌ 2 Br^{−} + BrO^{−}_{3}	K = 10^{15}

Bromous acids and bromites are very unstable, although the strontium and barium bromites are known. More important are the bromates, which are prepared on a small scale by oxidation of bromide by aqueous hypochlorite, and are strong oxidising agents. Unlike chlorates, which very slowly disproportionate to chloride and perchlorate, the bromate anion is stable to disproportionation in both acidic and aqueous solutions. Bromic acid is a strong acid. Bromides and bromates may comproportionate to bromine as follows:

BrO^{−}_{3} + 5 Br^{−} + 6 H^{+} → 3 Br_{2} + 3 H_{2}O

There were many failed attempts to obtain perbromates and perbromic acid, leading to some rationalisations as to why they should not exist, until 1968 when the anion was first synthesised from the radioactive beta decay of unstable ^{83}SeO^{2−}_{4}. Today, perbromates are produced by the oxidation of alkaline bromate solutions by fluorine gas. Excess bromate and fluoride are precipitated as silver bromate and calcium fluoride, and the perbromic acid solution may be purified. The perbromate ion is fairly inert at room temperature but is thermodynamically extremely oxidising, with extremely strong oxidising agents needed to produce it, such as fluorine or xenon difluoride. The Br–O bond in BrO^{−}_{4} is fairly weak, which corresponds to the general reluctance of the 4p elements arsenic, selenium, and bromine to attain their group oxidation state, as they come after the scandide contraction characterised by the poor shielding afforded by the radial-nodeless 3d orbitals.

== Organobromine compounds ==
Structure of N-bromosuccinimide, a common brominating reagent in organic chemistry

Like the other carbon–halogen bonds, the C–Br bond is a common functional group that forms part of core organic chemistry. Formally, compounds with this functional group may be considered organic derivatives of the bromide anion. Due to the difference of electronegativity between bromine (2.96) and carbon (2.55), the carbon atom in a C–Br bond is electron-deficient and thus electrophilic. The reactivity of organobromine compounds resembles but is intermediate between the reactivity of organochlorine and organoiodine compounds. For many applications, organobromides represent a compromise of reactivity and cost.

Organobromides are typically produced by additive or substitutive bromination of other organic precursors. Bromine itself can be used, but due to its toxicity and volatility, safer brominating reagents are normally used, such as N-bromosuccinimide. The principal reactions for organobromides include dehydrobromination, Grignard reactions, reductive coupling, and nucleophilic substitution.

Organobromides are the most common organohalides in nature, even though the concentration of bromide is only 0.3% of that for chloride in sea water, because of the easy oxidation of bromide to the equivalent of Br^{+}, a potent electrophile. The enzyme bromoperoxidase catalyzes this reaction. The oceans are estimated to release 1–2 million tons of bromoform and 56,000 tons of bromomethane annually.

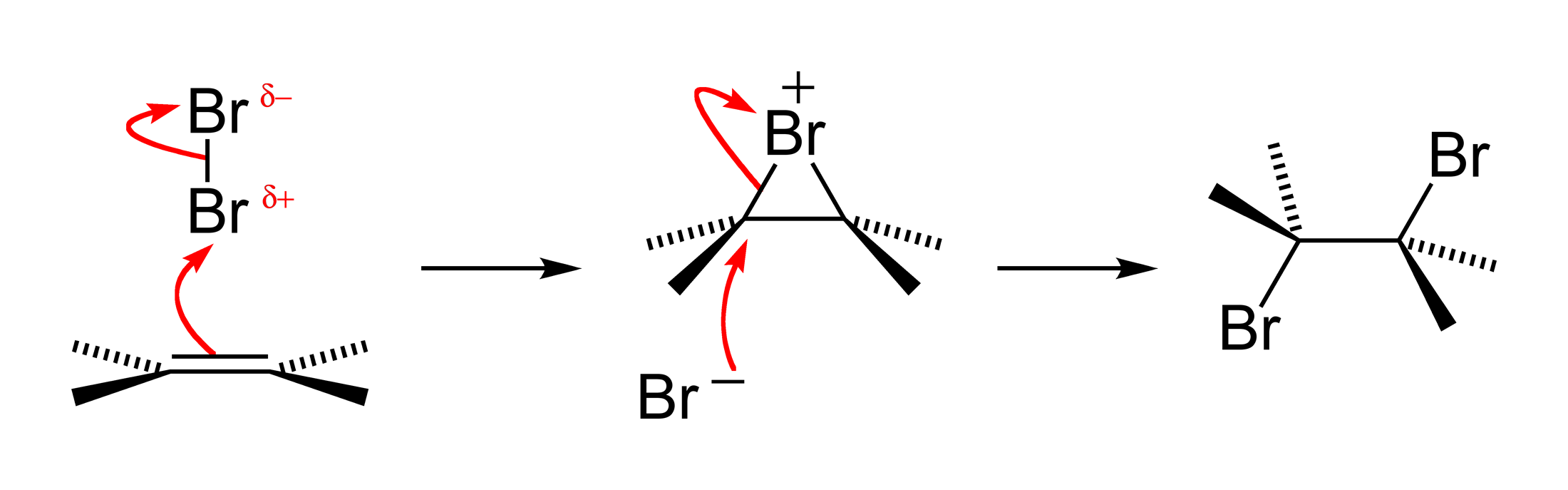
Bromine addition to alkene reaction mechanism

An old qualitative test for the presence of the alkene functional group is that alkenes turn brown aqueous bromine solutions colourless, forming a bromohydrin with some of the dibromoalkane also produced. The reaction passes through a short-lived strongly electrophilic bromonium intermediate. This is an example of a halogen addition reaction.

== See also ==
- Category:Bromine compounds
- Organobromine compounds
