= Bromine oxide =

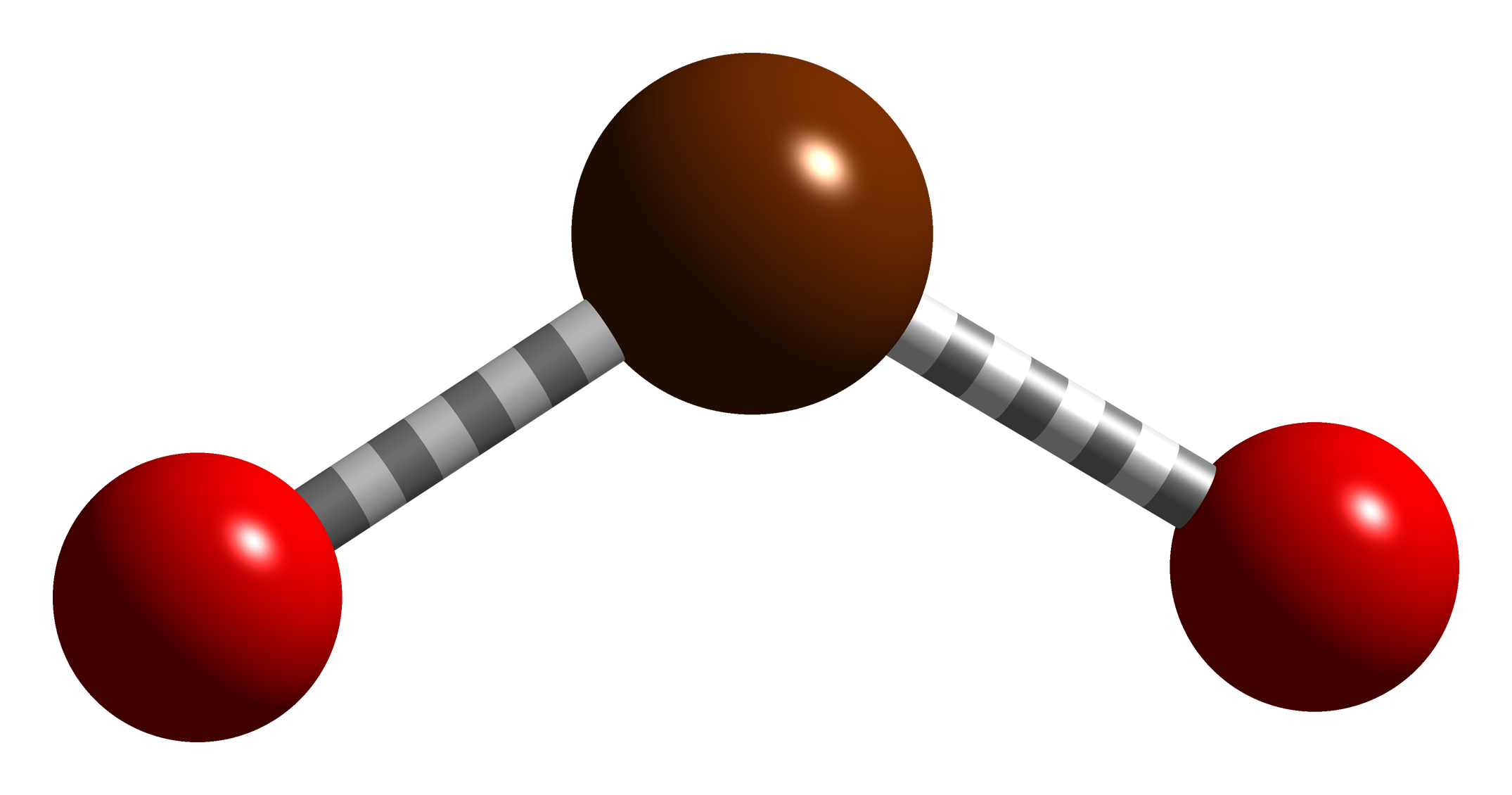
Bromine dioxide (BrO_{2})

Bromine can form several different oxides:

- Dibromine monoxide (Br_{2}O)
- Bromine dioxide (BrO_{2})
- Dibromine trioxide (Br_{2}O_{3})
- Dibromine pentoxide (Br_{2}O_{5})
- Tribromine octoxide (Br_{3}O_{8})

Also, a number of ions are bromine oxides:

- Hypobromite (BrO^{−})
- Bromite (BrO_{2}^{−})
- Bromate (BrO_{3}^{−})
- Perbromate (BrO_{4}^{−})

And the bromine monoxide radical:

- Bromine oxide (BrO)

== See also ==
- Oxygen fluoride
- Chlorine oxide
- Iodine oxide
