= Barium bromite =

Identifiers
CAS Number	14899-01-5
3D model (JSmol)	Interactive image
PubChem CID	140438260
- InChI: InChI=1S/Ba.2BrHO2/c;2*2-1-3/h;2*(H,2,3)/q+2;;/p-2 Key: PGLMIJFEJJTLFA-UHFFFAOYSA-L
- SMILES: [Ba+2].O=[Br][O-].O=[Br][O-]

Properties
Chemical formula	Ba(BrO_{2})_{2}
Molar mass	361.14 g/mol
Appearance	Crystalline solid
Melting point	795 °C (1,463 °F; 1,068 K) (decomposes)

Hazards
- GHS labelling
Pictograms	(GHS07: Exclamation mark)
Signal word	Warning
Hazard statements	H302, H332
- Except where otherwise noted, data are given for materials in their standard state (at 25 °C [77 °F], 100 kPa). Infobox references

Barium bromite is an inorganic compound of barium and the bromite ion, with the chemical formula Ba(BrO_{2})_{2}. It is one of the comparatively few isolable alkaline earth metal bromites. The crystalline compound is commonly obtained as the monohydrate, Ba(BrO_{2})_{2}·H_{2}O.

== Properties ==
Barium bromite is considerably more stable than many other bromite salts. The monohydrate can be stored for extended periods at low temperature, and saturated aqueous solutions have been reported to remain stable for months at room temperature.

On heating, barium bromite eventually decomposes to barium bromide and oxygen. Rapid decomposition occurs above about 795 °C:

Ba(BrO_{2})_{2} → BaBr_{2} + 2 O_{2}

The hydrated salt is less thermally stable; partial decomposition occurs on prolonged heating under reduced pressure at temperatures well below this decomposition temperature.

== Preparation ==
Barium bromite can be prepared by precipitation from solutions of barium chloride and sodium bromite:

BaCl_{2} + 2 NaBrO_{2} → Ba(BrO_{2})_{2}↓ + 2 NaCl

The crude precipitate can be recrystallized from water to give crystalline barium bromite monohydrate.

Another route is the controlled thermal decomposition of barium bromate under an oxygen atmosphere. Barium bromite has been obtained by heating Ba(BrO_{3})_{2} at about 250 °C, with barium bromide formed as an intermediate or coproduct.

The overall process has been represented by the reactions:

Ba(BrO_{3})_{2} → BaBr_{2} + 3 O_{2}

2 Ba(BrO_{3})_{2} + BaBr_{2} → 3 Ba(BrO_{2})_{2}

Also it can be made by the disproportionation of barium hypobromite.

== Applications ==
Barium bromite has been used as a stable precursor for the preparation of alkali metal bromites. For example, treatment with an alkali metal carbonate allows the barium ion to be removed as insoluble barium carbonate, leaving the corresponding soluble bromite in solution.

It has also been investigated as an oxidizing agent and as a source of sodium bromite for textile-processing applications.
