= Bromine =

Bromine, _{35}Br
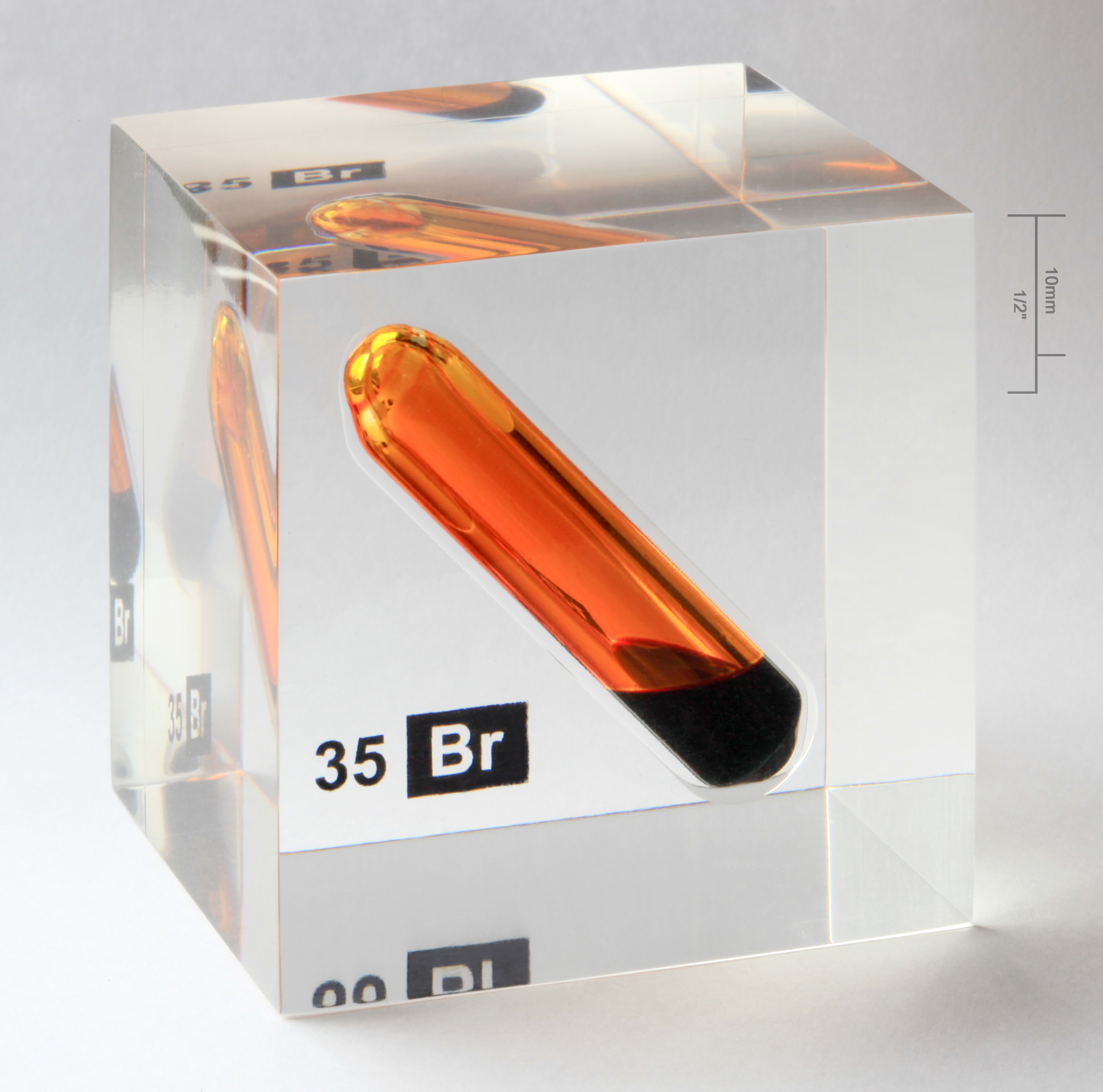
- Liquid and gas bromine inside transparent cube

Bromine
- Pronunciation: /ˈbroʊmiːn, -mɪn, -maɪn/ (BROH-meen, -min, -myne)
- Appearance: reddish-brown liquid

Standard atomic weight A_{r}°(Br)
- [79.901, 79.907]; 79.904±0.003 (abridged)

Bromine in the periodic table
| Hydrogen | | | | | | | | | | | | | | | | | | | | | | | | | | | | | | | Helium |
| Lithium | Beryllium | | | | | | | | | | | | | | | | | | | | | | | | | Boron | Carbon | Nitrogen | Oxygen | Fluorine | Neon |
| Sodium | Magnesium | | | | | | | | | | | | | | | | | | | | | | | | | Aluminium | Silicon | Phosphorus | Sulfur | Chlorine | Argon |
| Potassium | Calcium | | | | | | | | | | | | | | | Scandium | Titanium | Vanadium | Chromium | Manganese | Iron | Cobalt | Nickel | Copper | Zinc | Gallium | Germanium | Arsenic | Selenium | Bromine | Krypton |
| Rubidium | Strontium | | | | | | | | | | | | | | | Yttrium | Zirconium | Niobium | Molybdenum | Technetium | Ruthenium | Rhodium | Palladium | Silver | Cadmium | Indium | Tin | Antimony | Tellurium | Iodine | Xenon |
| Caesium | Barium | Lanthanum | Cerium | Praseodymium | Neodymium | Promethium | Samarium | Europium | Gadolinium | Terbium | Dysprosium | Holmium | Erbium | Thulium | Ytterbium | Lutetium | Hafnium | Tantalum | Tungsten | Rhenium | Osmium | Iridium | Platinum | Gold | Mercury (element) | Thallium | Lead | Bismuth | Polonium | Astatine | Radon |
| Francium | Radium | Actinium | Thorium | Protactinium | Uranium | Neptunium | Plutonium | Americium | Curium | Berkelium | Californium | Einsteinium | Fermium | Mendelevium | Nobelium | Lawrencium | Rutherfordium | Dubnium | Seaborgium | Bohrium | Hassium | Meitnerium | Darmstadtium | Roentgenium | Copernicium | Nihonium | Flerovium | Moscovium | Livermorium | Tennessine | Oganesson |
Cl
↑
Br
↓
I
selenium ← bromine → krypton
- Atomic number (Z): 35
- Group: group 17 (halogens)
- Period: period 4
- Block: p-block
- Electron configuration: [Ar] 3d^{10} 4s^{2} 4p^{5}
- Electrons per shell: 2, 8, 18, 7

Physical properties
- Phase at STP: liquid
- Melting point: (Br_{2}) 265.8 K (−7.2 °C, 19 °F)
- Boiling point: (Br_{2}) 332.0 K (58.8 °C, 137.8 °F)
- Density (near r.t.): Br_{2}, liquid: 3.1028 g/cm^{3}
- Triple point: 265.90 K, 5.8 kPa
- Critical point: 588 K, 10.34 MPa
- Heat of fusion: (Br_{2}) 10.571 kJ/mol
- Heat of vaporisation: (Br_{2}) 29.96 kJ/mol
- Molar heat capacity: 37.845 J/(mol·K) (Br); 75.69 J/(mol·K) (Br_{2})
- Specific heat capacity: 473.631 J/(kg·K) (Br)
Vapour pressure
| P (Pa) | 1 | 10 | 100 | 1 k | 10 k | 100 k |
|---|---|---|---|---|---|---|
| at T (K) | 185 | 201 | 220 | 244 | 276 | 332 |

Atomic properties
- Oxidation states: common: −1, +1, +3, +5 +2, +4, +7
- Electronegativity: Pauling scale: 2.96
- Ionisation energies: 1st: 1139.9 kJ/mol; 2nd: 2103 kJ/mol; 3rd: 3470 kJ/mol
- Atomic radius: empirical: 120 pm
- Covalent radius: 120±3 pm
- Van der Waals radius: 185 pm
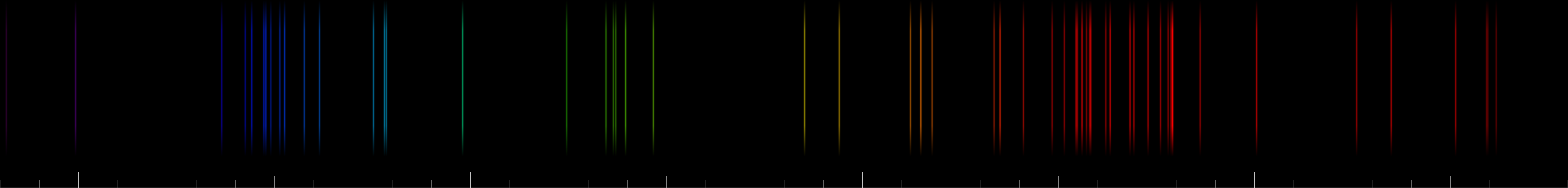
- Spectral lines of bromine

Other properties
- Natural occurrence: primordial
- Crystal structure: orthorhombic (oS8)
- Lattice constants: a = 674.30 pm b = 466.85 pm c = 870.02 pm (at triple point: 269.60 K)
- Thermal conductivity: 0.122 W/(m⋅K)
- Electrical resistivity: 7.8×10^{10} Ω⋅m (at 20 °C)
- Magnetic ordering: diamagnetic
- Molar magnetic susceptibility: −56.4×10^{−6} cm^{3}/mol
- Speed of sound: 206 m/s (at 20 °C)
- CAS Number: 7726-95-6

History
- Naming: from Ancient Greek βρῶμος, 'stench', for its sharp and pungent smell
- Discovery and first isolation: Antoine Jérôme Balard and Carl Jacob Löwig (1825)

Isotopes of bromine
| Main isotopes | | | Decay | |
| Isotope | abundance | half-life (t_{1/2}) | mode | product |
|---|---|---|---|---|
| ^{75}Br | synth | 97 min | β^{+} | ^{75}Se |
| ^{76}Br | synth | 16.2 h | β^{+} | ^{76}Se |
| ^{77}Br | synth | 57.04 h | β^{+} | ^{77}Se |
| ^{79}Br | 50.6% | stable | | |
| ^{80}Br | synth | 17.68 min | β^{−} | ^{80}Kr |
| ^{80}Br | synth | 17.68 min | β^{+} | ^{80}Se |
| ^{80m}Br | synth | 4.4205 h | IT | ^{80}Br |
| ^{81}Br | 49.4% | stable | | |
| ^{82}Br | synth | 35.282 h | β^{−} | ^{82}Kr |

Bromine is a chemical element; its symbol is Br and its atomic number is 35. It is a volatile red-brown liquid at room temperature that evaporates readily to form a similarly coloured vapour. Its properties are intermediate between those of chlorine and iodine. Isolated independently by two chemists, Carl Jacob Löwig (in 1825) and Antoine Jérôme Balard (in 1826), its name was derived from Ancient Greek βρῶμος (bromos) 'stench', referring to its sharp and pungent smell.

Elemental bromine is very reactive and thus does not occur as a free element in nature. Instead, it can be isolated from colourless soluble crystalline mineral halide salts analogous to table salt, a property it shares with the other halogens. While it is rather rare in the Earth's crust, the high solubility of the bromide ion (Br^{−}) has caused its accumulation in the oceans. Commercially the element is easily extracted from brine evaporation ponds, mostly in the United States and Israel. The mass of bromine in the oceans is about one three-hundredth that of chlorine.

At standard conditions for temperature and pressure it is a liquid; the only other element that is liquid is mercury. At high temperatures, organobromine compounds readily dissociate to yield free bromine atoms, a process that stops free radical chemical chain reactions. This effect makes organobromine compounds useful as fire retardants, with more than half the bromine produced worldwide each year put to this purpose. The same property causes ultraviolet sunlight to dissociate volatile organobromine compounds in the atmosphere to yield free bromine atoms, causing ozone depletion. As a result, some organobromine compounds—such as the pesticide methyl bromide—are no longer used. Bromine compounds are still used in well drilling fluids, in photographic film, and as an intermediate in the manufacture of organic chemicals.

Large amounts of bromide salts are toxic from the action of soluble bromide ions, causing bromism. However, bromine is beneficial for human eosinophils, and is an essential trace element for collagen development in all animals. Hundreds of known organobromine compounds are generated by terrestrial and marine plants and animals, and some serve important biological roles. As a pharmaceutical, the simple bromide ion (Br^{−}) has inhibitory effects on the central nervous system, and bromide salts were once a major medical sedative, before replacement by shorter-acting drugs. They retain niche uses as antiepileptics.

== History ==
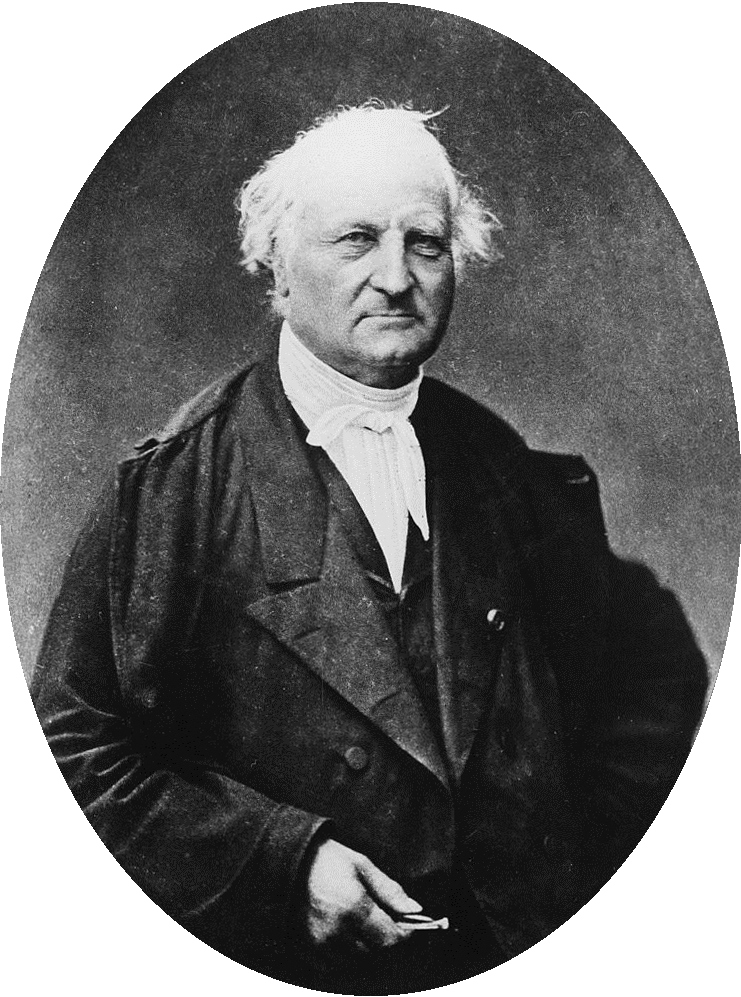
Antoine Balard, one of the discoverers of bromine

Bromine was discovered independently by two chemists, Carl Jacob Löwig and Antoine Balard, in 1825 and 1826, respectively.

Justus von Liebig discovered bromine in 1825, however, he did not recognize that he was looking at an unknown element and mistook it for iodine chloride.

Löwig isolated bromine from a mineral water spring from his hometown Bad Kreuznach in 1825. Löwig used a solution of the mineral salt saturated with chlorine and extracted the bromine with diethyl ether. After evaporation of the ether, a brown liquid remained. With this liquid as a sample of his work he applied for a position in the laboratory of Leopold Gmelin in Heidelberg. The publication of the results was delayed and Balard published his results first.

Balard found bromine chemicals in the ash of seaweed from the salt marshes of Montpellier. The seaweed was used to produce iodine, but also contained bromine. Balard distilled the bromine from a solution of seaweed ash saturated with chlorine. The properties of the resulting substance were intermediate between those of chlorine and iodine; thus he tried to prove that the substance was iodine monochloride (ICl), but after failing to do so he was sure that he had found a new element and named it muride, derived from the Latin word muria ("brine").

After the French chemists Louis Nicolas Vauquelin, Louis Jacques Thénard, and Joseph-Louis Gay-Lussac approved the experiments of the young pharmacist Balard, the results were presented at a lecture of the Académie des Sciences and published in Annales de Chimie et Physique. In his publication, Balard stated that he changed the name from muride to brôme on the proposal of M. Anglada. The name brôme (bromine) derives from the Greek βρῶμος (brômos, "stench"). Other sources claim that the French chemist and physicist Joseph-Louis Gay-Lussac suggested the name brôme for the characteristic smell of the vapours. Bromine was not produced in large quantities until 1858, when the discovery of salt deposits in Stassfurt enabled its production as a by-product of potash.

Apart from some minor medical applications, the first commercial use was the daguerreotype. In 1840, bromine was discovered to have some advantages over the previously used iodine vapour to create the light sensitive silver halide layer in daguerreotypy.

By 1864, a 25% solution of liquid bromine in .75 molar aqueous potassium bromide was widely used to treat gangrene during the American Civil War, before the publications of Joseph Lister and Pasteur.

Potassium bromide and sodium bromide were used as anticonvulsants and sedatives in the late 19th and early 20th centuries, but were gradually superseded by chloral hydrate and then by the barbiturates. In the early years of the First World War, bromine compounds such as xylyl bromide were used as poison gas.

== Properties ==
Bromine is the third halogen, being a nonmetal in group 17 of the periodic table. Its properties are thus similar to those of fluorine, chlorine, and iodine, and tend to be intermediate between those of chlorine and iodine, the two neighbouring halogens. Bromine has the electron configuration [Ar]4s^{2}3d^{10}4p^{5}, with the seven electrons in the fourth and outermost shell acting as its valence electrons. Like all halogens, it is thus one electron short of a full octet, and is hence a strong oxidising agent, reacting with many elements in order to complete its outer shell. Corresponding to periodic trends, it is intermediate in electronegativity between chlorine and iodine (F: 3.98, Cl: 3.16, Br: 2.96, I: 2.66), and is less reactive than chlorine and more reactive than iodine. It is also a weaker oxidising agent than chlorine, but a stronger one than iodine. Conversely, the bromide ion is a weaker reducing agent than iodide, but a stronger one than chloride. These similarities led to chlorine, bromine, and iodine together being classified as one of the original triads of Johann Wolfgang Döbereiner, whose work foreshadowed the periodic law for chemical elements. It is intermediate in atomic radius between chlorine and iodine, and this leads to many of its atomic properties being similarly intermediate in value between chlorine and iodine, such as first ionisation energy, electron affinity, enthalpy of dissociation of the X_{2} molecule (X = Cl, Br, I), ionic radius, and X–X bond length. The volatility of bromine accentuates its very penetrating, choking, and unpleasant odour.

All four stable halogens experience intermolecular van der Waals forces of attraction, and their strength increases together with the number of electrons among all homonuclear diatomic halogen molecules. Thus, the melting and boiling points of bromine are intermediate between those of chlorine and iodine. As a result of the increasing molecular weight of the halogens down the group, the density and heats of fusion and vaporisation of bromine are again intermediate between those of chlorine and iodine, although all their heats of vaporisation are fairly low (leading to high volatility) thanks to their diatomic molecular structure. The halogens darken in colour as the group is descended: fluorine is a very pale yellow gas, chlorine is greenish-yellow, and bromine is a reddish-brown volatile liquid that freezes at −7.2 °C and boils at 58.8 °C. (Iodine is a shiny black solid.) This trend occurs because the wavelengths of visible light absorbed by the halogens increase down the group. Specifically, the colour of a halogen, such as bromine, results from the electron transition between the highest occupied antibonding π_{g} molecular orbital and the lowest vacant antibonding σ_{u} molecular orbital. The colour fades at low temperatures so that solid bromine at −195 °C is pale yellow.

Liquid bromine is infrared-transparent.

Like solid chlorine and iodine, solid bromine crystallises in the orthorhombic crystal system, in a layered arrangement of Br_{2} molecules. The Br–Br distance is 227 pm (close to the gaseous Br–Br distance of 228 pm) and the Br···Br distance between molecules is 331 pm within a layer and 399 pm between layers (compare the van der Waals radius of bromine, 195 pm). This structure means that bromine is a very poor conductor of electricity, with a conductivity of around 5 × 10^{−13} Ω^{−1} cm^{−1} just below the melting point, although this is higher than the essentially undetectable conductivity of chlorine.

At a pressure of 55 GPa (roughly 540,000 times atmospheric pressure) bromine undergoes an insulator-to-metal transition. At 75 GPa it changes to a face-centered orthorhombic structure. At 100 GPa it changes to a body centered orthorhombic monatomic form.

=== Isotopes ===
Bromine has two stable isotopes, ^{79}Br and ^{81}Br. These are its only two natural isotopes, with ^{79}Br making up 51% of natural bromine and ^{81}Br making up the remaining 49%. Both have nuclear spin 3/2− and thus may be used for nuclear magnetic resonance, although ^{81}Br is more favourable. The relatively 1:1 distribution of the two isotopes in nature is helpful in identification of bromine containing compounds using mass spectroscopy. Other bromine isotopes are all radioactive, with half-lives too short to occur in nature. Of these, the most important are ^{80}Br (t_{1/2} = 17.7 min), ^{80m}Br (t_{1/2} = 4.421 h), and ^{82}Br (t_{1/2} = 35.28 h), which may be produced from the neutron activation of natural bromine. The most stable bromine radioisotope is ^{77}Br (t_{1/2} = 57.04 h). The primary decay mode of isotopes lighter than ^{79}Br is electron capture to isotopes of selenium; that of isotopes heavier than ^{81}Br is beta decay to isotopes of krypton; and ^{80}Br may decay by either mode to stable ^{80}Se or ^{80}Kr. Br isotopes from ^{87}Br and heavier undergo beta decay with neutron emission and are of practical importance because they are fission products.

== Chemistry and compounds ==
Halogen bond energies (kJ/mol)
| X | XX | HX | BX_{3} | AlX_{3} | CX_{4} |
|---|---|---|---|---|---|
| F | 159 | 574 | 645 | 582 | 456 |
| Cl | 243 | 428 | 444 | 427 | 327 |
| Br | 193 | 363 | 368 | 360 | 272 |
| I | 151 | 294 | 272 | 285 | 239 |

Bromine is intermediate in reactivity between chlorine and iodine, and is one of the most reactive elements. Bond energies to bromine tend to be lower than those to chlorine but higher than those to iodine, and bromine is a weaker oxidising agent than chlorine but a stronger one than iodine. This can be seen from the standard electrode potentials of the X_{2}/X^{−} couples (F, +2.866 V; Cl, +1.395 V; Br, +1.087 V; I, +0.615 V; At, approximately +0.3 V). Bromination often leads to higher oxidation states than iodination but lower or equal oxidation states to chlorination. Bromine tends to react with compounds including M–M, M–H, or M–C bonds to form M–Br bonds.

=== Hydrogen bromide ===
The simplest compound of bromine is hydrogen bromide, HBr. It is mainly used in the production of inorganic bromides and alkyl bromides, and as a catalyst for many reactions in organic chemistry. Industrially, it is mainly produced by the reaction of hydrogen gas with bromine gas at 200–400 °C with a platinum catalyst. However, reduction of bromine with red phosphorus is a more practical way to produce hydrogen bromide in the laboratory:

2 P + 6 H_{2}O + 3 Br_{2} → 6 HBr + 2 H_{3}PO_{3}
H_{3}PO_{3} + H_{2}O + Br_{2} → 2 HBr + H_{3}PO_{4}

At room temperature, hydrogen bromide is a colourless gas, like all the hydrogen halides apart from hydrogen fluoride, since hydrogen cannot form strong hydrogen bonds to the large and only mildly electronegative bromine atom; however, weak hydrogen bonding is present in solid crystalline hydrogen bromide at low temperatures, similar to the hydrogen fluoride structure, before disorder begins to prevail as the temperature is raised. Aqueous hydrogen bromide is known as hydrobromic acid, which is a strong acid (pK_{a} = −9) because the hydrogen bonds to bromine are too weak to inhibit dissociation. The HBr/H_{2}O system also involves many hydrates HBr·nH_{2}O for n = 1, 2, 3, 4, and 6, which are essentially salts of bromine anions and hydronium cations. Hydrobromic acid forms an azeotrope with boiling point 124.3 °C at 47.63 g HBr per 100 g solution; thus hydrobromic acid cannot be concentrated beyond this point by distillation.

Unlike hydrogen fluoride, anhydrous liquid hydrogen bromide is difficult to work with as a solvent, because its boiling point is low, it has a small liquid range, its dielectric constant is low and it does not dissociate appreciably into H_{2}Br^{+} and HBr_{2}^{−} ions – the latter, in any case, are much less stable than the bifluoride ions (HF_{2}^{−}) due to the very weak hydrogen bonding between hydrogen and bromine, though its salts with very large and weakly polarising cations such as Cs^{+} and NR_{4}^{+} (R = Me, Et, Bu_{n}) may still be isolated. Anhydrous hydrogen bromide is a poor solvent, only able to dissolve small molecular compounds such as nitrosyl chloride and phenol, or salts with very low lattice energies such as tetraalkylammonium halides.

=== Other binary bromides ===
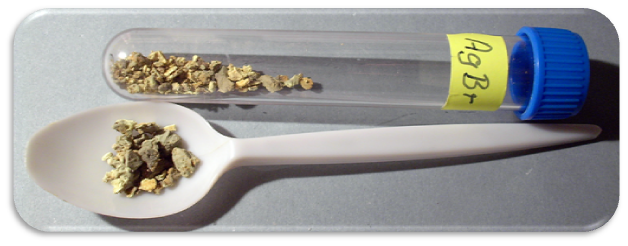
Silver bromide (AgBr)

Nearly all elements in the periodic table form binary bromides. The exceptions are decidedly in the minority and stem in each case from one of three causes: extreme inertness and reluctance to participate in chemical reactions (the noble gases, with the exception of xenon in the very unstable XeBr_{2}); extreme nuclear instability hampering chemical investigation before decay and transmutation (many of the heaviest elements beyond bismuth); and having an electronegativity higher than bromine's (oxygen, nitrogen, fluorine, and chlorine), so that the resultant binary compounds are formally not bromides but rather oxides, nitrides, fluorides, or chlorides of bromine. (Nonetheless, nitrogen tribromide is named as a bromide as it is analogous to the other nitrogen trihalides.)

Bromination of metals with Br_{2} tends to yield lower oxidation states than chlorination with Cl_{2} when a variety of oxidation states is available. Bromides can be made by reaction of an element or its oxide, hydroxide, or carbonate with hydrobromic acid, and then dehydrated by mildly high temperatures combined with either low pressure or anhydrous hydrogen bromide gas. These methods work best when the bromide product is stable to hydrolysis; otherwise, the possibilities include high-temperature oxidative bromination of the element with bromine or hydrogen bromide, high-temperature bromination of a metal oxide or other halide by bromine, a volatile metal bromide, carbon tetrabromide, or an organic bromide. For example, niobium(V) oxide reacts with carbon tetrabromide at 370 °C to form niobium(V) bromide. Another method is halogen exchange in the presence of excess "halogenating reagent", for example:

FeCl_{3} + BBr_{3} (excess) → FeBr_{3} + BCl_{3}

When a lower bromide is wanted, either a higher halide may be reduced using hydrogen or a metal as a reducing agent, or thermal decomposition or disproportionation may be used, as follows:

3 WBr_{5} + Al 3 WBr_{4} + AlBr_{3}
2 EuBr_{3} + H_{2} → 2 EuBr_{2} + 2 HBr
2 TaBr_{4} TaBr_{3} + TaBr_{5}

Most metal bromides with the metal in low oxidation states (+1 to +3) are ionic. Nonmetals tend to form covalent molecular bromides, as do metals in high oxidation states from +3 and above. Both ionic and covalent bromides are known for metals in oxidation state +3 (e.g. scandium bromide is mostly ionic, but aluminium bromide is not). Silver bromide is very insoluble in water and is thus often used as a qualitative test for bromine.

=== Bromine halides ===
The halogens form many binary, diamagnetic interhalogen compounds with stoichiometries XY, XY_{3}, XY_{5}, and XY_{7} (where X is heavier than Y), and bromine is no exception. Bromine forms a monofluoride and monochloride, as well as a trifluoride and pentafluoride. Some cationic and anionic derivatives are also characterised, such as BrF_{2}^{−}, BrCl_{2}^{−}, BrF_{2}^{+}, BrF_{4}^{+}, and BrF_{6}^{+}. Apart from these, some pseudohalides are also known, such as cyanogen bromide (BrCN), bromine thiocyanate (BrSCN), and bromine azide (BrN_{3}).

The pale-brown bromine monofluoride (BrF) is unstable at room temperature, disproportionating quickly and irreversibly into bromine, bromine trifluoride, and bromine pentafluoride. It thus cannot be obtained pure. It may be synthesised by the direct reaction of the elements, or by the comproportionation of bromine and bromine trifluoride at high temperatures. Bromine monochloride (BrCl), a red-brown gas, quite readily dissociates reversibly into bromine and chlorine at room temperature and thus also cannot be obtained pure, though it can be made by the reversible direct reaction of its elements in the gas phase or in carbon tetrachloride. Bromine monofluoride in ethanol readily leads to the monobromination of the aromatic compounds PhX (para-bromination occurs for X = Me, Bu^{t}, OMe, Br; meta-bromination occurs for the deactivating X = -CO_{2}Et, –CHO, -NO_{2}); this is due to heterolytic fission of the Br–F bond, leading to rapid electrophilic bromination by Br^{+}.

At room temperature, bromine trifluoride (BrF_{3}) is a straw-coloured liquid. It may be formed by directly fluorinating bromine at room temperature and is purified through distillation. It reacts violently with water and explodes on contact with flammable materials, but is a less powerful fluorinating reagent than chlorine trifluoride. It reacts vigorously with boron, carbon, silicon, arsenic, antimony, iodine, and sulfur to give fluorides, and will also convert most metals and many metal compounds to fluorides; as such, it is used to oxidise uranium to uranium hexafluoride in the nuclear power industry. Refractory oxides tend to be only partially fluorinated, but here the derivatives KBrF_{4} and BrF_{2}SbF_{6} remain reactive. Bromine trifluoride is a useful nonaqueous ionising solvent, since it readily dissociates to form BrF_{2}^{+} and BrF_{4}^{−} and thus conducts electricity.

Bromine pentafluoride (BrF_{5}) was first synthesised in 1930. It is produced on a large scale by direct reaction of bromine with excess fluorine at temperatures higher than 150 °C, and on a small scale by the fluorination of potassium bromide at 25 °C. It also reacts violently with water and is a very strong fluorinating agent, although chlorine trifluoride is still stronger.

=== Polybromine compounds ===
Although dibromine is a strong oxidising agent with a high first ionisation energy, very strong oxidisers such as peroxydisulfuryl fluoride (S_{2}O_{6}F_{2}) can oxidise it to form the cherry-red Br_{2}^{+} cation. A few other bromine cations are known, namely the brown Br_{3}^{+} and dark brown Br_{5}^{+}. The tribromide anion, Br_{3}^{−}, has also been characterised; it is analogous to triiodide.

=== Bromine oxides and oxoacids ===
Standard reduction potentials for aqueous Br species
| E°(couple) | a(H^{+}) = 1 (acid) | E°(couple) | a(OH^{−}) = 1 (base) |
|---|---|---|---|
| Br_{2}/Br^{−} | +1.052 | Br_{2}Br^{−} | +1.065 |
| HOBr/Br^{−} | +1.341 | BrO^{−}/Br^{−} | +0.760 |
| BrO_{3}^{−}/Br^{−} | +1.399 | BrO_{3}^{−}/Br^{−} | +0.584 |
| HOBr/Br_{2} | +1.604 | BrO^{−}/Br_{2} | +0.455 |
| BrO_{3}^{−}/Br_{2} | +1.478 | BrO_{3}^{−}/Br_{2} | +0.485 |
| BrO_{3}^{−}/HOBr | +1.447 | BrO_{3}^{−}/BrO^{−} | +0.492 |
| BrO_{4}^{−}/BrO_{3}^{−} | +1.853 | BrO_{4}^{−}/BrO_{3}^{−} | +1.025 |

Bromine oxides are not as well-characterised as chlorine oxides or iodine oxides, as they are all fairly unstable: it was once thought that they could not exist at all. Dibromine monoxide is a dark-brown solid which, while reasonably stable at −60 °C, decomposes at its melting point of −17.5 °C; it is useful in bromination reactions and may be made from the low-temperature decomposition of bromine dioxide in a vacuum. It oxidises iodine to iodine pentoxide and benzene to 1,4-benzoquinone; in alkaline solutions, it gives the hypobromite anion.

So-called "bromine dioxide", a pale yellow crystalline solid, may be better formulated as bromine perbromate, BrOBrO_{3}. It is thermally unstable above −40 °C, violently decomposing to its elements at 0 °C. Dibromine trioxide, syn-BrOBrO_{2}, is also known; it is the anhydride of hypobromous acid and bromic acid. It is an orange crystalline solid which decomposes above −40 °C; if heated too rapidly, it explodes around 0 °C. A few other unstable radical oxides are also known, as are some poorly characterised oxides, such as dibromine pentoxide, tribromine octoxide, and bromine trioxide.

The four oxoacids, hypobromous acid (HOBr), bromous acid (HOBrO), bromic acid (HOBrO_{2}), and perbromic acid (HOBrO_{3}), are better studied due to their greater stability, though they are only so in aqueous solution. When bromine dissolves in aqueous solution, the following reactions occur:

Br_{2} + H_{2}O ⇌ HOBr + H^{+} + Br^{−} (K_{ac} = 7.2 × 10^{−9} mol^{2} dm^{−6})
Br_{2} + 2 OH^{−} ⇌ OBr^{−} + H_{2}O + Br^{−} (K_{alk} = 2 × 10^{8})

Hypobromous acid is unstable to disproportionation. The hypobromite ions thus formed disproportionate readily to give bromide and bromate:

3 BrO^{−} ⇌ 2 Br^{−} + BrO_{3}^{−} (K = 10^{15})

Bromous acids and bromites are very unstable, although the strontium and barium bromites are known. More important are the bromates, which are prepared on a small scale by oxidation of bromide by aqueous hypochlorite, and are strong oxidising agents. Unlike chlorates, which very slowly disproportionate to chloride and perchlorate, the bromate anion is stable to disproportionation in both acidic and aqueous solutions. Bromic acid is a strong acid. Bromides and bromates may comproportionate to bromine as follows:

BrO_{3}^{−} + 5 Br^{−} + 6 H^{+} → 3 Br_{2} + 3 H_{2}O

There were many failed attempts to obtain perbromates and perbromic acid, leading to some rationalisations as to why they should not exist, until 1968 when the anion was first synthesised from the radioactive beta decay of unstable ^{83}SeO_{4}^{2−}. Today, perbromates are produced by the oxidation of alkaline bromate solutions by fluorine gas. Excess bromate and fluoride are precipitated as silver bromate and calcium fluoride, and the perbromic acid solution may be purified. The perbromate ion is fairly inert at room temperature but is thermodynamically extremely oxidising, with extremely strong oxidising agents needed to produce it, such as fluorine or xenon difluoride. The Br–O bond in BrO_{4}^{−} is fairly weak, which corresponds to the general reluctance of the 4p elements arsenic, selenium, and bromine to attain their group oxidation state, as they come after the scandide contraction characterised by the poor shielding afforded by the radial-nodeless 3d orbitals.

=== Organobromine compounds ===
Structure of N-bromosuccinimide, a common brominating reagent in organic chemistry

Like the other carbon–halogen bonds, the C–Br bond is a common functional group that forms part of core organic chemistry. Formally, compounds with this functional group may be considered organic derivatives of the bromide anion. Due to the difference of electronegativity between bromine (2.96) and carbon (2.55), the carbon atom in a C–Br bond is electron-deficient and thus electrophilic. The reactivity of organobromine compounds resembles but is intermediate between the reactivity of organochlorine and organoiodine compounds. For many applications, organobromides represent a compromise of reactivity and cost.

Organobromides are typically produced by additive or substitutive bromination of other organic precursors. Bromine itself can be used, but due to its toxicity and volatility, safer brominating reagents are normally used, such as N-bromosuccinimide. The principal reactions for organobromides include dehydrobromination, Grignard reactions, reductive coupling, and nucleophilic substitution.

Organobromides are the most common organohalides in nature, even though the concentration of bromide is only 0.3% of that for chloride in sea water, because of the easy oxidation of bromide to the equivalent of Br^{+}, a potent electrophile. The enzyme bromoperoxidase catalyses this reaction. The oceans are estimated to release 1–2 million tons of bromoform and 56,000 tons of bromomethane annually.

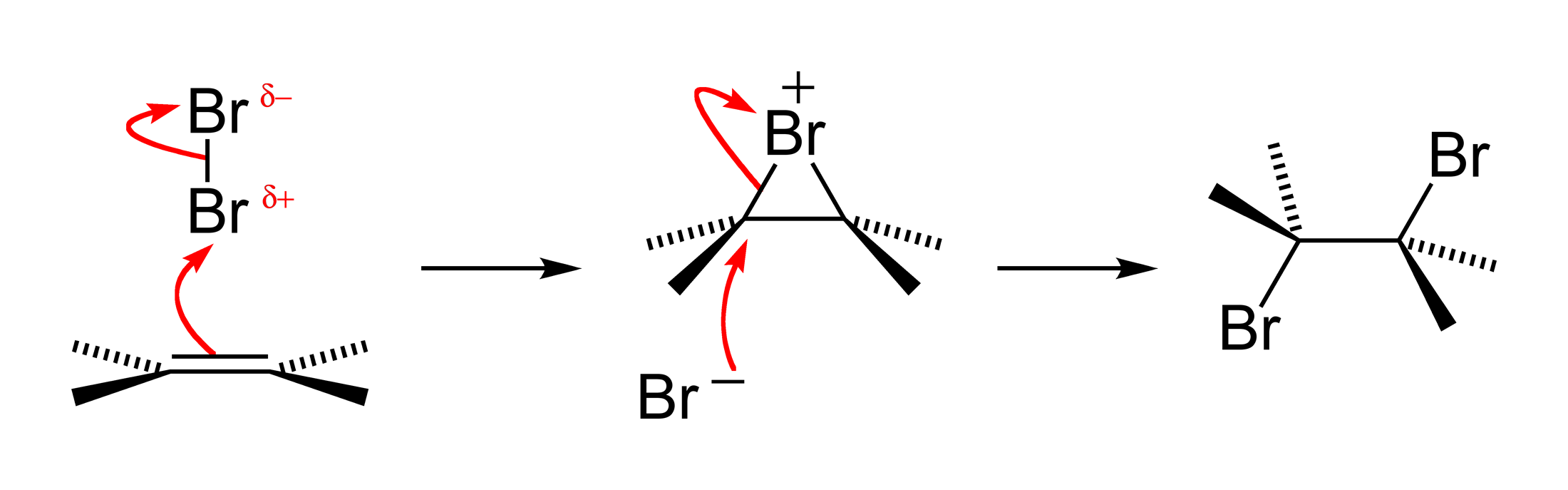
Bromine addition to alkene reaction mechanism

An old qualitative test for the presence of the alkene functional group is that alkenes turn brown aqueous bromine solutions colourless, forming a bromohydrin with some of the dibromoalkane also produced. The reaction passes through a short-lived strongly electrophilic bromonium intermediate. This is an example of a halogen addition reaction.

== Occurrence and production ==
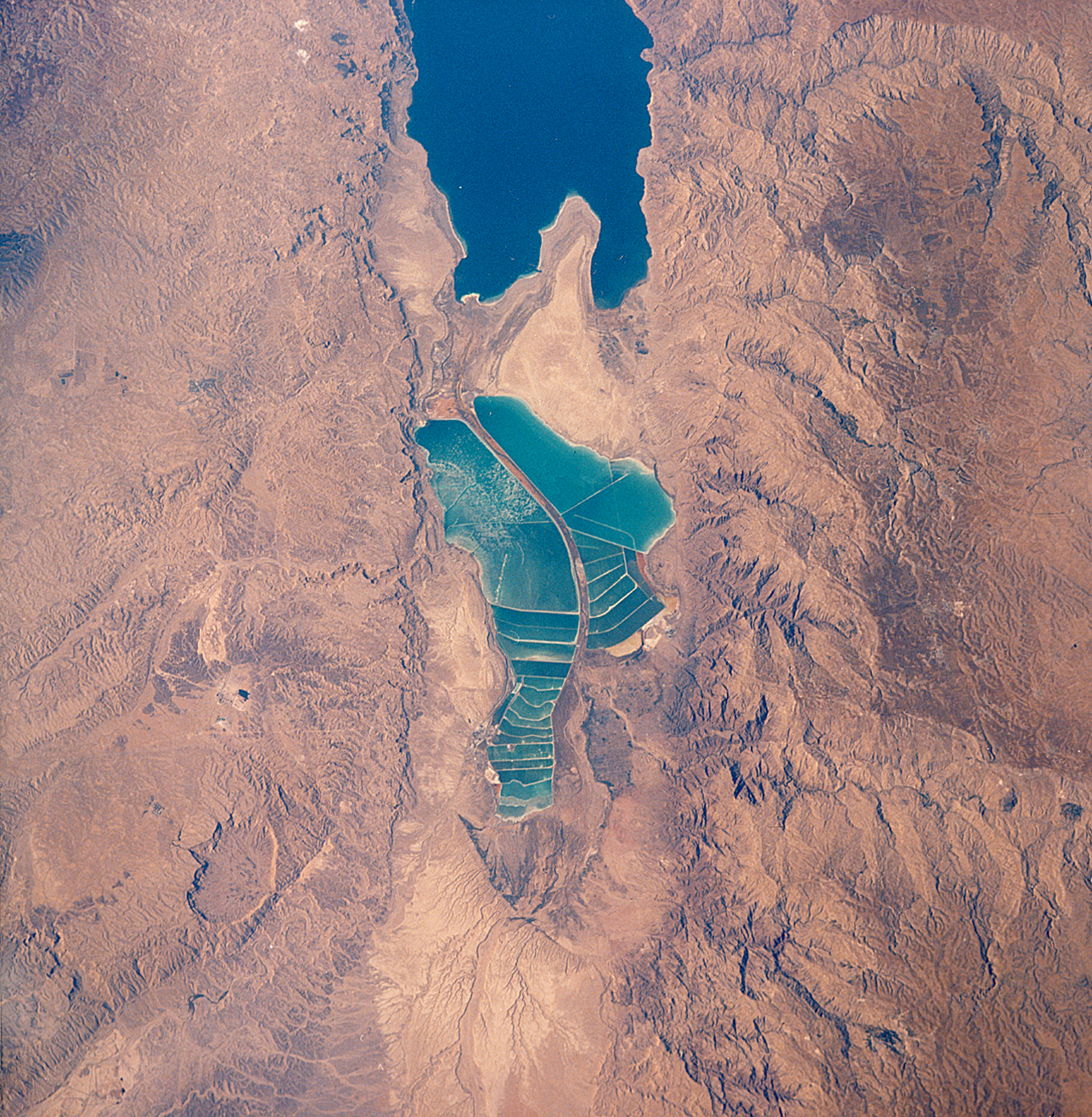
View of salt evaporation pans on the Dead Sea, where Jordan (right) and Israel (left) produce salt and bromine

Bromine is significantly less abundant in the crust than fluorine or chlorine, comprising only 2.5 parts per million of the Earth's crustal rocks, and then only as bromide salts. It is significantly more abundant in the oceans, resulting from long-term leaching. There, it makes up 65 parts per million, corresponding to a ratio of about one bromine atom for every 660 chlorine atoms. Salt lakes and brine wells may have higher bromine concentrations: for example, the Dead Sea contains 0.4% bromide ions. It is from these sources that bromine extraction is mostly economically feasible. Bromine is the tenth most abundant element in seawater.

The main sources of bromine production are Israel and Jordan. The element is liberated by halogen exchange, using chlorine gas to oxidise Br^{−} to Br_{2}. This is then removed with a blast of steam or air, and is then condensed and purified. Today, bromine is transported in large-capacity metal drums or lead-lined tanks that can hold hundreds of kilograms or even tonnes of bromine. The bromine industry is about one-hundredth the size of the chlorine industry. Laboratory production is unnecessary because bromine is commercially available and has a long shelf life.

== Applications ==
A wide variety of organobromine compounds are used in industry. Some are prepared from bromine and others are prepared from hydrogen bromide, which is obtained by burning hydrogen in bromine.

=== Flame retardants ===
Tetrabromobisphenol A

Brominated flame retardants represent a commodity of growing importance, and make up the largest commercial use of bromine. When the brominated material burns, the flame retardant produces hydrobromic acid which interferes in the radical chain reaction of the oxidation reaction of the fire. The mechanism is that the highly reactive hydrogen radicals, oxygen radicals, and hydroxyl radicals react with hydrobromic acid to form less reactive bromine radicals (i.e., free bromine atoms). Bromine atoms may also react directly with other radicals to help terminate the free radical chain-reactions that characterise combustion.

To make brominated polymers and plastics, bromine-containing compounds can be incorporated into the polymer during polymerisation. One method is to include a relatively small amount of brominated monomer during the polymerisation process. For example, vinyl bromide can be used in the production of polyethylene, polyvinyl chloride or polypropylene. Specific highly brominated molecules can also be added that participate in the polymerisation process. For example, tetrabromobisphenol A can be added to polyesters or epoxy resins, where it becomes part of the polymer. Epoxies used in printed circuit boards are normally made from such flame retardant resins, indicated by the FR in the abbreviation of the products (FR-4 and FR-2). In some cases, the bromine-containing compound may be added after polymerisation. For example, decabromodiphenyl ether can be added to the final polymers.

A number of gaseous or highly volatile brominated halomethane compounds are non-toxic and make superior fire suppressant agents by this same mechanism, and are particularly effective in enclosed spaces such as submarines, airplanes, and spacecraft. However, they are expensive and their production and use has been greatly curtailed due to their effect as ozone-depleting agents. They are no longer used in routine fire extinguishers, but retain niche uses in aerospace and military automatic fire suppression applications. They include bromochloromethane (Halon 1011, CH_{2}BrCl), bromochlorodifluoromethane (Halon 1211, CBrClF_{2}), and bromotrifluoromethane (Halon 1301, CBrF_{3}).

=== Other uses ===
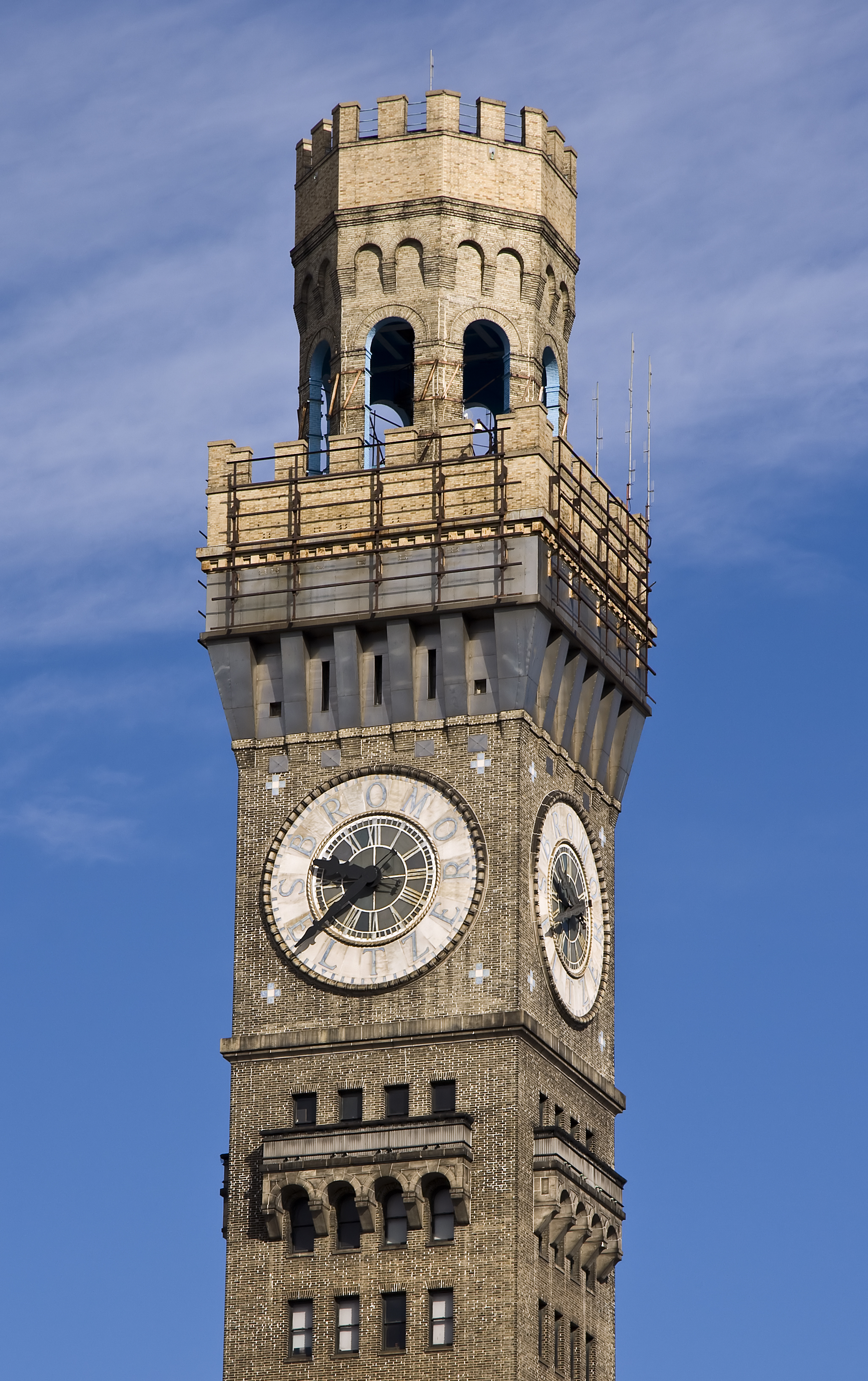
Baltimore's Emerson Bromo-Seltzer Tower, originally part of the headquarters of Emerson Drug Company, which made Bromo-Seltzer

Silver bromide is used, either alone or in combination with silver chloride and silver iodide, as the light sensitive constituent of photographic emulsions.

Ethylene bromide was an additive in gasolines containing lead anti-engine knocking agents. It scavenges lead by forming volatile lead bromide, which is exhausted from the engine. This application accounted for 77% of the bromine use in 1966 in the US. This application has declined since the 1970s due to environmental regulations (see below).

Vegetable oil modified by bromine known as Brominated vegetable oil (BVO), was used since the 1920s, to primarily help emulsify citrus-flavoured soft drinks, preventing them from separating during distribution. In 2024, the FDA banned the use of BVO in food.

Poisonous bromomethane was widely used as pesticide to fumigate soil and to fumigate housing, by the tenting method. Ethylene bromide was similarly used. These volatile organobromine compounds are all now regulated as ozone depletion agents. The Montreal Protocol on Substances that Deplete the Ozone Layer scheduled the phase out for the ozone depleting chemical by 2005, and organobromide pesticides are no longer used (in housing fumigation they have been replaced by such compounds as sulfuryl fluoride, which contain neither the chlorine or bromine organics which harm ozone). Before the Montreal protocol in 1991 (for example) an estimated 35,000 tonnes of the chemical were used to control nematodes, fungi, weeds and other soil-borne diseases.

In pharmacology, inorganic bromide compounds, especially potassium bromide, were frequently used as general sedatives in the 19th and early 20th century. Porsche in 1828 used KBr for scrofula. Otto Graf in a 1842 thesis reported that he became impotent while taking 1.8 g/day for two weeks as a self-experiment, and recovered sexual function upon ending the intake. Huette in 1850 reported that it caused impotence and loss of libido. Charles Locock in 1856 administered to women with "hysterical epilepsy", whose symptoms included masturbation. Locock theorized that masturbation caused epilepsy in these cases, and adiminstered KBr based on its anaphrodisiac effect. It caused a remission of epilepsy and masturbation. Locock did not understand KBr as an anticonvulsant in its own right. Subsequent research in the 1860s established KBr as generally effective for epilepsy, not just "hysterical" epilepsy, and it came into widespread use. In 1901, the Hospital for the Palsied and Epileptic in London was buying ~2 ton/year of KBr. Bromides also were recommended for insomnia, palpitations, and general neuroses, until barbituates supplanted them around 1930. It remained the only effective anticonvulsant, until the discovery of phenobarbital in 1912.

Bromides in the form of simple salts are still used as anticonvulsants in both veterinary and human medicine, although the latter use varies from country to country. For example, the U.S. Food and Drug Administration (FDA) does not approve bromide for the treatment of any disease, and sodium bromide was removed from over-the-counter (OTC) sedative products like Bromo-Seltzer, in 1975. FDA banned organic bromides from OTC sleep aids in 1989. Commercially available organobromine pharmaceuticals include the vasodilator nicergoline, the sedative brotizolam, the anticancer agent pipobroman, and the antiseptic merbromin. Otherwise, organobromine compounds are rarely pharmaceutically useful, in contrast to the situation for organofluorine compounds. Several drugs are produced as the bromide (or equivalents, hydrobromide) salts, but in such cases bromide serves as an innocuous counterion of no biological significance.

Organobromine compounds are used as psychedelic and designer drugs such as 2C-B, Bromo-DragonFLY, and 4-Bromomethcathinone.

Other uses of organobromine compounds include high-density drilling fluids, dyes (such as Tyrian purple and the indicator bromothymol blue), and pharmaceuticals. Bromine itself, as well as some of its compounds, are used in water treatment, and is the precursor of a variety of inorganic compounds with an enormous number of applications (e.g. silver bromide for photography). Zinc–bromine batteries are hybrid flow batteries used for stationary electrical power backup and storage; from household scale to industrial scale.

Bromine is used in cooling towers (in place of chlorine) for controlling bacteria, algae, fungi, and zebra mussels.

Because it has similar antiseptic qualities to chlorine, bromine can be used in the same manner as chlorine as a disinfectant or antimicrobial in applications such as swimming pools. Bromine came into this use in the United States during World War II due to a predicted shortage of chlorine. However, bromine is usually not used outside for these applications due to it being relatively more expensive than chlorine and the absence of a stabiliser to protect it from the sun. For indoor pools, it can be a good option as it is effective at a wider pH range. It is also more stable in a heated pool or hot tub.

== Biological role and toxicity ==
A 2014 study suggests that bromine (in the form of bromide ion) is a necessary cofactor in the biosynthesis of collagen IV, making the element essential to basement membrane architecture and tissue development in animals. Nevertheless, no clear deprivation symptoms or syndromes have been documented in mammals. In other biological functions, bromine may be non-essential but still beneficial when it takes the place of chlorine. For example, in the presence of hydrogen peroxide, H_{2}O_{2}, formed by the eosinophil, and either chloride, iodide, thiocyanate, or bromide ions, eosinophil peroxidase provides a potent mechanism by which eosinophils kill multicellular parasites (such as the nematode worms involved in filariasis) and some bacteria (such as tuberculosis bacteria). Eosinophil peroxidase is a haloperoxidase that preferentially uses bromide over chloride for this purpose, generating hypobromite (hypobromous acid), although the use of chloride is possible.

Octan-2-yl 4-bromo-3-oxobutanoate, an organobromine compound found in mammalian cerebrospinal fluid

α-Haloesters are generally thought of as highly reactive and consequently toxic intermediates in organic synthesis. Nevertheless, mammals, including humans, cats, and rats, appear to biosynthesise traces of an α-bromoester, 2-octyl 4-bromo-3-oxobutanoate, which is found in their cerebrospinal fluid and appears to play a yet unclarified role in inducing REM sleep. Neutrophil myeloperoxidase can use H_{2}O_{2} and Br^{−} to brominate deoxycytidine, which could result in DNA mutations. Marine organisms are the main source of organobromine compounds, and it is in these organisms that bromine is more firmly shown to be essential. More than 1600 such organobromine compounds were identified by 1999. The most abundant is methyl bromide (CH_{3}Br), of which an estimated 56,000 tonnes is produced by marine algae each year. The essential oil of the Hawaiian alga Asparagopsis taxiformis consists of 80% bromoform. Most of such organobromine compounds in the sea are made by the action of a unique algal enzyme, vanadium bromoperoxidase.

The bromide anion is not very toxic: a normal daily intake is 2 to 8 milligrams. However, high levels of bromide chronically impair the membrane of neurons, which progressively impairs neuronal transmission, leading to toxicity, known as bromism. Bromide has an elimination half-life of 9 to 12 days, which can lead to excessive accumulation. Doses of 0.5 to 1 gram per day of bromide can lead to bromism. Historically, the therapeutic dose of bromide is about 3 to 5 grams of bromide, thus explaining why chronic toxicity (bromism) was once so common. While significant and sometimes serious disturbances occur to neurologic, psychiatric, dermatological, and gastrointestinal functions, death from bromism is rare. Bromism is caused by a neurotoxic effect on the brain which results in somnolence, psychosis, seizures and delirium.

Bromine (Br_{2})
Hazards
- GHS labelling
| Pictograms | (GHS05: Corrosive) (GHS06: Toxic) (GHS09: Environmental hazard) |
| Signal word | Danger |
| Hazard statements | H314, H330, H400 |
| Precautionary statements | P260, P273, P280, P303+P361+P353, P304+P340+P310, P305+P351+P338 |
| NFPA 704 (fire diamond) | 3 0 0 |

Elemental bromine (Br_{2}) is toxic and causes chemical burns on human flesh. Inhaling bromine gas results in similar irritation of the respiratory tract, causing coughing, choking, shortness of breath, and death if inhaled in large enough amounts. Chronic exposure may lead to frequent bronchial infections and a general deterioration of health. As a strong oxidising agent, bromine is incompatible with most organic and inorganic compounds. Caution is required when transporting bromine; it is commonly carried in steel tanks lined with lead, supported by strong metal frames. The Occupational Safety and Health Administration (OSHA) of the United States has set a permissible exposure limit (PEL) for bromine at a time-weighted average (TWA) of 0.1 ppm. The National Institute for Occupational Safety and Health (NIOSH) has set a recommended exposure limit (REL) of TWA 0.1 ppm and a short-term limit of 0.3 ppm. The exposure to bromine immediately dangerous to life and health (IDLH) is 3 ppm. Bromine is classified as an extremely hazardous substance in the United States as defined in Section 302 of the U.S. Emergency Planning and Community Right-to-Know Act (42 U.S.C. 11002), and is subject to strict reporting requirements by facilities which produce, store, or use it in significant quantities.

== General and cited references ==
- Greenwood, Norman N.; Earnshaw, Alan (1997). Chemistry of the Elements (2nd ed.). Butterworth-Heinemann. doi:10.1016/C2009-0-30414-6. ISBN 978-0-08-037941-8.
