= Carl Jacob Löwig =

German chemist (1803–1890)

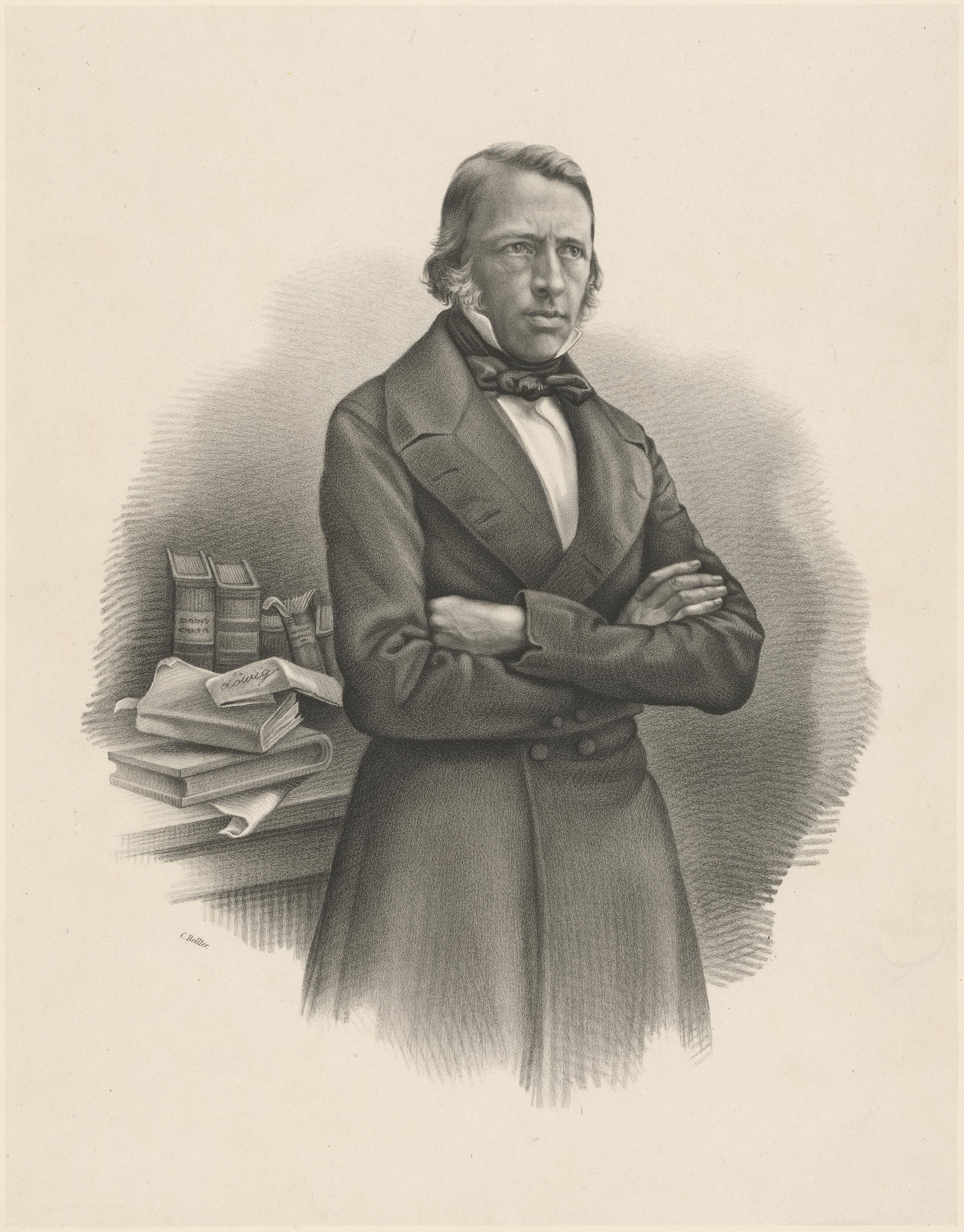
- Born: 17 March 1803; Bad Kreuznach, French First Republic (now in Rhineland-Palatinate, Germany)
- Died: 27 March 1890 (aged 87); Breslau, Province of Silesia, Kingdom of Prussia, German Empire (now Wrocław, Poland)
- Education: University of Heidelberg
- Known for: Discovery of bromine
- Scientific career
- Workplaces: University of Heidelberg, University of Zurich, University of Breslau
- Doctoral advisor: Leopold Gmelin

Carl Jacob Löwig (17 March 1803 – 27 March 1890) was a German chemist and discovered bromine independently of Antoine Jérôme Balard.

He received his PhD at the University of Heidelberg for his work with Leopold Gmelin. During his research on mineral salts he discovered bromine in 1825, as a brown gas evolving after the salt was treated with chlorine.

In 1853, he was the first person to synthesize tetraethyllead (Pb(C_{2}H_{5})_{4}).

After working at the University of Heidelberg and the University of Zurich he became the successor to Robert Wilhelm Bunsen at the University of Breslau. He worked and lived in Breslau until his death in 1890.
