= Perbromate =

Ion

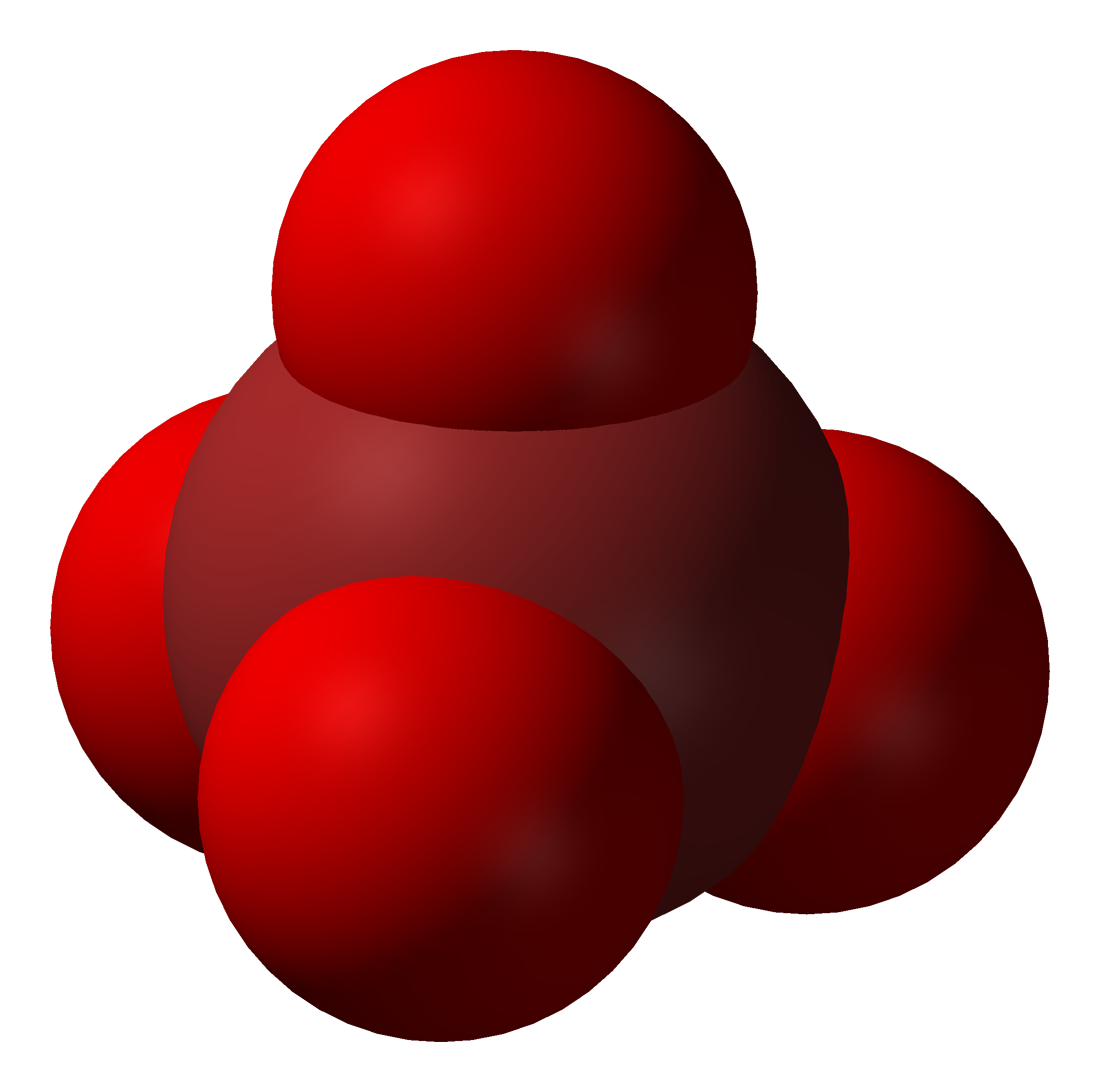
- Space-filling model of the perbromate anion, BrO_{4}^{−}

Identifiers
CAS Number	16474-32-1
3D model (JSmol)	Interactive image
ChEBI	CHEBI:29246
ChemSpider	4574125
PubChem CID	5460630
- InChI: InChI=1S/BrHO4/c2-1(3,4)5/h(H,2,3,4,5)/p-1 Key: LLYCMZGLHLKPPU-UHFFFAOYSA-M
- SMILES: [O-]Br(=O)(=O)=O

Properties
Chemical formula	BrO_{4}^{−}
Molar mass	143.901 g·mol^{−1}

Related compounds
Related compounds	bromide; hypobromite; bromite; bromate
- Except where otherwise noted, data are given for materials in their standard state (at 25 °C [77 °F], 100 kPa). Infobox references

In chemistry, the perbromate ion is the anion with the chemical formula BrO_{4}^{−}. It is an oxyanion of bromine, the conjugate base of perbromic acid, in which bromine has the oxidation state +7. Unlike its chlorine (ClO_{4}^{−}) and iodine (IO_{4}^{−}) analogs, it is difficult to synthesize. It has tetrahedral molecular geometry.

The term perbromate also refers to a compound that contains the BrO_{4}^{−} anion or the −OBrO_{3} functional group.

The perbromate ion is a strong oxidizing agent. The reduction potential for the BrO_{4}^{−}/Br^{−} couple is +0.68 V at pH 14. This is comparable to selenite's reduction potential.

== Synthesis ==
Attempted syntheses of perbromates were unsuccessful until 1968, when it was finally obtained by the beta decay of selenium-83 in a selenate salt by chemist Evan H. Appelman:

^{83}SeO_{4}^{2−} → ^{83}BrO_{4}^{−} + β^{−}

Subsequently, it was successfully synthesized again by the electrolysis of LiBrO_{3}, although only in low yield. Later, it was obtained by the oxidation of bromate with xenon difluoride (XeF_{2}). Once perbromates are obtained, perbromic acid can be produced by protonating BrO_{4}^{−}.

One effective method of producing perbromate is by the oxidation of bromate with fluorine under alkaline conditions:

BrO_{3}^{−} + F_{2} + 2 OH^{−} → BrO_{4}^{−} + 2 F^{−} + H_{2}O

This synthesis is much easier to perform on a large scale than the electrolysis route or oxidation by xenon difluoride.

In 2011 a new, more effective synthesis was discovered: perbromate ions were formed through the reaction of hypobromite and bromate ions in an alkaline sodium hypobromite solution. The reaction (and its perchlorate analogue) occurs naturally, but very slowly, requiring several days to complete.

== See also ==
Other bromine anions:

Bromine oxidation state	−1	+1	+3	+5	+7
Name	bromide	hypobromite	bromite	bromate	perbromate
Formula	Br^{−}	BrO^{−}	BrO_{2}^{−}	BrO_{3}^{−}	BrO_{4}^{−}
Structure	The bromide ion	The hypobromite ion	The bromite ion	The bromate ion	The perbromate ion
