= Dibromine trioxide =

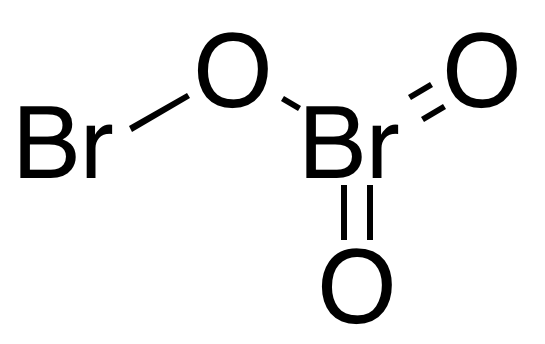

Names
- IUPAC name Dibromine trioxide
- Other names Bromine trioxide Bromine bromate

Identifiers
CAS Number	53809-75-9
3D model (JSmol)	Interactive image
ChemSpider	11564402
PubChem CID	15779614
- InChI: InChI=1S/Br2O3/c1-5-2(3)4 Key: XLGPPSYTBHJSNE-UHFFFAOYSA-N
- SMILES: BrO[Br](=O)=O

Properties
Chemical formula	Br_{2}O_{3}
Molar mass	207.806 g/mol
Appearance	orange needles
Melting point	decomposes around −40°C

Structure
Crystal structure	monoclinic
Space group	P2_{1}/c
Lattice constant	a = 1186.6 pm, b = 762.9 pm, c = 869.3 pm α = 90°, β = 106.4°, γ = 90°

Related compounds
Other anions	Bromine dioxide Bromine trifluoride Bromine pentafluoride
Other cations	Oxygen difluoride Dichlorine monoxide Chlorine dioxide Iodine dioxide
- Except where otherwise noted, data are given for materials in their standard state (at 25 °C [77 °F], 100 kPa). (what is ?) Infobox references

Dibromine trioxide is the chemical compound composed of bromine and oxygen with the formula Br_{2}O_{3}. It is an orange solid that is stable below −40 °C. It has the structure Br−O−BrO_{2} (bromine bromate). It was discovered in 1993. The bond angle of Br−O−Br is 111.7°, the bond angle of O−Br=O is 103.1°, and the bond angle of O=Br=O is 107.6°. The Br−OBrO_{2} bond length is 1.845 Å, the O−BrO_{2} bond length is 1.855 Å and the Br=O bond length is 1.612 Å.

== Reactions ==
Dibromine trioxide can be prepared by reacting a solution of bromine in dichloromethane with ozone at low temperatures. It disproportionates in alkali solutions to Br^{−} and BrO^{−}_{3}.
