= Perbromic acid =

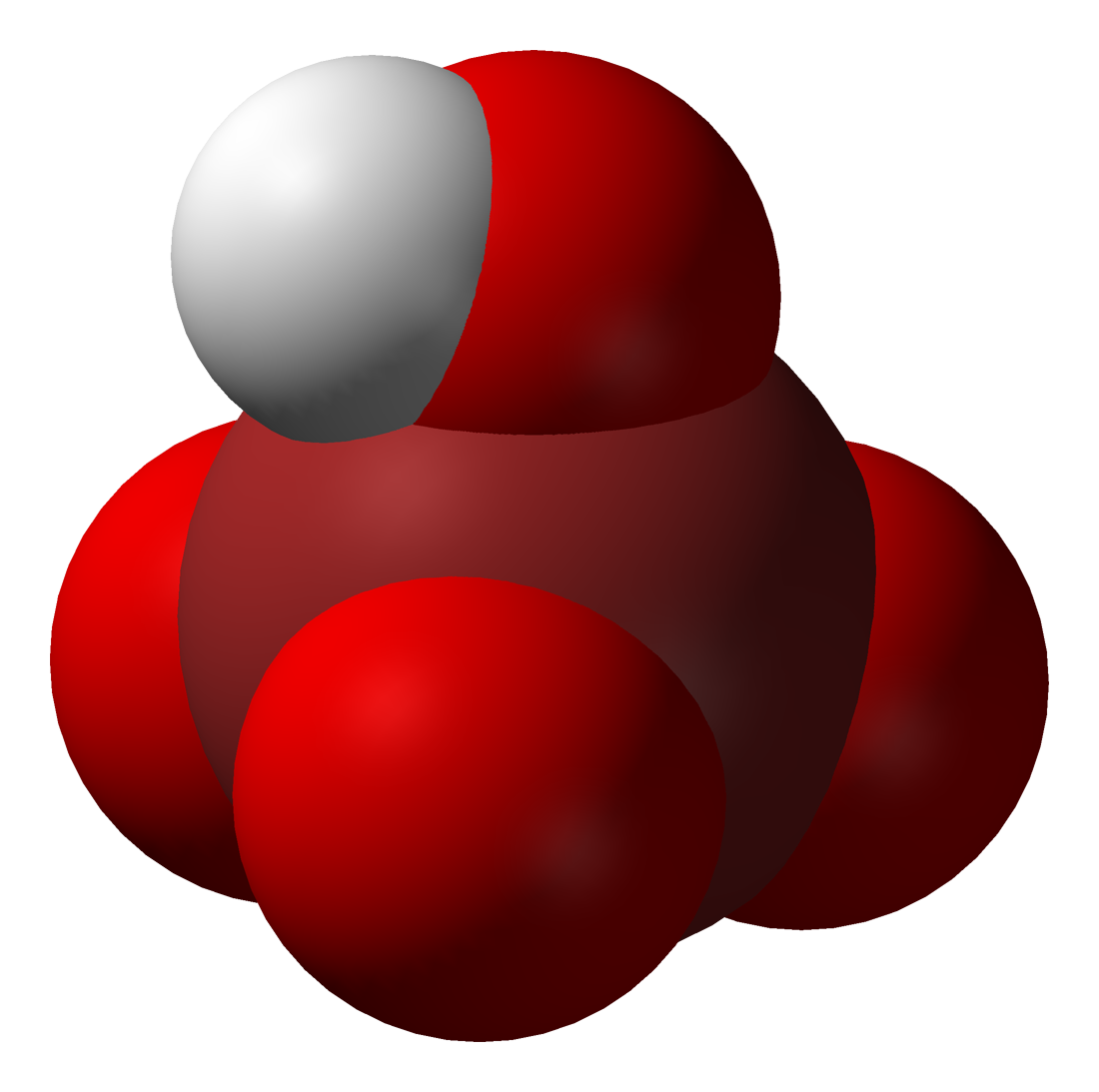

Identifiers
CAS Number	19445-25-1
3D model (JSmol)	Interactive image
ChEBI	CHEBI:29245
ChemSpider	167074
PubChem CID	192513
CompTox Dashboard (EPA)	DTXSID70276715
- InChI: InChI=1S/HBrO4/c2-1(3,4)5/h(H,2,3,4,5) Key: LLYCMZGLHLKPPU-UHFFFAOYSA-N; InChI=1/HBrO4/c2-1(3,4)5/h(H,2,3,4,5) Key: LLYCMZGLHLKPPU-UHFFFAOYAZ
- SMILES: O[Br+3]([O-])([O-])[O-]

Properties
Chemical formula	HBrO_{4}
Molar mass	144.908 g·mol^{−1}
Appearance	colorless liquid
Melting point	decomposes before melting, unstable as solid
Conjugate base	Perbromate

Hazards
- Occupational safety and health (OHS/OSH)
Main hazards	powerful oxidizer
- Except where otherwise noted, data are given for materials in their standard state (at 25 °C [77 °F], 100 kPa). verify (what is ?) Infobox references

Perbromic acid is the inorganic compound with the formula HBrO_{4}. Perbromic acid is characterized as a colorless liquid which has no characteristic scent. It is an oxoacid of bromine, with an oxidation state of +7. Perbromic acid is a strong acid and strongly oxidizing, though dilute perbromic acid solutions are slow oxidizing agents. It is the most unstable of the halogen(VII) oxoacids. It decomposes rapidly on standing to bromic acid and oxygen, which releases toxic brown bromine vapors. It can be used in the synthesis of perbromate salts, by reacting with a base.

Perbromic acid is unstable and cannot be formed by displacement of chlorine from perchloric acid, as periodic acid is prepared; it can only be made by protonation of the perbromate ion. Perbromic acid is stable in aqueous solutions no greater than 6M. Perbromic acid solutions greater than 6M are unstable in air, where an autocatalytic decomposition of the compound will occur. Metals such as Ce^{4+} and Ag^{+} can also catalyze its decomposition.

== Discovery ==
Perbromic acid was discovered through the decay of a radioactive selenate sample, SeO^{2−}_{4}, where bromine crystals were exposed to gamma radiation.

== Safety ==
Perbromic acid is corrosive and an irritant, therefore it is extremely dangerous to the skin, eyes, airways, and digestive tract. Overexposure can lead to various effects such as suffocation of the lungs, loss of consciousness, and death. Due to its toxicity, prolonged or repeated exposure could also lead to organ damage via the lungs, kidneys, and intestines.

== See also ==
- Perbromate

== Citations ==
1. Appelman, Evan H. (1969). "Perbromic acid and perbromates: synthesis and some properties". Inorganic Chemistry. 8 (2): 223–227. doi:10.1021/ic50072a008.
2. Perbromic acid (HBrO4): properties, risks and uses - science - 2023. warbletoncouncil. https://warbletoncouncil.org/acido-perbromico-12549#menu-3.

‌
