= Hypobromite =

Ion, and compounds containing the ion

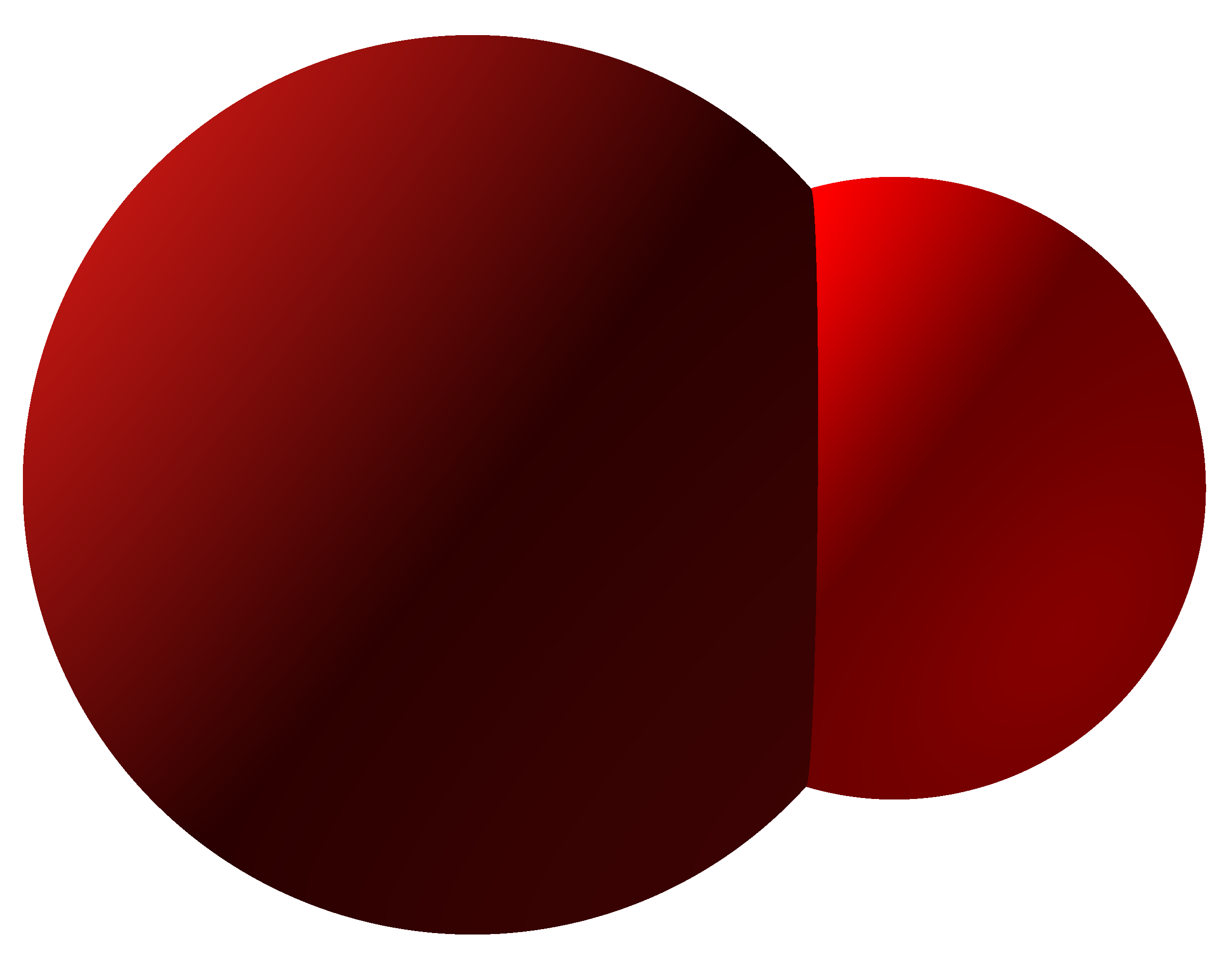

Names
- IUPAC name hypobromite

Identifiers
CAS Number	14380-62-2
3D model (JSmol)	Interactive image
ChEBI	CHEBI:29250
ChemSpider	4574121
Gmelin Reference	1040
PubChem CID	5460626
CompTox Dashboard (EPA)	DTXSID6021614
- InChI: InChI=1S/BrO/c1-2/q-1 Key: JGJLWPGRMCADHB-UHFFFAOYSA-N
- SMILES: [O-]Br

Properties
Chemical formula	BrO^{−}
Molar mass	95.903 g·mol^{−1}
Conjugate acid	Hypobromous acid
- Except where otherwise noted, data are given for materials in their standard state (at 25 °C [77 °F], 100 kPa). verify (what is ?) Infobox references

Hypobromite, also called alkaline bromine water, is an anion with the chemical formula BrO^{−}. Bromine is in the +1 oxidation state. The Br−O bond length is 1.82 Å. Hypobromite is the bromine compound analogous to hypochlorites found in common bleaches, and in immune cells. In many ways, hypobromite functions in the same manner as hypochlorite, and is also used as a germicide and antiparasitic in both industrial applications, and in the immune system.

== Preparation ==
Hypobromite salts form upon treating bromine with aqueous alkali, such as sodium or potassium hydroxide. At 20 °C (68 °F) the reaction is rapid.

Br_{2} + 2 OH^{−}(aq) → Br^{−} + BrO^{−} + H_{2}O

In this reaction the bromine disproportionates (some undergoes reduction and some oxidation) from oxidation state 0 (Br_{2}) to oxidation state −1 (Br^{−}) and oxidation state +1 (BrO^{−}). Sodium hypobromite can be isolated as an orange solid.

A secondary reaction, where hypobromite spontaneously disproportionates to bromide (bromine oxidation state −1) and bromate (bromine oxidation state +5) takes place rapidly at 20 °C (68 °F) and slowly at 0 °C (32 °F).

3 BrO^{−} → 2 Br^{−} + BrO^{−}_{3}

Hence, in reaction 2, the formation and proportions of the −1, +1 and +5 bromine oxidation state products can be controlled by temperature. Hypobromite is not thermodynamically stable at any pH (see Pourbaix diagram for bromine), but it is kinetically locked toward a further disproportion into bromate and bromide above the pKa of HBrO.

These reactions of bromine are analogous to those of chlorine forming hypochlorite and chlorate. The corresponding chlorine reaction 1 (to form ClO^{−}) is fast at 20 °C (68 °F) and reaction 2 (to form ClO^{−}_{3}) is slow at 20 °C (68 °F) and fast at 70 °C (158 °F).

== In nature and industry ==
Bromide from the diet, naturally present in the blood, is used by eosinophils, white blood cells of the granulocyte class, specialized for dealing with multi-cellular parasites. These cells react the bromide with peroxide to generate hypobromite by the action of eosinophil peroxidase, a haloperoxidase enzyme which preferentially uses bromide over chloride for this purpose.

Simple bromide salts (such as sodium bromide) are also sometimes used in hot tubs and spas as mild germicidal agents, using the action of an added oxidizing agent (such as hydrogen peroxide) to generate hypobromite in situ, in a similar fashion to the action of peroxidase on bromide in eosinophils.

Hypobromite has been proposed to be a reactive intermediate in the Hofmann rearrangement.

== See also ==
Other bromine anions:

Bromine oxidation state	−1	+1	+3	+5	+7
Name	bromide	hypobromite	bromite	bromate	perbromate
Formula	Br^{−}	BrO^{−}	BrO^{−}_{2}	BrO^{−}_{3}	BrO^{−}_{4}
Structure	The bromide ion	The hypobromite ion	The bromite ion	The bromate ion	The perbromate ion
