= Sodium bromite =

Names
- IUPAC name Sodium bromite

Identifiers
CAS Number	7486-26-2
3D model (JSmol)	Interactive image
ChemSpider	145143
ECHA InfoCard	100.028.446
EC Number	231-290-9
PubChem CID	165615; 23673655
UNII	H88G310G41
CompTox Dashboard (EPA)	DTXSID60884388
- InChI: InChI=1S/BrHO2.Na/c2-1-3;/h(H,2,3);/q;+1/p-1 Key: NYCVSSWORUBFET-UHFFFAOYSA-M
- SMILES: [O-]Br=O.[Na+]

Properties
Chemical formula	NaBrO_{2}
Molar mass	134.892 g·mol^{−1}
Appearance	Yellow solid
Density	2.22 g/cm^{3} (trihydrate)

Structure
Crystal structure	Triclinic
Space group	P1̅
Point group	C_{i}
Lattice constant	a = 5.42 Å, b = 6.44 Å, c = 9.00 Å α = 72.8°, β = 87.9°, γ = 70.7°
- Except where otherwise noted, data are given for materials in their standard state (at 25 °C [77 °F], 100 kPa). Infobox references

Sodium bromite is a sodium salt of bromous acid. Its trihydrate, NaBrO_{2}·3H_{2}O, has been isolated in crystal form. It is used by the textile refining industry as a desizing agent for oxidative starch removal.

It is also used as an oxidizing agent for converting alcohols to aldehydes, such as the conversion of benzyl alcohol to benzaldehyde, and for the Hofmann degradation of amides to amines.
