= Tribromine octoxide =

Names
- Other names bromine oxide, tribromooctaoxide

Identifiers
3D model (JSmol)	Interactive image
- InChI: InChI=1S/Br3O8/c4-1(5,2(6,7)8)3(9,10)11 Key: BLJXTHNZHMPNQW-UHFFFAOYSA-N
- SMILES: O=[Br](=O)(=O)[Br](=O)(=O)Br(=O)(=O)=O

Properties
Chemical formula	Br_{3}O_{8}
Molar mass	367.704 g·mol^{−1}
Appearance	white solid
Solubility in water	soluble
- Except where otherwise noted, data are given for materials in their standard state (at 25 °C [77 °F], 100 kPa). Infobox references

Tribromine octoxide is a binary inorganic compound of bromine and oxygen with the chemical formula Br_{3}O_{8}. This is a free radical and one of the most complex bromine oxides.

== Synthesis ==
A reaction of Br_{2} with O_{3} at 273 K and low pressure.

== Physical properties ==
The compound forms a white solid. It exists in two forms which are both soluble in water. It is unstable above −73 °C.
