= Silver bromate =

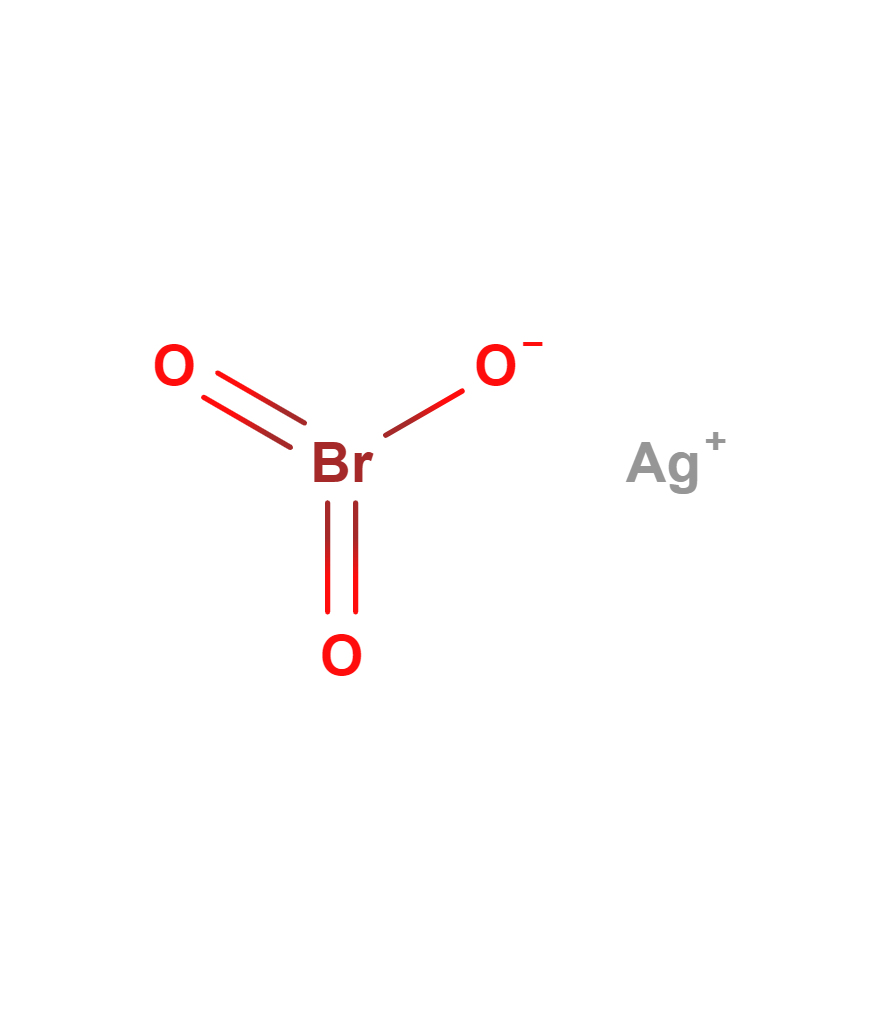

Names
- Systematic IUPAC name Silver(I) bromate
- Other names Argentous bromate

Identifiers
CAS Number	7783-89-3
3D model (JSmol)	Interactive image
ChemSpider	8053699
ECHA InfoCard	100.029.120
PubChem CID	9878022
CompTox Dashboard (EPA)	DTXSID60999042
- InChI: InChI=1S/Ag.BrHO3/c;2-1(3)4/h;(H,2,3,4)/q+1;/p-1 Key: XQLMNMQWVCXIKR-UHFFFAOYSA-M; InChI=1/Ag.BrHO3/c;2-1(3)4/h;(H,2,3,4)/q+1;/p-1 Key: XQLMNMQWVCXIKR-REWHXWOFAZ
- SMILES: [Ag+].[O-]Br(=O)=O

Properties
Chemical formula	AgBrO_{3}
Molar mass	235.770 g/mol
Appearance	white powder photosensitive
Density	5.206 g/cm^{3}
Melting point	309 °C (588 °F; 582 K)
Solubility in water	0.167 g/100 mL
Solubility product (K_{sp})	5.38×10^{−5}
Solubility in ammonium hydroxide	soluble

Hazards
- GHS labelling
Pictograms	(GHS03: Oxidizing) (GHS07: Exclamation mark)
Signal word	Danger
Hazard statements	H272, H315, H319, H335
Precautionary statements	P210, P220, P261, P264, P271, P280, P302+P352, P304+P340+P312, P305+P351+P338, P332+P313, P337+P313, P362+P364, P370+P378, P403+P233, P405, P501
Safety data sheet (SDS)	MSDS
- Except where otherwise noted, data are given for materials in their standard state (at 25 °C [77 °F], 100 kPa). verify (what is ?) Infobox references

Silver bromate GIF

Silver bromate is an inorganic compound with the chemical formula AgBrO_{3}. It is a white powder that is toxic and is both light and heat-sensitive.

== Preparation ==
Silver bromate can be precipitated by adding dilute potassium bromate solution to a solution of silver nitrate.

== Uses ==
Silver bromate can be used as an oxidant for the transformation of tetrahydropyranyl ethers to carbonyl compounds.
