= Bromate =

Ion, and compounds containing the ion

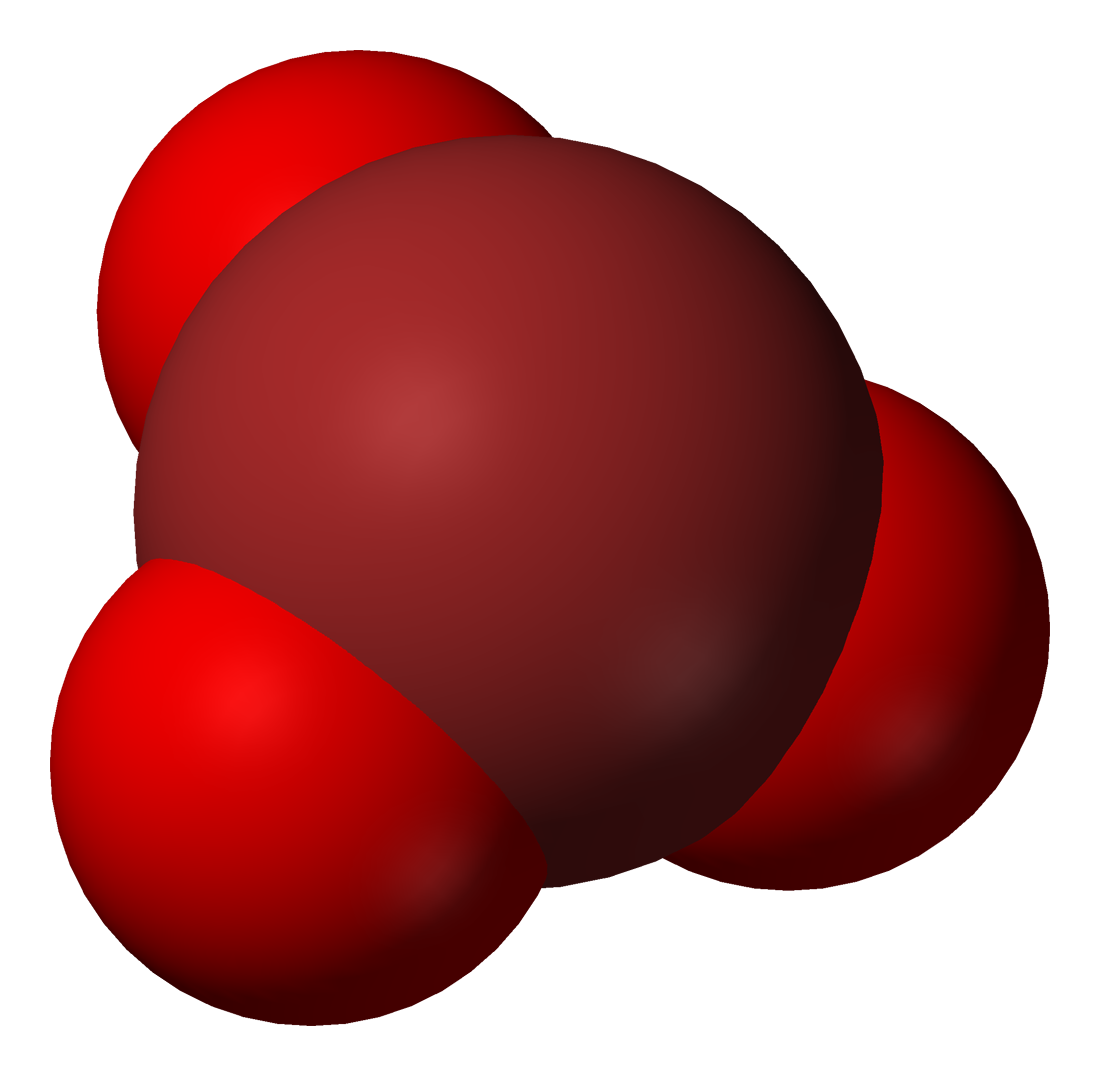

Identifiers
CAS Number	15541-45-4
3D model (JSmol)	Interactive image
ChEBI	CHEBI:29223
ChemSpider	76658
Gmelin Reference	1888
PubChem CID	84979
UN number	1450
CompTox Dashboard (EPA)	DTXSID8023923
- InChI: InChI=1S/BrHO3/c2-1(3)4/h(H,2,3,4)/p-1 Key: SXDBWCPKPHAZSM-UHFFFAOYSA-M
- SMILES: [O-][Br+2]([O-])[O-]

Properties
Chemical formula	BrO_{3}^{−}
Conjugate acid	Bromic acid
- Except where otherwise noted, data are given for materials in their standard state (at 25 °C [77 °F], 100 kPa). verify (what is ?) Infobox references

The bromate anion, BrO_{3}^{−}, is a bromine-based oxoanion. A bromate is a chemical compound that contains this ion. Examples of bromates include sodium bromate (NaBrO_{3}) and potassium bromate (KBrO_{3}).

Bromates are formed many different ways in municipal drinking water. The most common is the reaction of ozone and bromide:

Br^{−} + O_{3} → BrO_{3}^{−}

Electrochemical processes, such as electrolysis of brine without a membrane operating to form hypochlorite, will also produce bromate when bromide ion is present in the brine solution.

Photoactivation (sunlight exposure) will encourage liquid or gaseous bromine to generate bromate in bromide-containing water.

In laboratories bromates can be synthesized by dissolving Br_{2} in a concentrated solution of potassium hydroxide (KOH). The following reactions will take place (via the intermediate creation of hypobromite):

Br_{2} + 2 OH^{−} → Br^{−} + BrO^{−} + H_{2}O

3 BrO^{−} → BrO_{3}^{−} + 2 Br^{−}

== Human health issues ==
Bromate in drinking water is a suspected human carcinogen. Its presence in Coca-Cola's Dasani bottled water forced a recall of that product in the UK.

== Bromate formation during ozonation ==
Although few by-products are formed by ozonation, ozone reacts with bromide ions in water to produce bromate. Bromide can be found in sufficient concentrations in fresh water to produce (after ozonation) more than 10 ppb of bromate—the maximum contaminant level established by the USEPA. Proposals to reduce bromate formation include: lowering the water pH below 6.0, limiting the doses of ozone, using an alternate water source with a lower bromide concentration, pretreatment with ammonia, and addition of small concentrations of chloramines prior to ozonation.

== Reservoir pollution ==
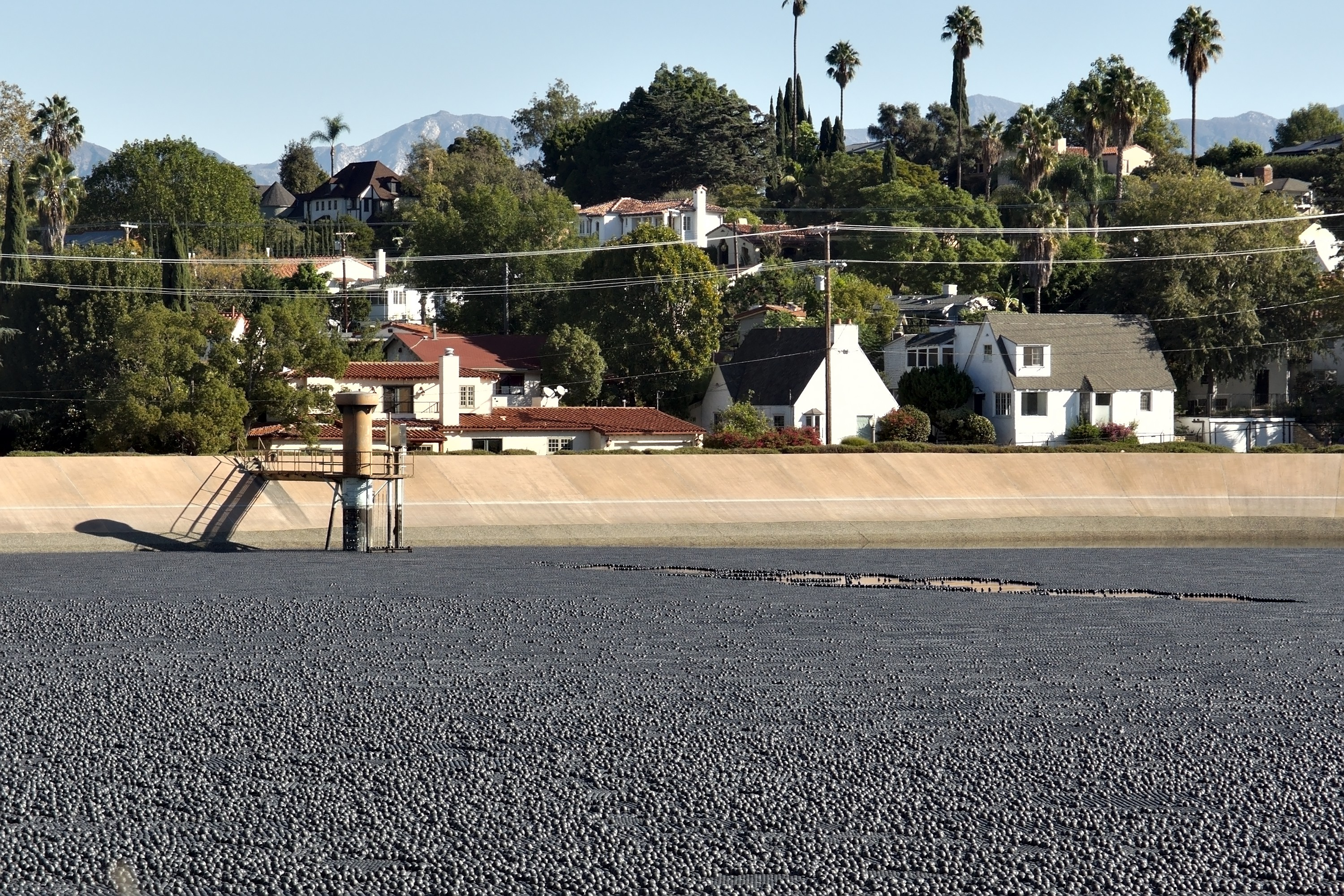
Ivanhoe Reservoir after addition of shade balls

On December 14, 2007, the Los Angeles Department of Water and Power (LADWP) announced that it would drain Silver Lake Reservoir and Elysian Reservoir due to bromate contamination. At the Silver Lake and Elysian reservoirs a combination of bromide from well water, chlorine, and sunlight had formed bromate. The decontamination took 4 months, discharging over 600 million US gallons (2.3×10^{6} m^{3}) of contaminated water.

On June 9, 2008 the LADWP began covering the surface of the 10-acre (4 ha), 58-million-US-gallon (0.22×10^{6} m^{3}) open Ivanhoe Reservoir with black, plastic shade balls to block the sunlight which causes the naturally present bromide to react with the chlorine used in treatment. 3 million of the 40 cent balls are required to cover the Ivanhoe and Elysian reservoirs.

== Natural occurrence ==
Currently no bromate-bearing minerals (i.e., the ones with bromate ion being an essential constituent) are known.

== See also ==
Other bromine anions:

Bromine oxidation state	−1	+1	+3	+5	+7
Name	bromide	hypobromite	bromite	bromate	perbromate
Formula	Br^{−}	BrO^{−}	BrO_{2}^{−}	BrO_{3}^{−}	BrO_{4}^{−}
Structure	The bromide ion	The hypobromite ion	The bromite ion	The bromate ion	The perbromate ion
