= Bromous acid =

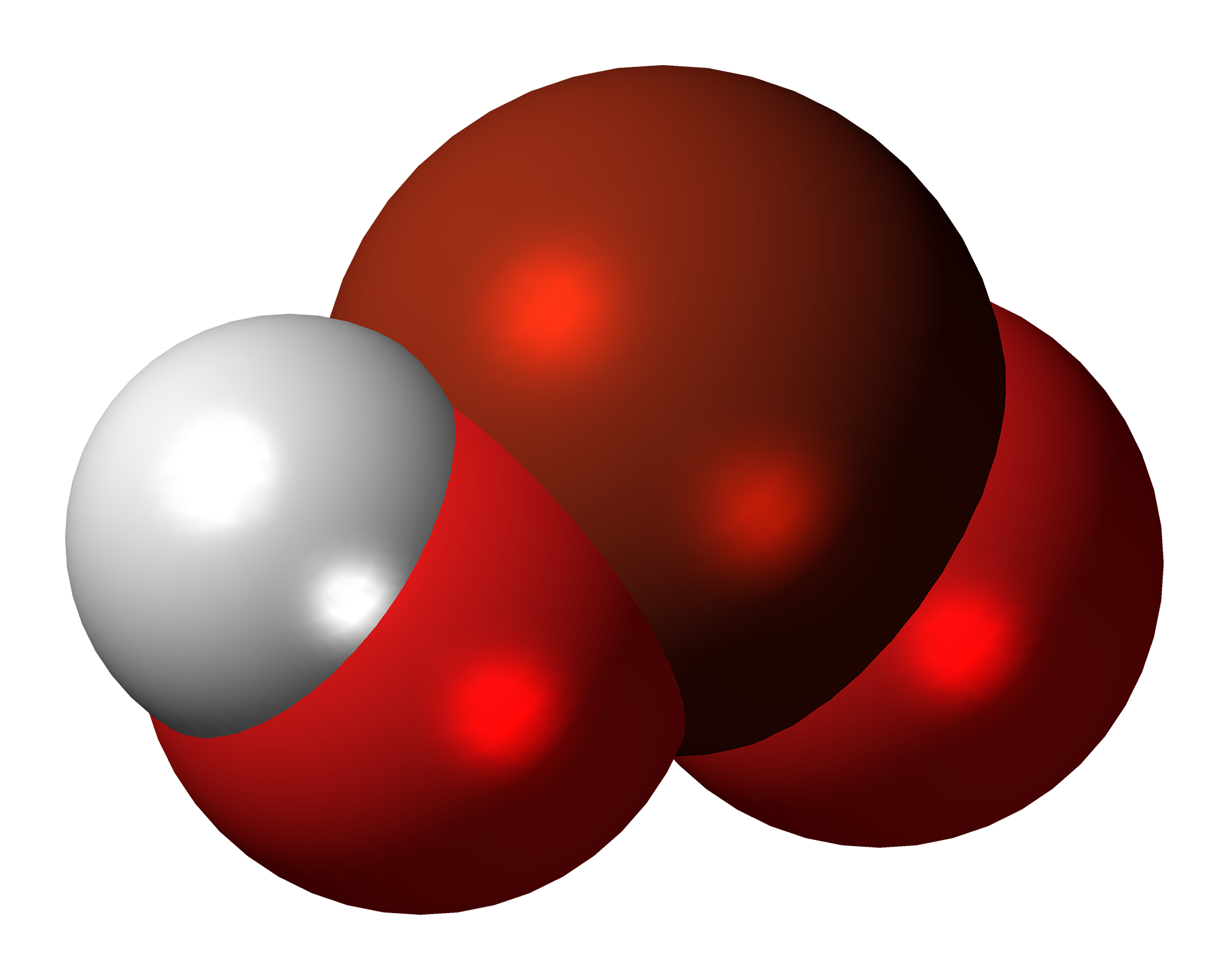

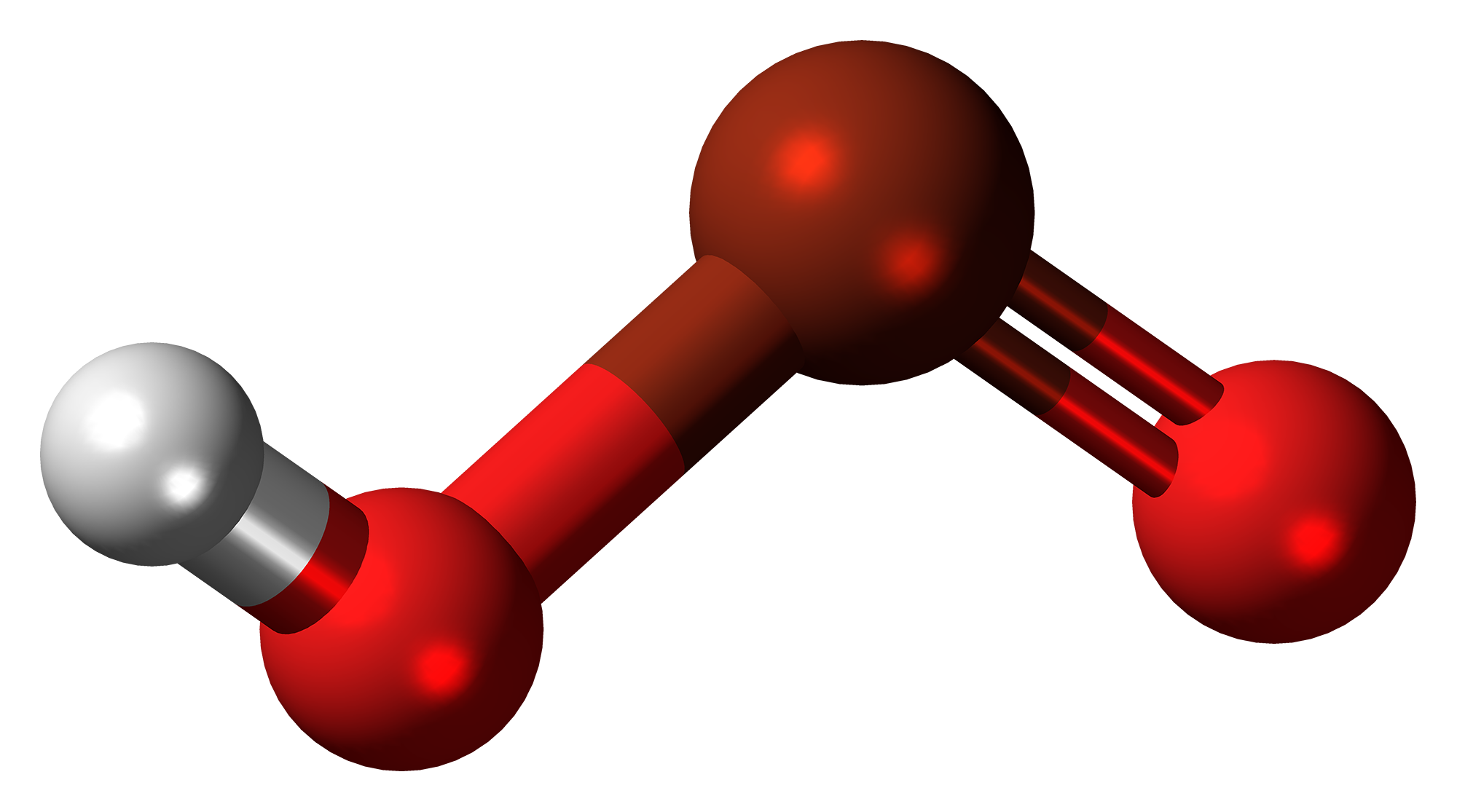

Names
- IUPAC names hydroxy-λ^{3}-bromanone hydroxidooxidobromine bromous acid

Identifiers
CAS Number	37691-27-3
3D model (JSmol)	Interactive image
ChEBI	CHEBI:29247
ChemSpider	145144
PubChem CID	165616
CompTox Dashboard (EPA)	DTXSID80276549
- InChI: InChI=1S/BrHO2/c2-1-3/h(H,2,3) Key: DKSMCEUSSQTGBK-UHFFFAOYSA-N; InChI=1/BrHO2/c2-1-3/h(H,2,3) Key: DKSMCEUSSQTGBK-UHFFFAOYAC
- SMILES: O[Br+][O-]

Properties
Chemical formula	HBrO_{2}
Molar mass	112.910 g·mol^{−1}
Conjugate base	Bromite

Related compounds
Other anions	Hydrobromic acid; Hypobromous acid; Bromic acid; Perbromic acid
- Except where otherwise noted, data are given for materials in their standard state (at 25 °C [77 °F], 100 kPa). verify (what is ?) Infobox references

Bromous acid is the inorganic compound with the formula of HBrO_{2}. It is an unstable compound, although salts of its conjugate base – bromites – have been isolated. In acidic solution, bromites decompose to bromine.

== Discovery ==
In 1905, Richards A. H. proved the existence of bromous acid through a series of experiments involving silver nitrate (AgNO_{3}) and bromine. The reaction of excess cold aqueous to form hypobromous acid (HBrO), silver bromide (AgBr) and nitric acid (HNO_{3}):

Br_{2} + AgNO_{3} + H_{2}O → HBrO + AgBr + HNO_{3}

Richards discovered that the effect of adding excess liquid bromine in a concentrated silver nitrate (AgNO_{3}) resulted in a different reaction mechanism. From numbers of equivalent portions of acid bromine formed from the previous reaction, the ratio between oxygen and bromine was calculated, with the exact value of O:Br (0.149975:0.3745), suggesting the acid compound contains two oxygen atom to one bromine atom. Thus, the chemical structure of the acid compound was deducted as HBrO_{2}.

According to Richards, hypobromous acid (HBrO) arises by the reaction of bromine and silver nitrate solution:

Br_{2} + AgNO_{3} + H_{2}O → HBrO + AgBr + HNO_{3}
2 AgNO_{3} + HBrO + Br_{2} + H_{2}O → HBrO_{2} + 2 AgBr + 2 HNO_{3}

== Isomerism ==
The molecule HBrO_{2} has a bent structure with ∠(H−O−Br) angles of 106.1°. HOBrO also adopts a non-planar conformation with one isomer structure (2a) adopting a dihedral angle ∠(H−O−Br−O) of 74.2°. Moreover, the planar structures of two other isomers (2b-cis and 2c-trans) are transition state for fast enantiomerization.

Another study identified three isomers: HOOBr, HOBrO, and HBr(O)O.

== Synthesis ==
A oxidation reaction between hypobromous acid (HBrO) and hypochlorous acid (HClO) can be used to produce bromous acid (HBrO_{2}) and hydrochloric acid (HCl).

HBrO + HClO → HBrO_{2} + HCl

A redox reaction of hypobromous acid (HBrO) can form bromous acid (HBrO_{2}) as its product:

HBrO + H_{2}O → HBrO_{2} + 2 H^{+} + 2 e^{−}

The disproportionation reaction of two equivalents hypobromous acid (HBrO) results in the formation of both bromous acid (HBrO_{2}) and hydrobromic acid (HBr):

2 HBrO → HBrO_{2} + HBr

A rearrangement reaction, which results from the syn-proportion of bromic acid (HBrO_{3}) and hydrobromic acid (HBr) gives bromous acid (HBrO_{2}):

2 HBrO_{3} + HBr → 3 HBrO_{2}

== Salts ==
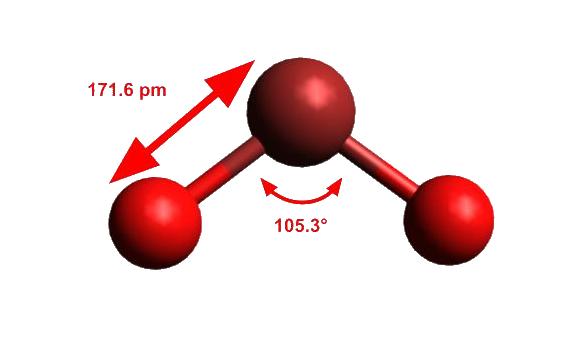
The bromite ion in sodium bromite.

The salts NaBrO_{2}·3H_{2}O and Ba(BrO_{2})_{2}·H_{2}O have been crystallized. Upon treatment of these aqueous solutions with salts of Pb^{2+}, Hg^{2+}, and Ag^{+}, the corresponding heavy metal bromites precipitate as solids.

== Belousov–Zhabotinsky reaction ==
Bromous acid is a product of the Belousov–Zhabotinsky reaction resulting from the combination of potassium bromate, cerium(IV) sulfate, propanedioic acid and citric acid in dilute sulfuric acid. Bromous acid is an intermediate stage of the reaction between bromate ion (BrO_{3}^{−} ) and bromine (Br^{−}):

BrO_{3}^{−} + 2 Br^{−} → HBrO_{2} + HBrO

Other relevant reactions in such oscillating reactions are:

HBrO_{2} + BrO_{3}^{−} + H^{+} → 2 BrO_{2}^{•} + H_{2}O
2 HBrO_{2} → BrO_{3}^{−} + HOBr + H^{+}

Bromites reduce permanganates to manganates (VI):

2 MnO_{4}^{−} + BrO_{2}^{−} + OH^{−} → 2 MnO_{4}^{2−} + BrO_{3}^{−} + H_{2}O

== pK_{a} measurement ==
The acid dissociation constant of bromous acid, K_{a} = ([H^{+}][BrO_{2}^{−}])/[HBrO_{2}] , was determined using different methods.

The value of the pK_{a} for bromous acid was estimated in research studying the decomposition of bromites. The research measured the rate of bromite decomposition as a function of hydrogen and bromite ion concentrations. The experimental data of the log of the initial velocity were plotted against pH. Using this method, the estimated pK_{a} value for bromous acid was 6.25.

Using another method, the pK_{a} for bromous acid was measured based on the initial velocity of the reaction between sodium bromites and potassium iodine in a pH range of 2.9–8.0, at 25 °C and ionic strength of 0.06 M. The first order dependence of the initial velocity of this disproportionation reaction on [H^{+}] in a pH range of 4.5–8.0. The value of acid dissociation constant measured by this method is K_{a} = (3.7±0.9)×10^{−4} M and pK_{a} = 3.43±0.05.

== Reactivity ==
In comparison to other oxygen-centered oxidants (hypohalites, anions of peroxides) and in line with its low basicity, bromite is a rather weak nucleophile. Rate constants of bromite towards carbocations and acceptor-substituted olefins are by 1–3 orders of magnitude lower than the ones measured with hypobromite.
