= Bromic acid =

- Skeletal model of bromic acid

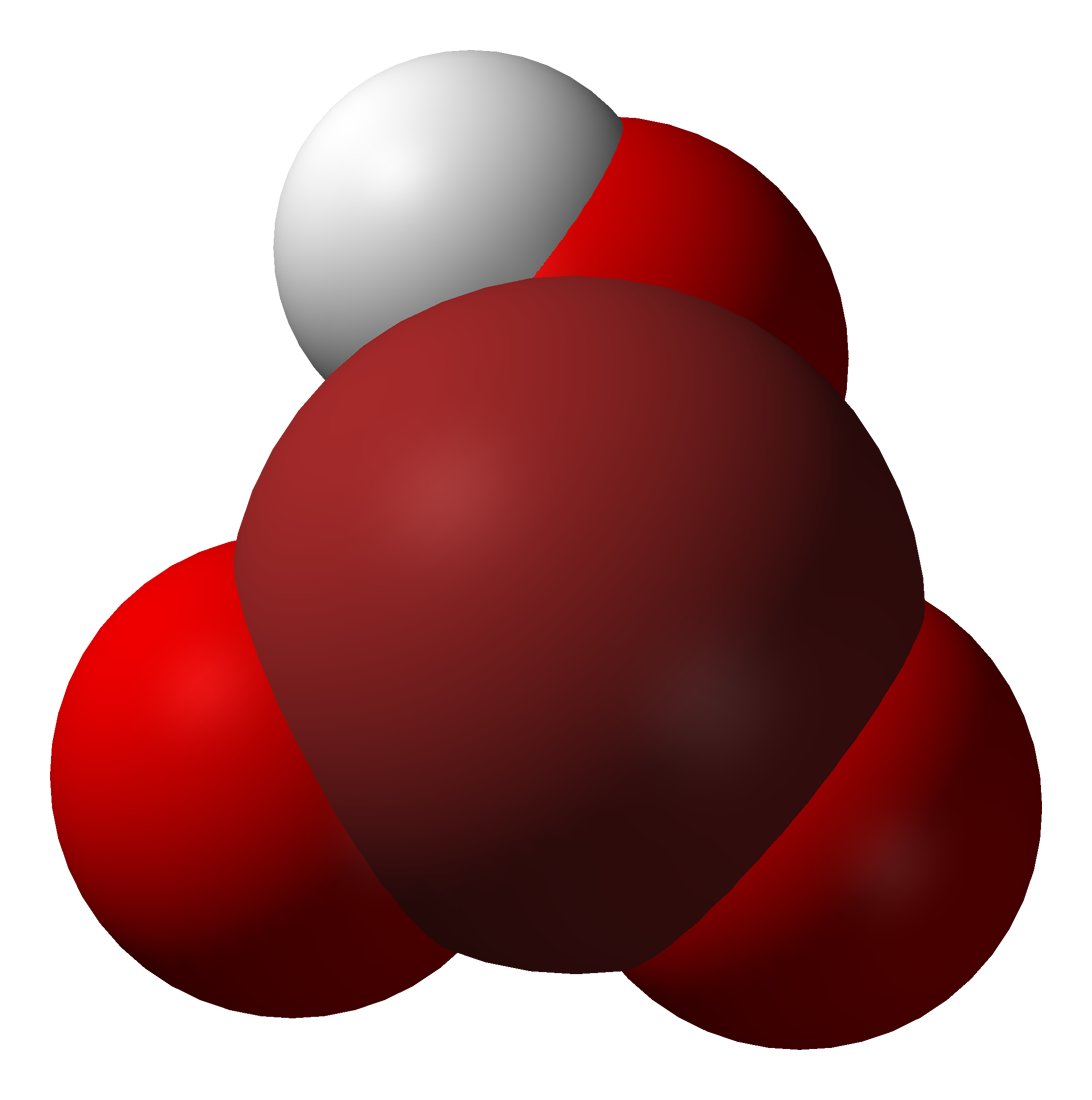
- Spacefill model of bromic acid

Names
- IUPAC name Bromic acid
- Other names Bromic(V) acid Hydrogen bromate

Identifiers
CAS Number	7789-31-3
3D model (JSmol)	Interactive image; Interactive image
ChEBI	CHEBI:49382
ChEMBL	ChEMBL1161635
ChemSpider	22853
ECHA InfoCard	100.029.235
EC Number	232-158-3
Gmelin Reference	25861
MeSH	Bromic+acid
PubChem CID	24445
UNII	908X3OZ87J
CompTox Dashboard (EPA)	DTXSID7064861
- InChI: InChI=1S/BrHO3/c2-1(3)4/h(H,2,3,4) Key: SXDBWCPKPHAZSM-UHFFFAOYSA-N; InChI=1/BrHO3/c2-1(3)4/h(H,2,3,4) Key: SXDBWCPKPHAZSM-UHFFFAOYAE
- SMILES: O[Br+2]([O-])[O-]; O=Br(=O)O

Properties
Chemical formula	HBrO_{3}
Molar mass	128.909 g·mol^{−1}
Acidity (pK_{a})	−2
Conjugate base	Bromate
- Except where otherwise noted, data are given for materials in their standard state (at 25 °C [77 °F], 100 kPa). verify (what is ?) Infobox references

Bromic acid, also known as hydrogen bromate, is an oxoacid with the molecular formula HBrO_{3}. It only exists in aqueous solution. It is a colorless solution that turns yellow at room temperature as it decomposes to bromine. Bromic acid and bromates are powerful oxidizing agents and are common ingredients in Belousov–Zhabotinsky reactions. Belousov-Zhabotinsky reactions are a classic example of non-equilibrium thermodynamics.

== Dissociation ==
Low concentrations dissociate completely to hydronium and bromate while high concentrations decompose to form bromine. Bromic acid's high instability can be explained because the positively charged hypervalent bromine is connected to the electronegative OH group.

== Structure ==
There are several isomers of HBrO_{3}. The calculated bond lengths are listed below based on three high level theories G2MP2, CCSD(T), and QCISD(T).

Species	HOOOBr	HOOBrO	HOBrO_{2}	HBrO_{3}
Br–O bridged (Å)	1.867	1.919	1.844	—
Br–O terminal (Å)	—	1.635	1.598	1.586

The large energy barriers between these structures do not make isomerization possible. HOBrO_{2} is the most stable isomer and is the one pictured above.

== Synthesis ==
Bromic acid is the product of a reaction of barium bromate and sulfuric acid.

Ba(BrO_{3})_{2} + H_{2}SO_{4} → 2 HBrO_{3} + BaSO_{4}

Barium sulfate is insoluble in water and forms a precipitate. The aqueous bromic acid can be decanted removing the barium sulfate.
