= Diiodine hexaoxide =

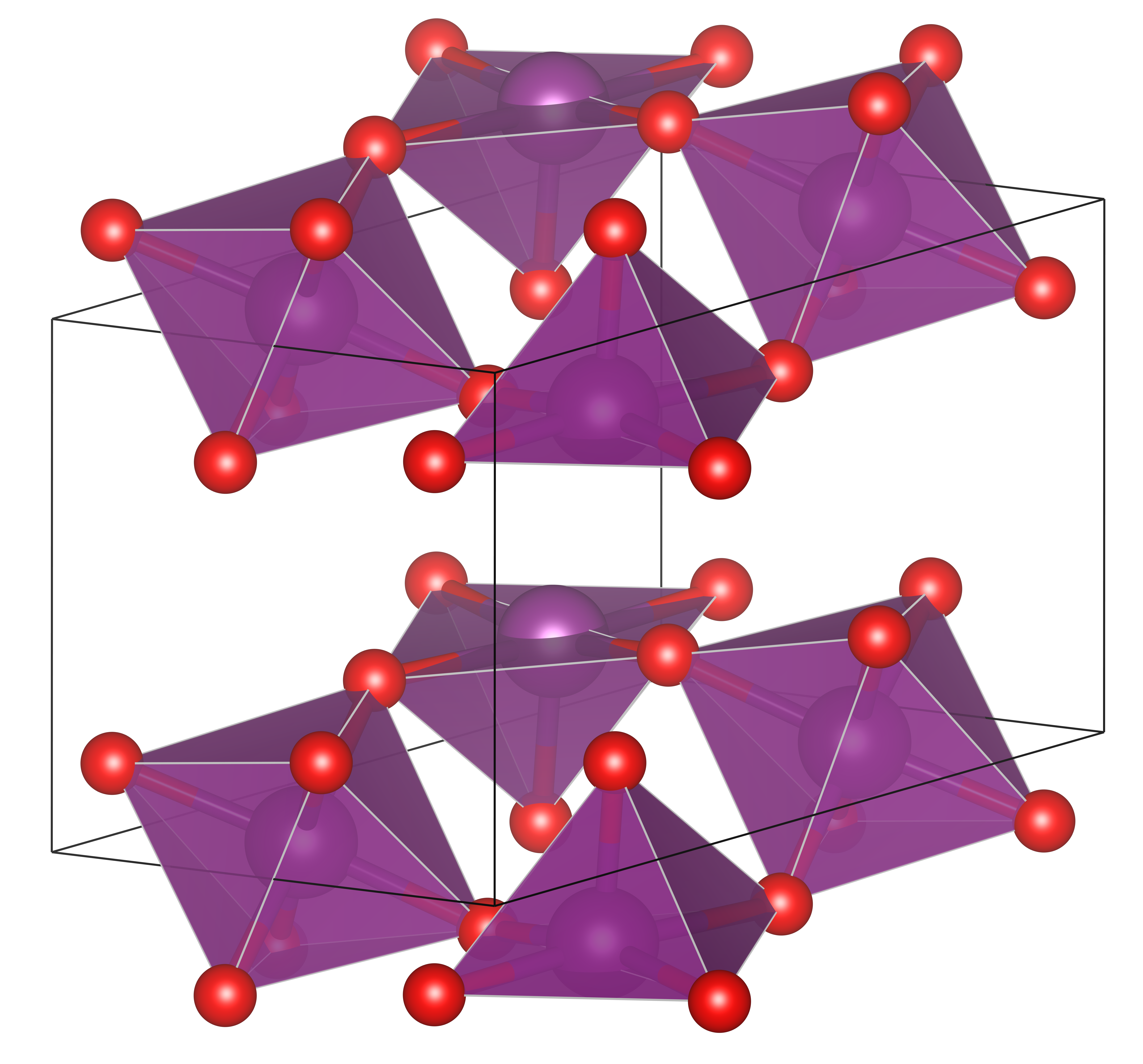

Names
- Other names iodine trioxide, diiodine(V,VII) oxide

Identifiers
CAS Number	65355-99-9
3D model (JSmol)	Interactive image
- InChI: InChI=1S/HIO4.IO2/c2-1(3,4)5;2-1-3/h(H,2,3,4,5);/q;+1/p-1 Key: XOXXWUXXUGTNSE-UHFFFAOYSA-M
- SMILES: O=[I+]=O.O=[I-](=O)(=O)=O

Properties
Chemical formula	I_{2}O_{6}
Molar mass	349.803 g·mol^{−1}
Appearance	yellow crust or crystals
Density	4.53 g/cm^{3}
Melting point	179 °C (354 °F; 452 K) (dec.)
- Except where otherwise noted, data are given for materials in their standard state (at 25 °C [77 °F], 100 kPa). Infobox references

Diiodine hexaoxide is a chemical compound of oxygen and iodine with the chemical formula I_{2}O_{6}. It belongs to the class of iodine oxides, and is a mixed oxide, consisting of iodine(V) and iodine(VII) oxidation states.

== Synthesis ==
Reaction of periodic acid with iodic acid in sulfuric acid:

HIO_{3} + H_{5}IO_{6} → I_{2}O_{6} + 3H_{2}O

The thermal decomposition of meta-periodic acid in vacuum also leads to the formation of diiodine hexoxide.

== Chemical properties ==
Below 100 °C, diiodine hexaoxide can be stored stably in the absence of moisture. When dissolved in water, an exothermic reaction to form iodine and periodic acid takes place. When heated above 179 °C, decomposition into diiodine pentoxide can be observed, with the reaction going to completion at 197 °C:

2 I_{2}O_{6} → 2 I_{2}O_{5} + O_{2}

Structurally, the compound is a polymeric iodine(V,VII) oxide consisting of repeating I_{4}O_{12}, units contradicting previous sources describing it as "iodyl periodate" (IO_{2}^{+}IO_{4}^{-}). As a solid, the compound crystallizes in the space group P1 (space group no. 2) with the lattice constants a = 500.6 pm, b = 674.1 pm, c = 679.5 pm, α = 97.1°, β = 96.43°, γ = 105.36° with one formula unit per unit cell.

== Uses ==
Diiodine hexaoxide has been investigated for potential use as a neutralizer for chemical and biological agents in combination with aluminium powder.

== See also ==
- Diiodine tetroxide
- Orthoperiodic acid
- Diiodine pentoxide
- Iodine oxides
