= Properties of nonmetals (and metalloids) by group =

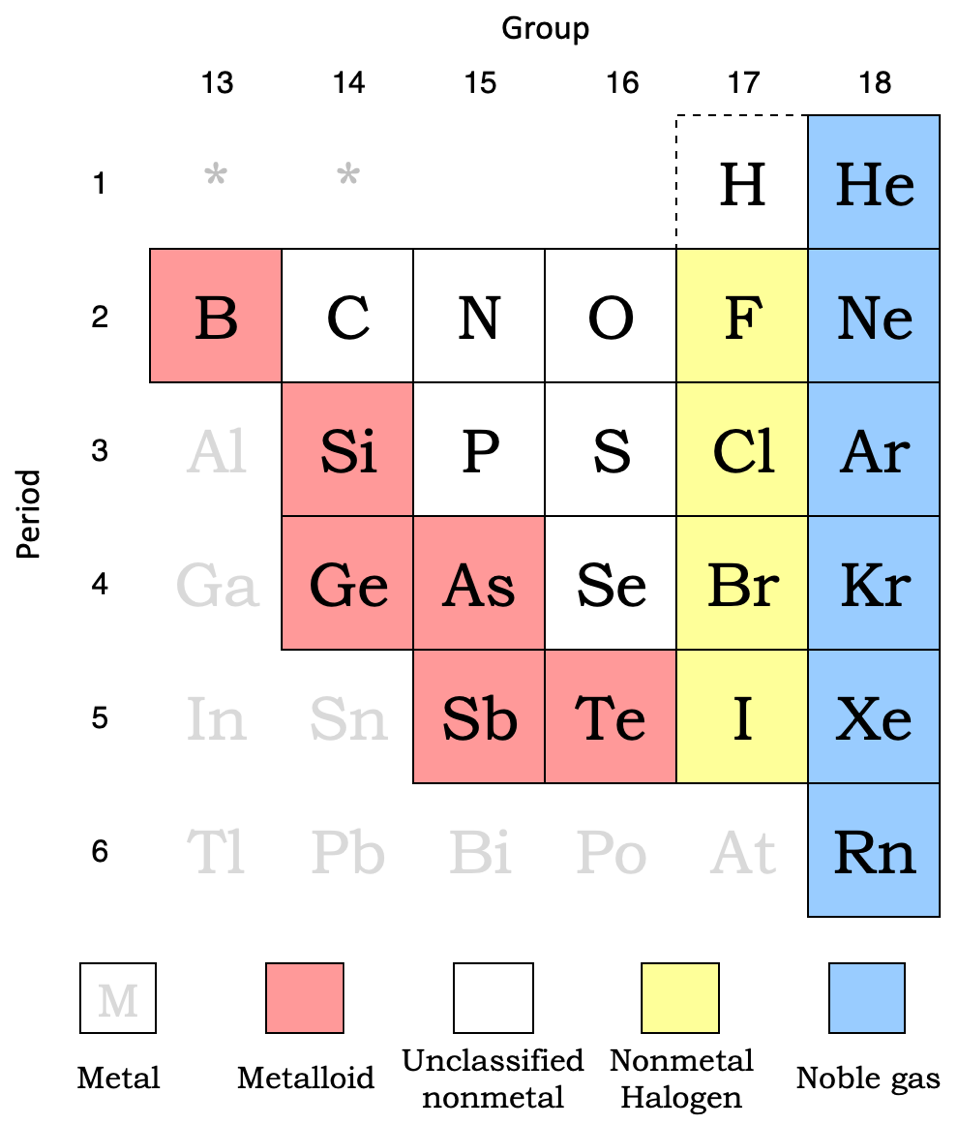
Periodic table extract showing the nonmetallic elements. H is normally placed over Li in Group 1. It is shown here over F for comparative purposes. The asterisks show further alternative positions for H. The elements shown as metalloids are those commonly recognized as such by authors who include such a class. The status of At has not been confirmed; it is predicted to be a monatomic metal. Og, which is located in period 7 below radon, is not shown here. It is predicted to be a metallic looking semi-conducting solid.

Nonmetals show more variability in their properties than do metals. Metalloids are included here since they behave predominately as chemically weak nonmetals.

Physically, they nearly all exist as diatomic or monatomic gases, or polyatomic solids having more substantial (open-packed) forms and relatively small atomic radii, unlike metals, which are nearly all solid and close-packed, and mostly have larger atomic radii. If solid, they have a submetallic appearance (with the exception of sulfur) and are brittle, as opposed to metals, which are lustrous, and generally ductile or malleable; they usually have lower densities than metals; are mostly poorer conductors of heat and electricity; and tend to have significantly lower melting points and boiling points than those of most metals.

Chemically, the nonmetals mostly have higher ionisation energies, higher electron affinities (nitrogen and the noble gases have negative electron affinities) and higher electronegativity values (Note: An ionisation energy of less than 750 kJ/mol is taken to be low, 750–1000 is moderate, and > 1000 is high (> 2000 is very high); an electron affinity of less than 70 kJ/mol is taken to be low, 70–140 is moderate, and > 140 is high; an electronegativity of less than 1.8 is taken to be low; 1.8–2.2 is moderate; and > than 2.2 is high (> 4.0 is very high).) than metals noting that, in general, the higher an element's ionisation energy, electron affinity, and electronegativity, the more nonmetallic that element is. Nonmetals, including (to a limited extent) xenon and probably radon, usually exist as anions or oxyanions in aqueous solution; they generally form ionic or covalent compounds when combined with metals (unlike metals, which mostly form alloys with other metals); and have acidic oxides whereas the common oxides of nearly all metals are basic.

== Properties ==
Abbreviations used in this section are: AR Allred-Rochow; CN coordination number; and MH Moh's hardness

=== Group 1 ===
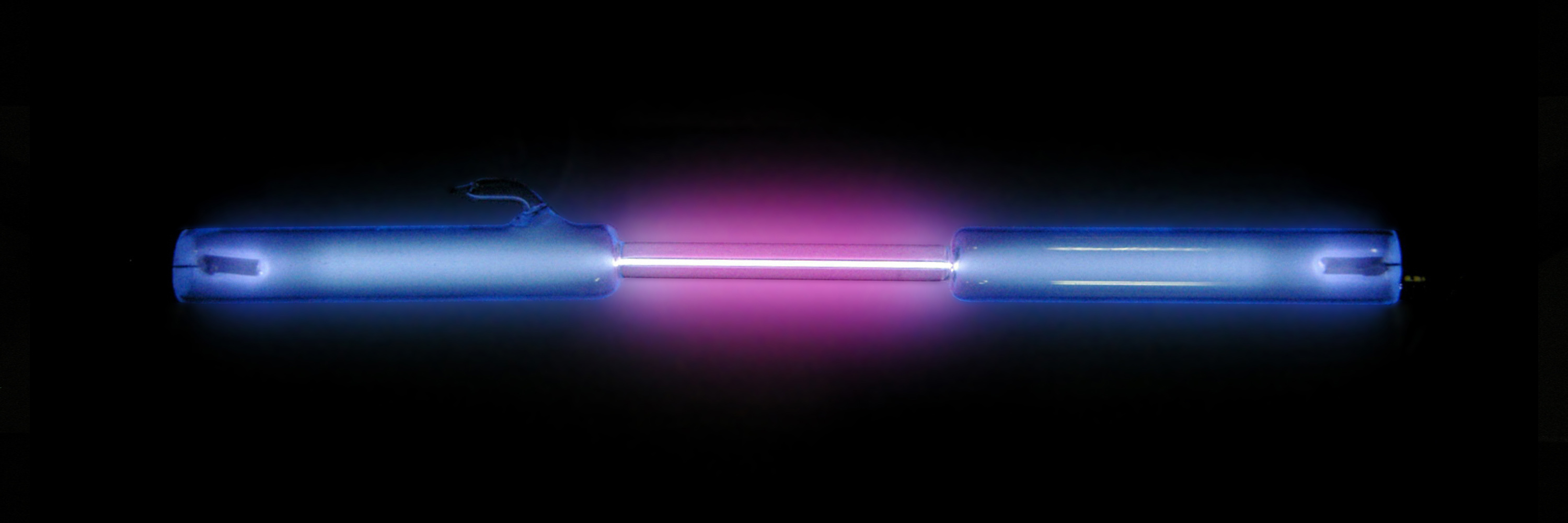
Hydrogen in an electrical discharge tube

Hydrogen is a colourless, odourless, and comparatively unreactive diatomic gas with a density of 8.988 × 10^{−5} g/cm^{3} and is about 14 times lighter than air. It condenses to a colourless liquid −252.879 °C and freezes into an ice- or snow-like solid at −259.16 °C. The solid form has a hexagonal crystalline structure and is soft and easily crushed. Hydrogen is an insulator in all of its forms. It has a high ionisation energy (1312.0 kJ/mol), moderate electron affinity (73 kJ/mol), and moderate electronegativity (2.2). Hydrogen is a poor oxidising agent (H_{2} + 2e^{−} → 2H^{–} = –2.25 V at pH 0). Its chemistry, most of which is based around its tendency to acquire the electron configuration of the noble gas helium, is largely covalent in nature, noting it can form ionic hydrides with highly electropositive metals, and alloy-like hydrides with some transition metals. The common oxide of hydrogen (H_{2}O) is a neutral oxide. (Note: The common oxide is the most stable oxide for that element)

=== Group 13 ===
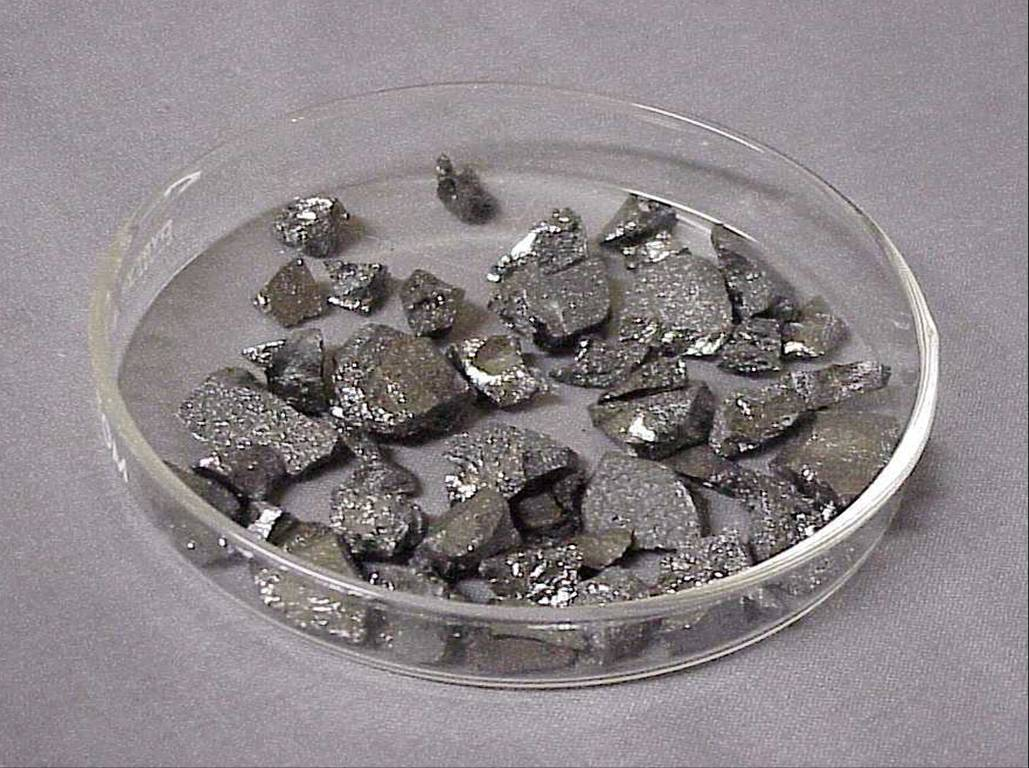
Boron

Boron is a lustrous, barely reactive solid with a density 2.34 g/cm^{3} (cf. aluminium 2.70), and is hard (MH 9.3) and brittle. It melts at 2076 °C (cf. steel ~1370 °C) and boils at 3927 °C. Boron has a complex rhombohedral crystalline structure (CN 5+). It is a semiconductor with a band gap of about 1.56 eV. Boron has a moderate ionisation energy (800.6 kJ/mol), low electron affinity (27 kJ/mol), and moderate electronegativity (2.04). Being a metalloid, most of its chemistry is nonmetallic in nature. Boron is a poor oxidizing agent (B_{12} + 3e → BH_{3} = –0.15 V at pH 0). While it bonds covalently in nearly all of its compounds, it can form intermetallic compounds and alloys with transition metals of the composition M_{n}B, if n > 2. The common oxide of boron (B_{2}O_{3}) is weakly acidic.

=== Group 14 ===
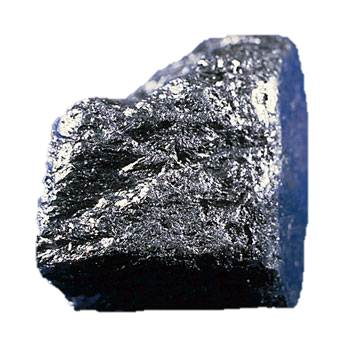
Carbon, as graphite

Carbon (as graphite, its most thermodynamically stable form) is a lustrous and comparatively unreactive solid with a density of 2.267 g/cm^{3}, and is soft (MH 0.5) and brittle. It sublimes to vapour at 3642 °C. Carbon has a hexagonal crystalline structure (CN 3). It is a semimetal in the direction of its planes, with an electrical conductivity exceeding that of some metals, and behaves as a semiconductor in the direction perpendicular to its planes. It has a high ionisation energy (1086.5 kJ/mol), moderate electron affinity (122 kJ/mol), and high electronegativity (2.55). Carbon is a poor oxidising agent (C + 4e^{−} → CH_{4} = 0.13 V at pH 0). Its chemistry is largely covalent in nature, noting it can form salt-like carbides with highly electropositive metals. The common oxide of carbon (CO_{2}) is a medium-strength acidic oxide.

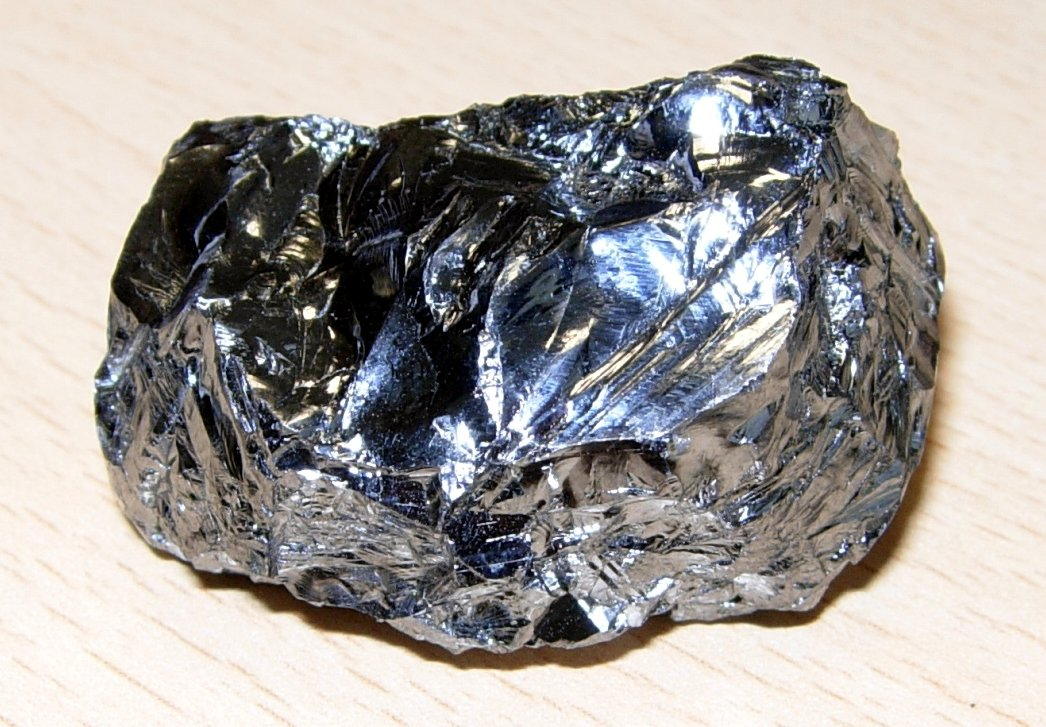
Silicon has a blue-grey metallic lustre.

Silicon is a metallic-looking relatively unreactive solid with a density of 2.3290 g/cm^{3}, and is hard (MH 6.5) and brittle. It melts at 1414 °C (cf. steel ~1370 °C) and boils at 3265 °C. Silicon has a diamond cubic structure (CN 4). It is a non-conductive with a band gap of about 1.11 eV. Silicon has a moderate ionisation energy (786.5 kJ/mol), moderate electron affinity (134 kJ/mol), and moderate electronegativity (1.9). It is a poor oxidising agent (Si + 4e → Si_{4} = –0.147 at pH 0). As a metalloid the chemistry of silicon is largely covalent in nature, noting it can form alloys with metals such as iron and copper. The common oxide of silicon (SiO_{2}) is weakly acidic.

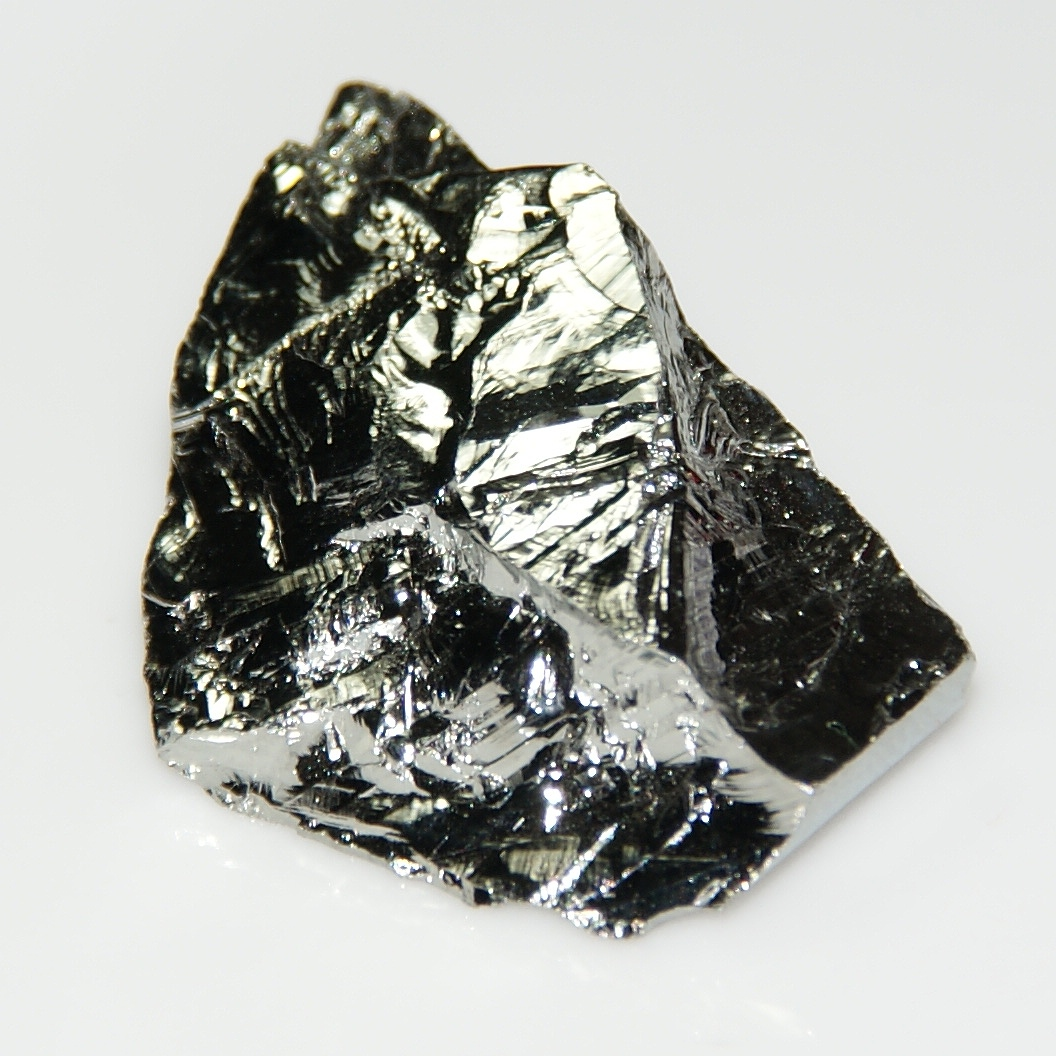
Germanium

Germanium is a shiny, mostly unreactive grey-white solid with a density of 5.323 g/cm^{3} (about two-thirds that of iron), and is hard (MH 6.0) and brittle. It melts at 938.25 °C (cf. silver 961.78 °C) and boils at 2833 °C. Germanium has a diamond cubic structure (CN 4). It is a semiconductor with a band gap of about 0.67 eV. Germanium has a moderate ionisation energy (762 kJ/mol), moderate electron affinity (119 kJ/mol), and moderate electronegativity (2.01). It is a poor oxidising agent (Ge + 4e → GeH_{4} = –0.294 at pH 0). As a metalloid the chemistry of germanium is largely covalent in nature, noting it can form alloys with metals such as aluminium and gold. Most alloys of germanium with metals lack metallic or semimetallic conductivity. The common oxide of germanium (GeO_{2}) is amphoteric.

=== Group 15 ===
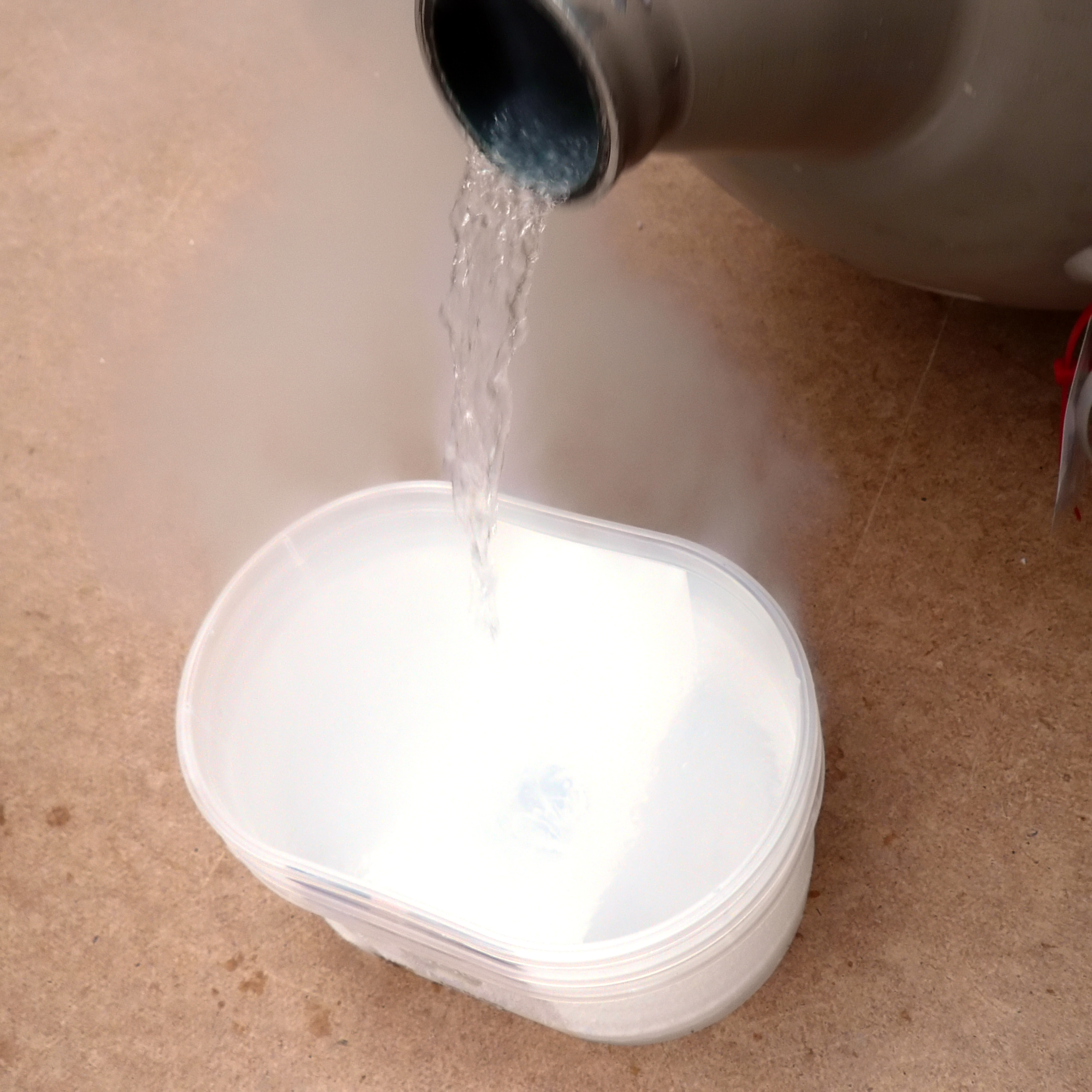
Liquid nitrogen

Nitrogen is a colourless, odourless, and relatively inert diatomic gas with a density of 1.251 × 10^{−3} g/cm^{3} (marginally heavier than air). It condenses to a colourless liquid at −195.795 °C and freezes into an ice- or snow-like solid at −210.00 °C. The solid form (density 0.85 g/cm^{3}; cf. lithium 0.534) has a hexagonal crystalline structure and is soft and easily crushed. Nitrogen is an insulator in all of its forms. It has a high ionisation energy (1402.3 kJ/mol), low electron affinity (–6.75 kJ/mol), and high electronegativity (3.04). The latter property manifests in the capacity of nitrogen to form usually strong hydrogen bonds, and its preference for forming complexes with metals having low electronegativities, small cationic radii, and often high charges (+3 or more). Nitrogen is a poor oxidising agent (N_{2} + 6e^{−} → 2NH_{3} = −0.057 V at pH 0). Only when it is in a positive oxidation state, that is, in combination with oxygen or fluorine, are its compounds good oxidising agents, for example, 2NO_{3}^{−} → N_{2} = 1.25 V. Its chemistry is largely covalent in nature; anion formation is energetically unfavourable owing to strong inter electron repulsions associated with having three unpaired electrons in its outer valence shell, hence its negative electron affinity. The common oxide of nitrogen (NO) is weakly acidic. Many compounds of nitrogen are less stable than diatomic nitrogen, so nitrogen atoms in compounds seek to recombine if possible and release energy and nitrogen gas in the process, which can be leveraged for explosive purposes.

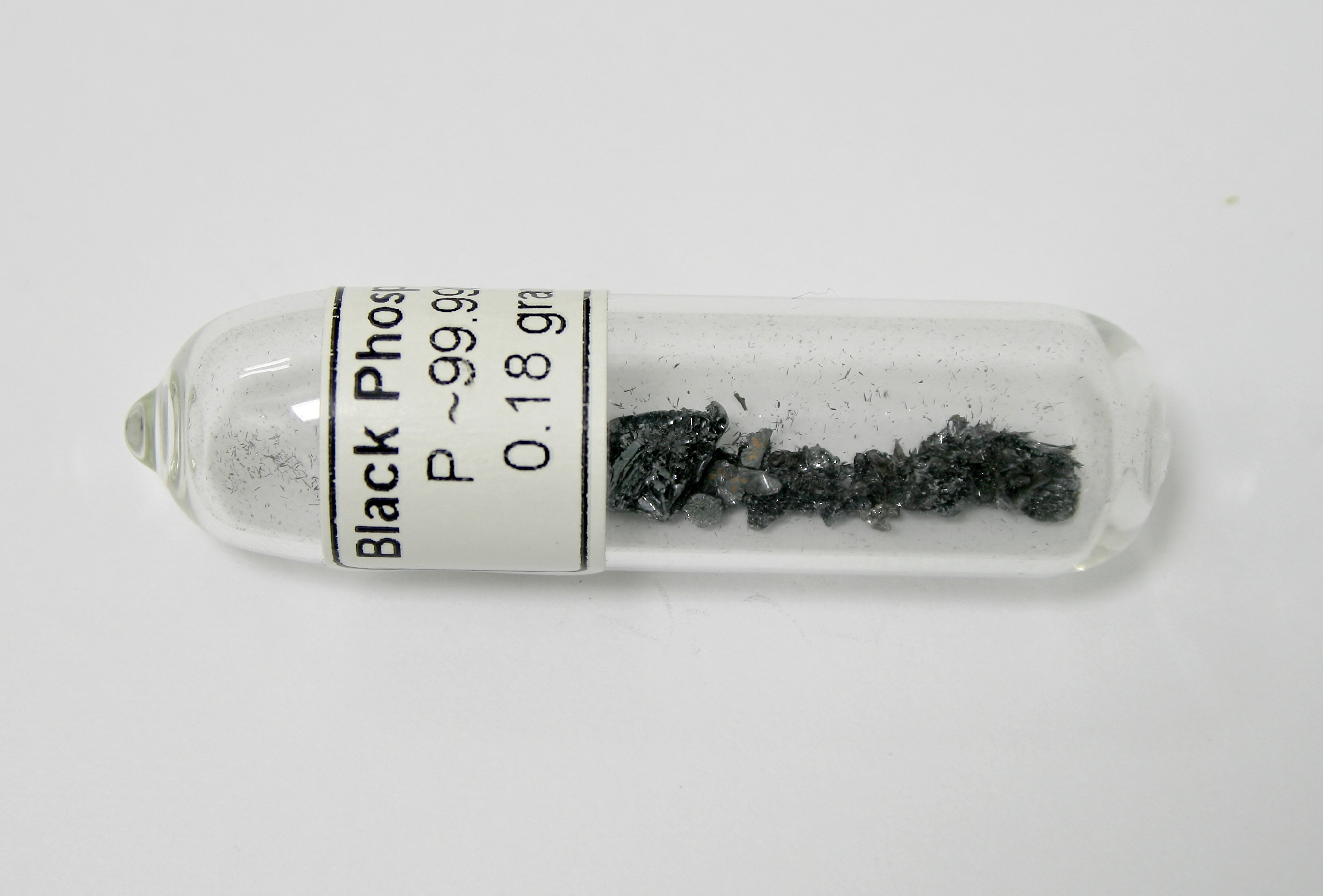
Phosphorus, as black phosphorus

Phosphorus in its most thermodynamically stable black form, is a lustrous and comparatively unreactive solid with a density of 2.69 g/cm^{3}, and is soft (MH 2.0) and has a flaky comportment. It sublimes at 620 °C. Black phosphorus has an orthorhombic crystalline structure (CN 3). It is a semiconductor with a band gap of 0.3 eV. It has a high ionisation energy (1086.5 kJ/mol), moderate electron affinity (72 kJ/mol), and moderate electronegativity (2.19). In comparison to nitrogen, phosphorus usually forms weak hydrogen bonds, and prefers to form complexes with metals having high electronegativities, large cationic radii, and often low charges (usually +1 or +2. Phosphorus is a poor oxidising agent (P_{4} + 3e^{−} → PH_{3}^{–} = −0.046 V at pH 0 for the white form, −0.088 V for the red). Its chemistry is largely covalent in nature, noting it can form salt-like phosphides with highly electropositive metals. Compared to nitrogen, electrons have more space on phosphorus, which lowers their mutual repulsion and results in anion formation requiring less energy. The common oxide of phosphorus (P_{2}O_{5}) is a medium-strength acidic oxide.

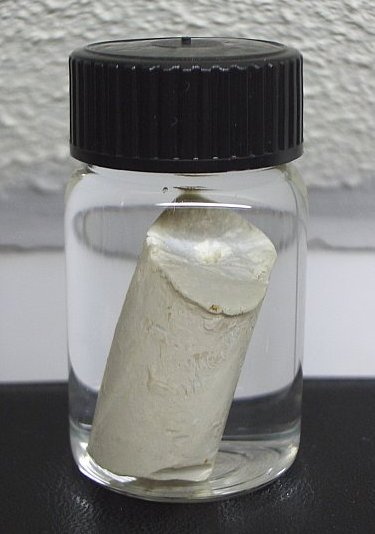
White phosphorus, stored under water to prevent its oxidation

When assessing periodicity in the properties of the elements it needs to be borne in mind that the quoted properties of phosphorus tend to be those of its least stable white form rather than, as is the case with all other elements, the most stable form. White phosphorus is the most common, industrially important, and easily reproducible allotrope. For those reasons it is the standard state of the element. Paradoxically, it is also thermodynamically the least stable, as well as the most volatile and reactive form. It gradually changes to red phosphorus. This transformation is accelerated by light and heat, and samples of white phosphorus almost always contain some red phosphorus and, accordingly, appear yellow. For this reason, white phosphorus that is aged or otherwise impure is also called yellow phosphorus. When exposed to oxygen, white phosphorus glows in the dark with a very faint tinge of green and blue. It is highly flammable and pyrophoric (self-igniting) upon contact with air. White phosphorus has a density of 1.823 g/cm^{3}, is soft (MH 0.5) as wax, pliable and can be cut with a knife. It melts at 44.15 °C and, if heated rapidly, boils at 280.5 °C; it otherwise remains solid and transforms to violet phosphorus at 550 °C. It has a body-centred cubic structure, analogous to that of manganese, with unit cell comprising 58 P_{4} molecules. It is an insulator with a band gap of about 3.7 eV.

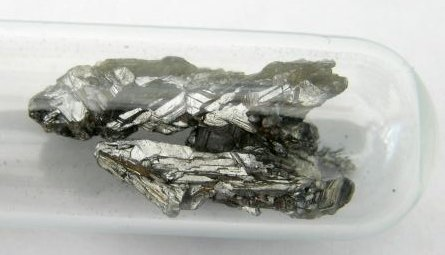
Arsenic, sealed in a container to prevent tarnishing

Arsenic is a grey, metallic looking solid which is stable in dry air but develops a golden bronze patina in moist air, which blackens on further exposure. It has a density of 5.727 g/cm^{3}, and is brittle and moderately hard (MH 3.5; more than aluminium; less than iron). Arsenic sublimes at 615 °C. It has a rhombohedral polyatomic crystalline structure (CN 3). Arsenic is a semimetal, with an electrical conductivity of around 3.9 × 10^{4} S•cm^{−1} and a band overlap of 0.5 eV. It has a moderate ionisation energy (947 kJ/mol), moderate electron affinity (79 kJ/mol), and moderate electronegativity (2.18). Arsenic is a poor oxidising agent (As + 3e → AsH_{3} = –0.22 at pH 0). As a metalloid, its chemistry is largely covalent in nature, noting it can form brittle alloys with metals, and has an extensive organometallic chemistry. Most alloys of arsenic with metals lack metallic or semimetallic conductivity. The common oxide of arsenic (As_{2}O_{3}) is acidic but weakly amphoteric.

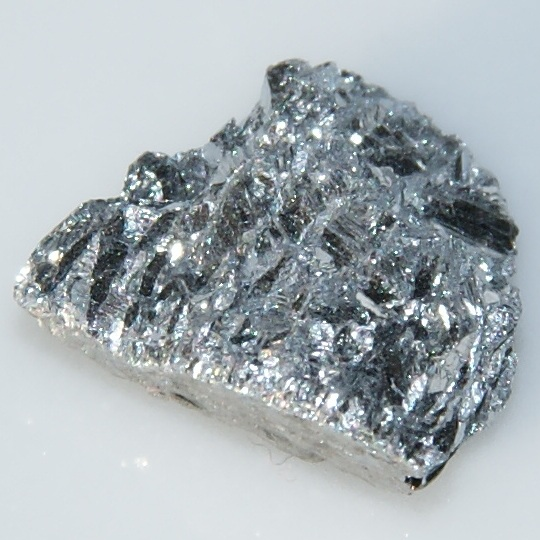
Antimony, showing its brilliant lustre

Antimony is a silver-white solid with a blue tint and a brilliant lustre. It is stable in air and moisture at room temperature. Antimony has a density of 6.697 g/cm^{3}, and is moderately hard (MH 3.0; about the same as copper). It has a rhombohedral crystalline structure (CN 3). Antimony melts at 630.63 °C and boils at 1635 °C. It is a semimetal, with an electrical conductivity of around 3.1 × 10^{4} S•cm^{−1} and a band overlap of 0.16 eV. Antimony has a moderate ionisation energy (834 kJ/mol), moderate electron affinity (101 kJ/mol), and moderate electronegativity (2.05). It is a poor oxidising agent (Sb + 3e → SbH_{3} = –0.51 at pH 0). As a metalloid, its chemistry is largely covalent in nature, noting it can form alloys with one or more metals such as aluminium, iron, nickel, copper, zinc, tin, lead and bismuth, and has an extensive organometallic chemistry. Most alloys of antimony with metals have metallic or semimetallic conductivity. The common oxide of antimony (Sb_{2}O_{3}) is amphoteric.

=== Group 16 ===
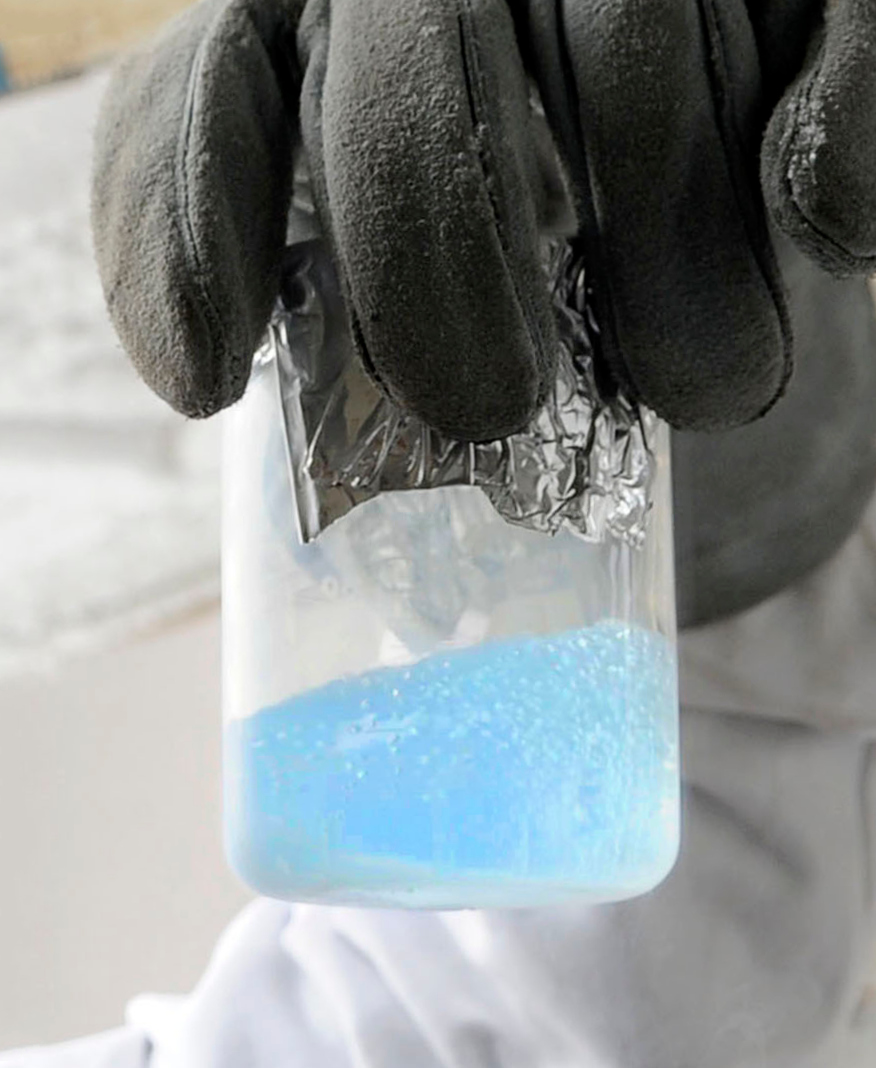
Liquid oxygen (boiling)

In the United States alone, more than $10 billion is lost each year to corrosion...Much of this corrosion is the rusting of iron and steel...The oxidizing agent causing all of this corrosion is usually oxygen.

— MD Joesten, L Hogg, and ME Castellion
In The world of chemistry (2007, p. 217)

Oxygen is a colourless, odourless, and unpredictably reactive diatomic gas with a gaseous density of 1.429 × 10^{−3} g/cm^{3} (marginally heavier than air). It is generally unreactive at room temperature. Thus, sodium metal will "retain its metallic lustre for days in the presence of absolutely dry air and can even be melted (m.p. 97.82 °C) in the presence of dry oxygen without igniting". On the other hand, oxygen can react with many inorganic and organic compounds either spontaneously or under the right conditions, (such as a flame or a spark) [or ultra-violet light?]. It condenses to pale blue liquid −182.962 °C and freezes into a light blue solid at −218.79 °C. The solid form (density 0.0763 g/cm^{3}) has a cubic crystalline structure and is soft and easily crushed. Oxygen is an insulator in all of its forms. It has a high ionisation energy (1313.9 kJ/mol), moderately high electron affinity (141 kJ/mol), and high electronegativity (3.44). Oxygen is a strong oxidising agent (O_{2} + 4e → 2H_{2}O = 1.23 V at pH 0). Metal oxides are largely ionic in nature.

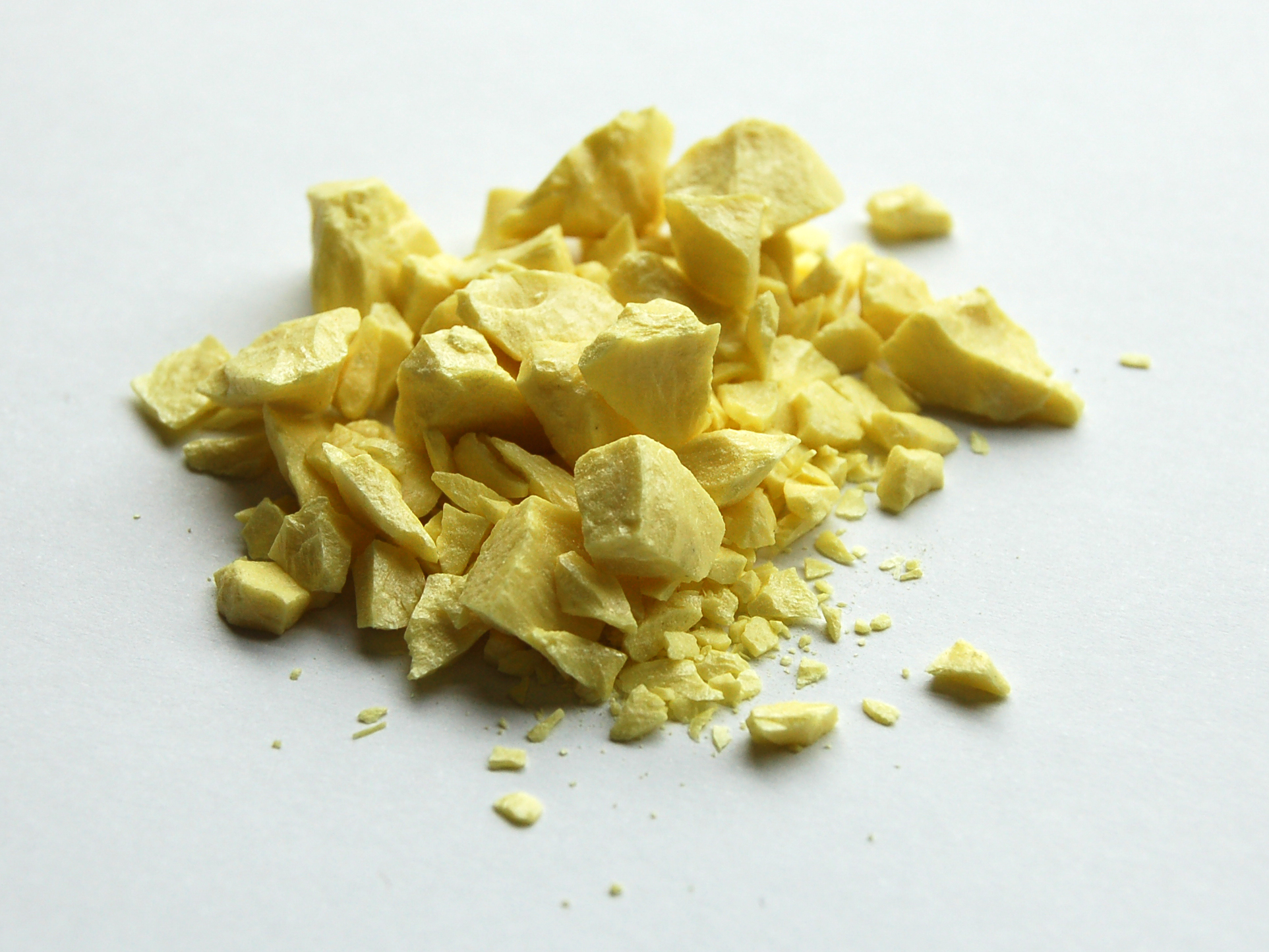
Sulfur

Sulfur is a bright-yellow moderately reactive solid. It has a density of 2.07 g/cm^{3} and is soft (MH 2.0) and brittle. It melts to a light yellow liquid 95.3 °C and boils at 444.6 °C. Sulfur has an abundance on earth one-tenth that of oxygen. It has an orthorhombic polyatomic (CN 2) crystalline structure, and is brittle. Sulfur is an insulator with a band gap of 2.6 eV, and a photoconductor meaning its electrical conductivity increases a million-fold when illuminated. Sulfur has a moderate ionisation energy (999.6 kJ/mol), high electron affinity (200 kJ/mol), and high electronegativity (2.58). It is a poor oxidising agent (S_{8} + 2e^{−} → H_{2}S = 0.14 V at pH 0). The chemistry of sulfur is largely covalent in nature, noting it can form ionic sulfides with highly electropositive metals. The common oxide of sulfur (SO_{3}) is strongly acidic.

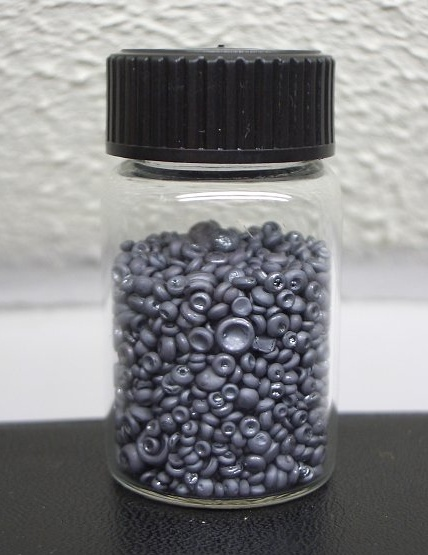
Selenium

Selenium is a metallic-looking, moderately reactive solid with a density of 4.81 g/cm^{3} and is soft (MH 2.0) and brittle. It melts at 221 °C to a black liquid and boils at 685 °C to a dark yellow vapour. Selenium has a hexagonal polyatomic (CN 2) crystalline structure. It is a semiconductor with a band gap of 1.7 eV, and a photoconductor meaning its electrical conductivity increases a million-fold when illuminated. Selenium has a moderate ionisation energy (941.0 kJ/mol), high electron affinity (195 kJ/mol), and high electronegativity (2.55). It is a poor oxidising agent (Se + 2e^{−} → H_{2}Se = −0.082 V at pH 0). The chemistry of selenium is largely covalent in nature, noting it can form ionic selenides with highly electropositive metals. The common oxide of selenium (SeO_{3}) is strongly acidic.

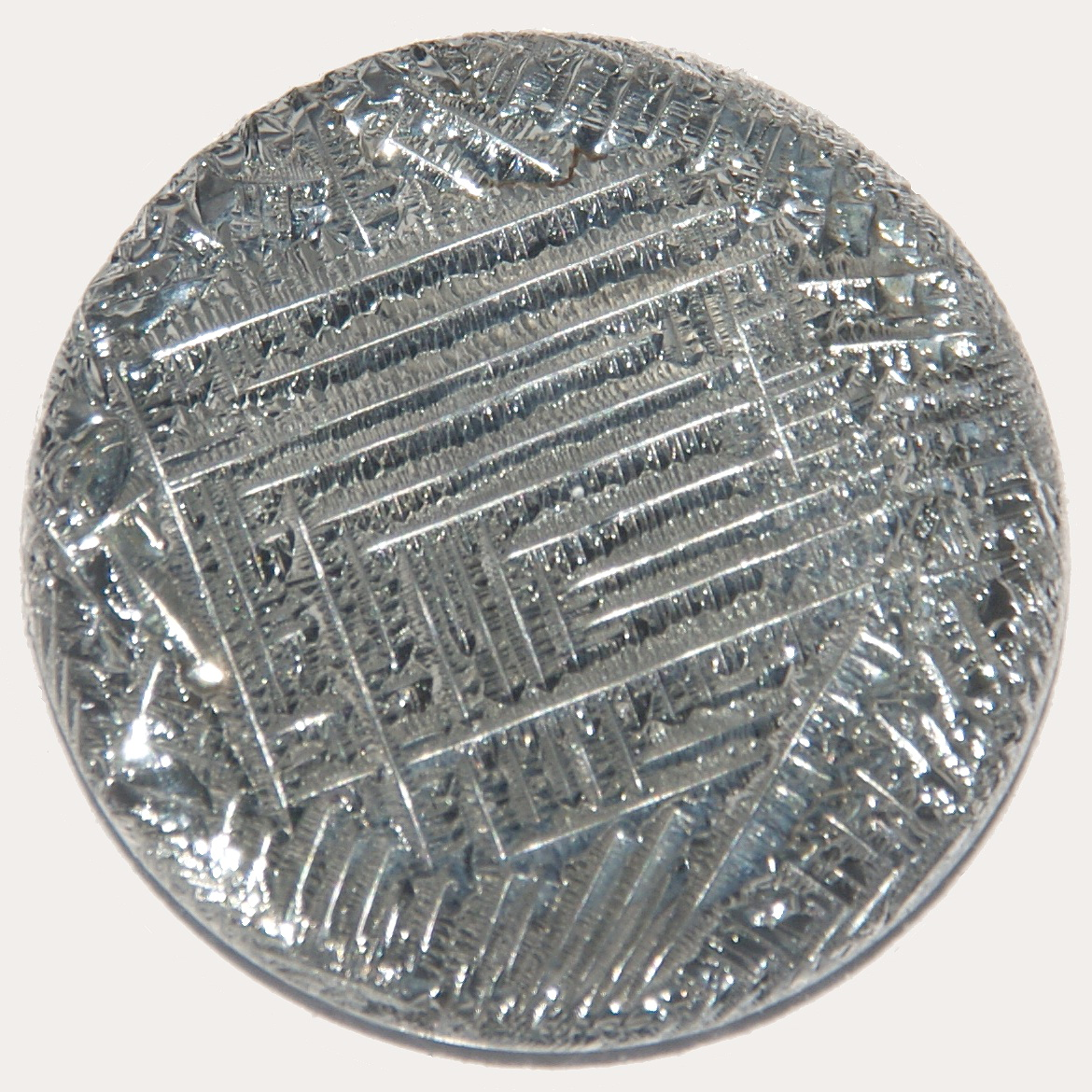
Tellurium

Tellurium is a silvery-white, moderately reactive, shiny solid, that has a density of 6.24 g/cm^{3} and is soft (MH 2.25) and brittle. It is the softest of the commonly recognised metalloids. Tellurium reacts with boiling water, or when freshly precipitated even at 50 °C, to give the dioxide and hydrogen: Te + 2 H_{2}O → TeO_{2} + 2 H_{2}. It has a melting point of 450 °C and a boiling point of 988 °C. Tellurium has a polyatomic (CN 2) hexagonal crystalline structure. It is a semiconductor with a band gap of 0.32 to 0.38 eV. Tellurium has a moderate ionisation energy (869.3 kJ/mol), high electron affinity (190 kJ/mol), and moderate electronegativity (2.1). It is a poor oxidising agent (Te + 2e^{−} → H_{2}Te = −0.45 V at pH 0). The chemistry of tellurium is largely covalent in nature, noting it has an extensive organometallic chemistry and that many tellurides can be regarded as metallic alloys. The common oxide of tellurium (TeO_{2}) is amphoteric.

=== Group 17 ===
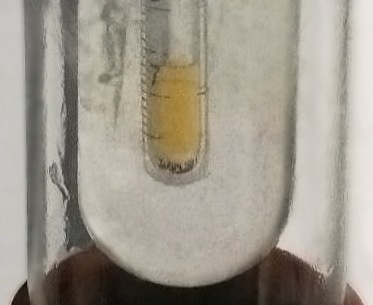
Liquid fluorine, in a cryogenic bath

Fluorine is an extremely toxic and reactive pale yellow diatomic gas that, with a gaseous density of 1.696 × 10^{−3} g/cm^{3}, is about 40% heavier than air. Its extreme reactivity is such that it was not isolated (via electrolysis) until 1886 and was not isolated chemically until 1986. Its occurrence in an uncombined state in nature was first reported in 2012, but is contentious. Fluorine condenses to a pale yellow liquid at −188.11 °C and freezes into a colourless solid at −219.67 °C. The solid form (density 1.7 g/cm^{−3}) has a cubic crystalline structure and is soft and easily crushed. Fluorine is an insulator in all of its forms. It has a high ionisation energy (1681 kJ/mol), high electron affinity (328 kJ/mol), and high electronegativity (3.98). Fluorine is a powerful oxidising agent (F_{2} + 2e → 2HF = 2.87 V at pH 0); "even water, in the form of steam, will catch fire in an atmosphere of fluorine". Metal fluorides are generally ionic in nature.

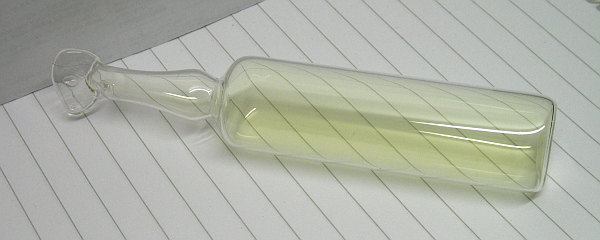
Chlorine gas

Chlorine is an irritating green-yellow diatomic gas that is extremely reactive, and has a gaseous density of 3.2 × 10^{−3} g/cm^{3} (about 2.5 times heavier than air). It condenses at −34.04 °C to an amber-coloured liquid and freezes at −101.5 °C into a yellow crystalline solid. The solid form (density 1.9 g/cm^{−3}) has an orthorhombic crystalline structure and is soft and easily crushed. Chlorine is an insulator in all of its forms. It has a high ionisation energy (1251.2 kJ/mol), high electron affinity (349 kJ/mol; higher than fluorine), and high electronegativity (3.16). Chlorine is a strong oxidising agent (Cl_{2} + 2e → 2HCl = 1.36 V at pH 0). Metal chlorides are largely ionic in nature. The common oxide of chlorine (Cl_{2}O_{7}) is strongly acidic.

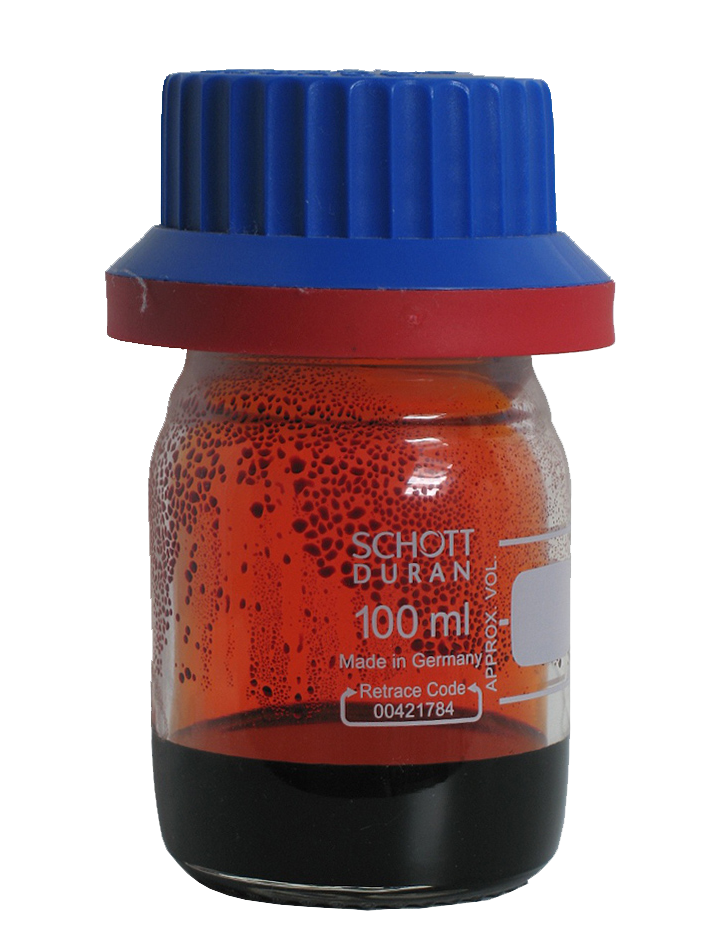
Liquid bromine

Bromine is a deep brown diatomic liquid that is quite reactive, and has a liquid density of 3.1028 g/cm^{3}. It boils at 58.8 °C and solidifies at −7.3 °C to an orange crystalline solid (density 4.05 g/cm^{−3}). It is the only element, apart from mercury, known to be a liquid at room temperature. The solid form, like chlorine, has an orthorhombic crystalline structure and is soft and easily crushed. Bromine is an insulator in all of its forms. It has a high ionisation energy (1139.9 kJ/mol), high electron affinity (324 kJ/mol), and high electronegativity (2.96). Bromine is a strong oxidising agent (Br_{2} + 2e → 2HBr = 1.07 V at pH 0). Metal bromides are largely ionic in nature. The unstable common oxide of bromine (Br_{2}O_{5}) is strongly acidic.

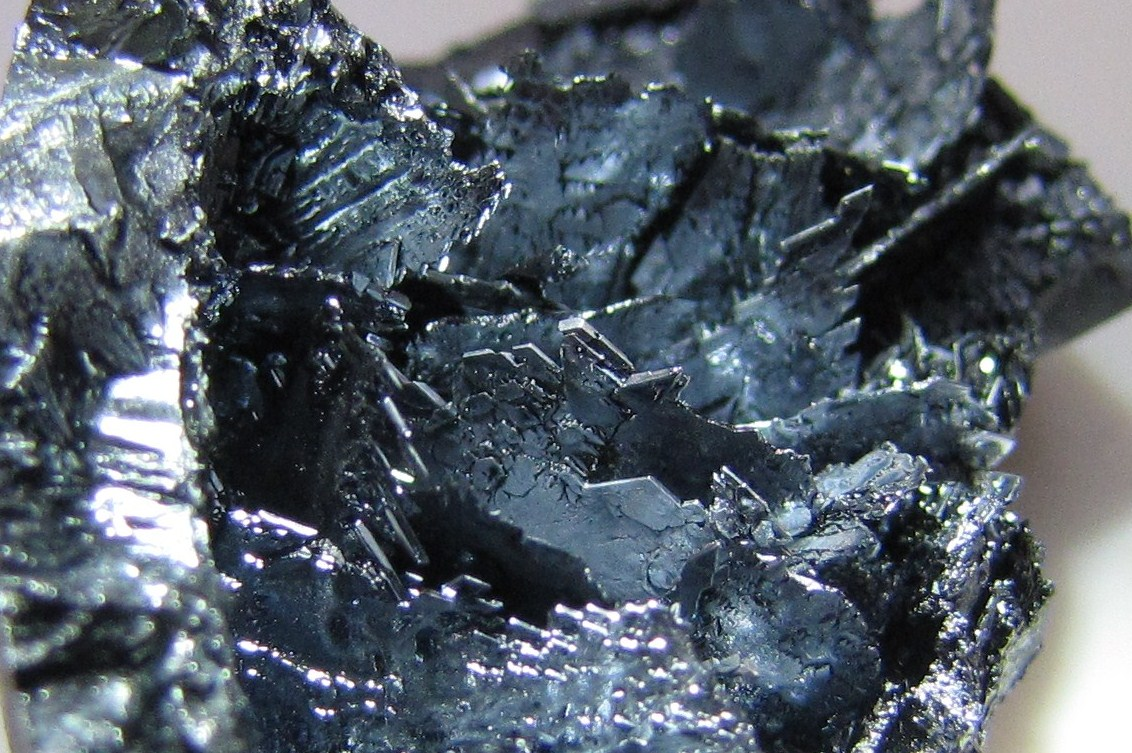
Iodine crystals

Iodine, the rarest of the nonmetallic halogens, is a metallic looking solid that is moderately reactive, and has a density of 4.933 g/cm^{3}. It melts at 113.7 °C to a brown liquid and boils at 184.3 °C to a violet-coloured vapour. It has an orthorhombic crystalline structure with a flaky habit. Iodine is semiconductor in the direction of its planes, with a band gap of about 1.3 eV and a conductivity of 1.7 × 10^{−8} S•cm^{−1} at room temperature. This is higher than selenium but lower than boron, the least electrically conducting of the recognised metalloids. Iodine is an insulator in the direction perpendicular to its planes. It has a high ionisation energy (1008.4 kJ/mol), high electron affinity (295 kJ/mol), and high electronegativity (2.66). Iodine is a moderately strong oxidising agent (I_{2} + 2e → 2I^{−} = 0.53 V at pH 0). Metal iodides are predominantly ionic in nature. The only stable oxide of iodine (I_{2}O_{5}) is strongly acidic.

Astatine, is the rarest naturally occurring element in the Earth's crust, occurring only as the decay product of various heavier elements. All of astatine's isotopes are short-lived; the most stable is astatine-210, with a half-life of 8.1 hours. Astatine is sometimes described as probably being a black solid (assuming it follows this trend), or as having a metallic appearance. Astatine is predicted to be a semiconductor, with a band gap of about 0.7 eV. It has a moderate ionisation energy (900 kJ/mol), high electron affinity (233 kJ/mol), and moderate electronegativity (2.2). Astatine is a moderately weak oxidising agent (At_{2} + 2e → 2At^{−} = 0.3 V at pH 0).

=== Group 18 ===
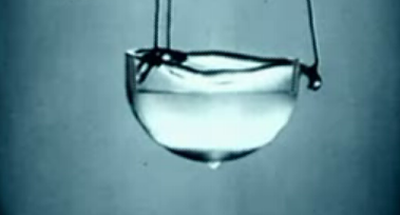
Liquified helium

Helium has a density of 1.785 × 10^{−4} g/cm^{3} (cf. air 1.225 × 10^{−3} g/cm^{3}), liquifies at −268.928 °C, and cannot be solidified at normal pressure. It has the lowest boiling point of all of the elements. Liquid helium exhibits super-fluidity, superconductivity, and near-zero viscosity; its thermal conductivity is greater than that of any other known substance (more than 1,000 times that of copper). Helium can only be solidified at −272.20 °C under a pressure of 2.5 MPa. It has a very high ionisation energy (2372.3 kJ/mol), low electron affinity (estimated at −50 kJ/mol), and high electronegativity (4.16 χSpec). No normal compounds of helium have so far been synthesised.

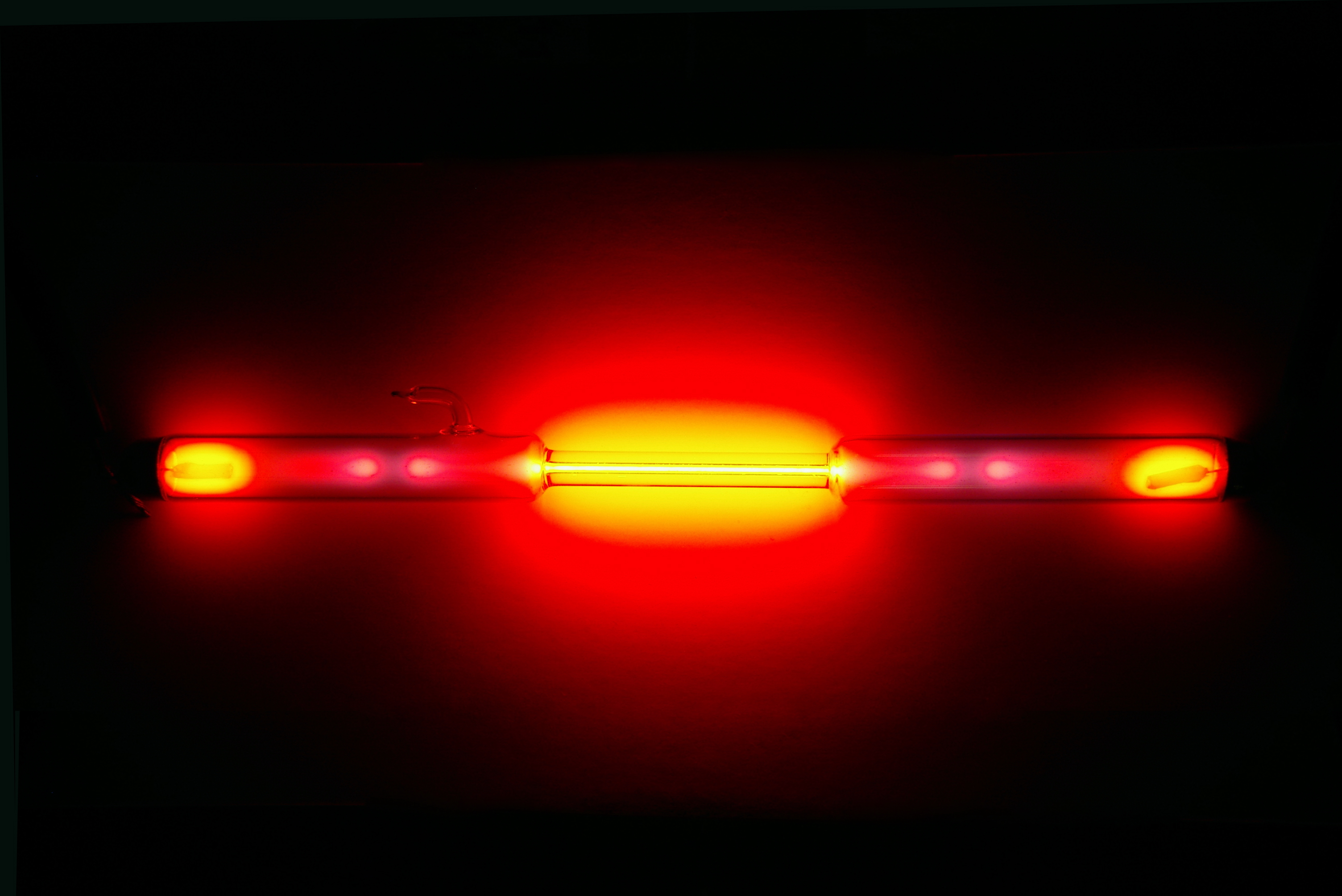
Neon in an electrical discharge tube

Neon has a density of 9.002 × 10^{−4} g/cm^{3}, liquifies at −245.95 °C, and solidifies at −248.45 °C. It has the narrowest liquid range of any element and, in liquid form, has over 40 times the refrigerating capacity of liquid helium and three times that of liquid hydrogen. Neon has a very high ionisation energy (2080.7 kJ/mol), low electron affinity (estimated at −120 kJ/mol), and very high electronegativity (4.787 χSpec). It is the least reactive of the noble gases; no normal compounds of neon have so far been synthesised.

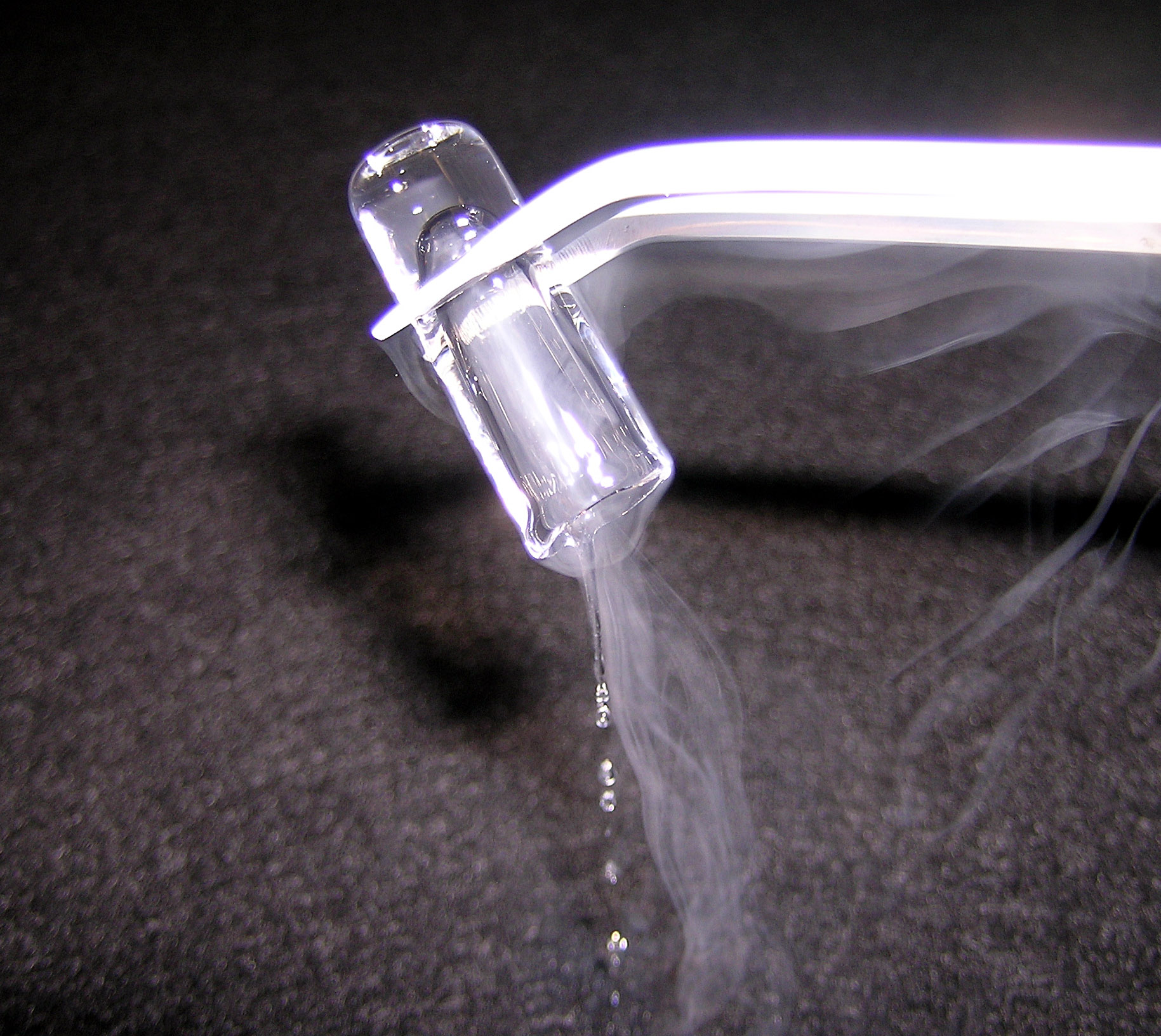
A small piece of rapidly melting solid argon

Argon has a density of 1.784 × 10^{−3} g/cm^{3}, liquifies at −185.848 °C, and solidifies at −189.34 °C. Although non-toxic, it is 38% denser than air and therefore considered a dangerous asphyxiant in closed areas. It is difficult to detect because (like all the noble gases) it is colourless, odourless, and tasteless. Argon has a high ionisation energy (1520.6 kJ/mol), low electron affinity (estimated at −96 kJ/mol), and high electronegativity (3.242 χSpec). One interstitial compound of argon, Ar_{1}C_{60}, is a stable solid at room temperature.

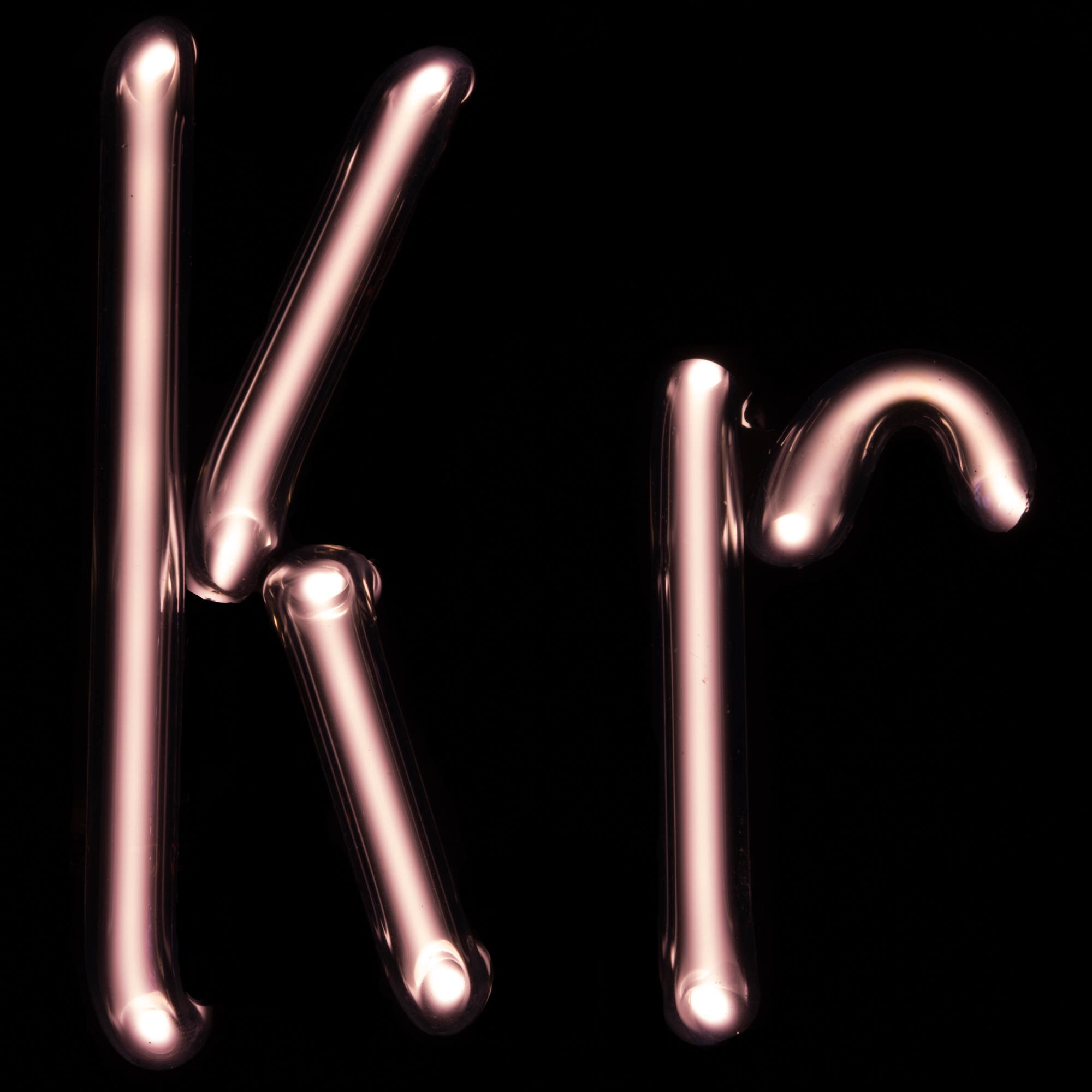
A Kr-shaped krypton discharge tube

Krypton has a density of 3.749 × 10^{−3} g/cm^{3}, liquifies at −153.415 °C, and solidifies at −157.37 °C. It has a high ionisation energy (1350.8 kJ/mol), low electron affinity (estimated at −60 kJ/mol), and high electronegativity (2.966 χSpec). Krypton can be reacted with fluorine to form the difluoride, KrF_{2}. The reaction of KrF_{2} with B(OTeF_{5})_{3} produces an unstable compound, Kr(OTeF_{5})_{2}, that contains a krypton-oxygen bond.

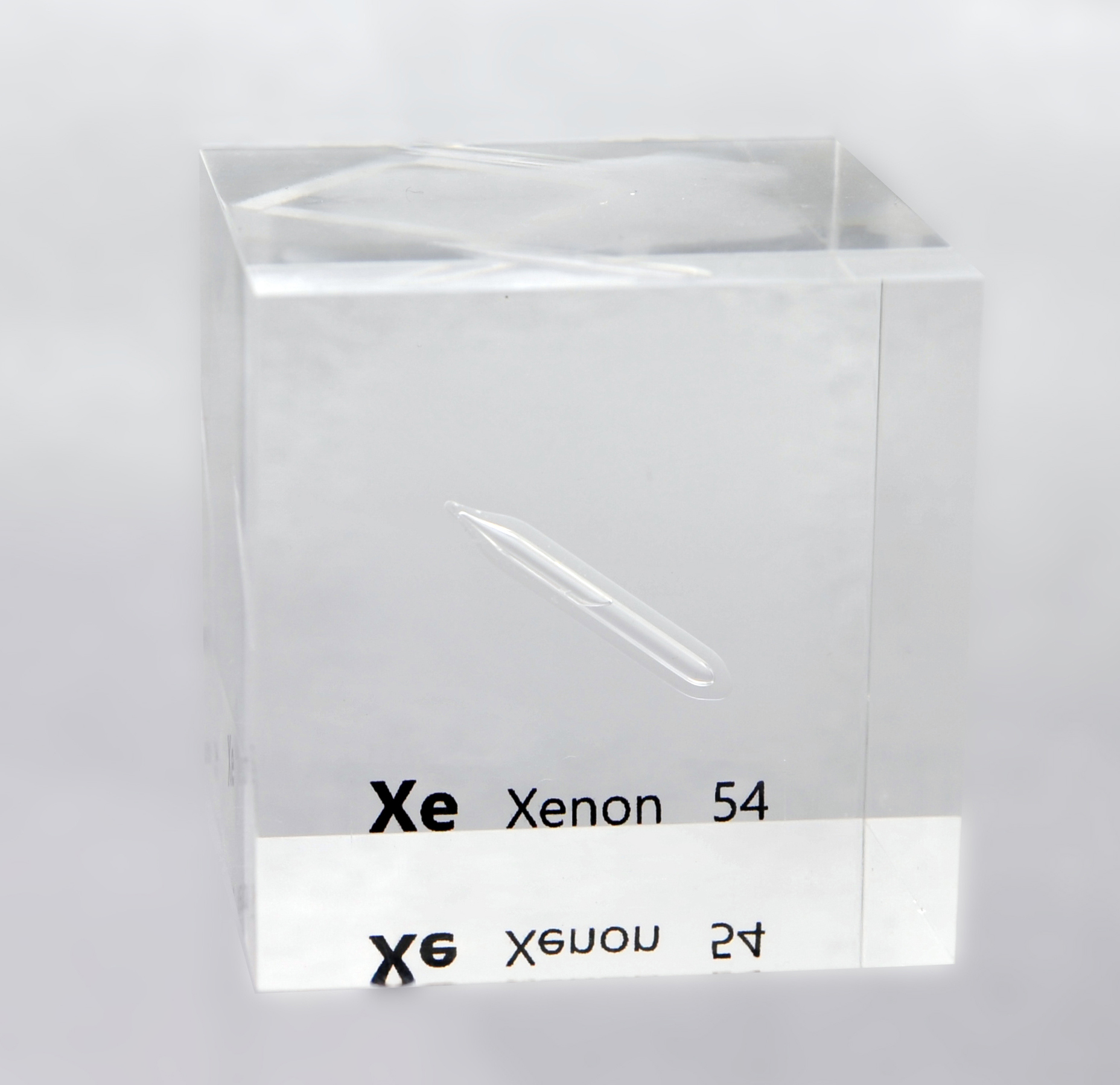
Pressurized xenon gas encapsulated in an acrylic cube

Xenon has a density of 5.894 × 10^{−3} g/cm^{3}, liquifies at −161.4 °C, and solidifies at −165.051 °C. It is non-toxic, and belongs to a select group of substances that penetrate the blood–brain barrier, causing mild to full surgical anesthesia when inhaled in high concentrations with oxygen. Xenon has a high ionisation energy (1170.4 kJ/mol), low electron affinity (estimated at −80 kJ/mol), and high electronegativity (2.582 χSpec). It forms a relatively large number of compounds, mostly containing fluorine or oxygen. An unusual ion containing xenon is the tetraxenonogold(II) cation, AuXe^{2+}_{4}, which contains Xe–Au bonds. This ion occurs in the compound AuXe_{4}(Sb_{2}F_{11})_{2}, and is remarkable in having direct chemical bonds between two notoriously unreactive atoms, xenon and gold, with xenon acting as a transition metal ligand. The compound Xe_{2}Sb_{2}F_{11} contains a Xe–Xe bond, the longest element-element bond known (308.71 pm = 3.0871 Å). The most common oxide of xenon (XeO_{3}) is strongly acidic.

Radon, which is radioactive, has a density of 9.73 × 10^{−3} g/cm^{3}, liquifies at −61.7 °C, and solidifies at −71 °C. It has a high ionisation energy (1037 kJ/mol), low electron affinity (estimated at −70 kJ/mol), and a high electronegativity (2.60 χSpec). The only confirmed compounds of radon, which is the rarest of the naturally occurring noble gases, are the difluoride RnF_{2}, and trioxide, RnO_{3}. It has been reported that radon is capable of forming a simple Rn^{2+} cation in halogen fluoride solution, which is highly unusual behaviour for a nonmetal, and a noble gas at that. Radon trioxide (RnO_{3}) is expected to be acidic.

Oganesson, the heaviest element on the periodic table, has only recently been synthesized. Owing to its short half-life, its chemical properties have not yet been investigated. Due to the significant relativistic destabilisation of the 7p_{3/2} orbitals, it is expected to be significantly reactive and behave more similarly to the group 14 elements, as it effectively has four valence electrons outside a pseudo-noble gas core. Its predicted melting and boiling points are 52±15 °C and 177±10 °C respectively, so that it is probably neither noble nor a gas; it is expected to have a density of about 6.6–7.4 g/cm^{3} around room temperature. It is expected to have a barely positive electron affinity (estimated as 5 kJ/mol) and a moderate ionisation energy of about 860 kJ/mol, which is rather low for a nonmetal and close to those of tellurium and astatine. The oganesson fluorides OgF_{2} and OgF_{4} are expected to show significant ionic character, suggesting that oganesson may have at least incipient metallic properties. The oxides of oganesson, OgO and OgO_{2}, are predicted to be amphoteric.

== See also ==
- Nonmetal – Category of chemical elements
- Nonmetallic material – How the term nonmetal is used in many disciplines

== Bibliography ==
- Brown WH & Rogers EP 1987, General, organic and biochemistry, 3rd ed., Brooks/Cole, Monterey, California, ISBN 0-534-06870-7
- Cotton FA, Darlington C & Lynch LD 1976, Chemistry: An investigative approach, Houghton Mifflin, Boston ISBN 978-0-395-21671-2
- "Elements Electrical Conductivity Reference Table – Angstrom Sciences". www.angstromsciences.com.
- Greenwood NN & Earnshaw A 2002, Chemistry of the elements, 2nd ed., Butterworth-Heinemann, ISBN 0-7506-3365-4
- Moeller T 1952, Inorganic chemistry: An advanced textbook, John Wiley & Sons, New York
- Wiberg N 2001, Inorganic chemistry, Academic Press, San Diego, ISBN 0-12-352651-5
- Wulfsberg G 1987, Principles of descriptive Inorganic chemistry, Brooks/Cole Publishing Company, Monterey, California ISBN 0-534-07494-4
- Yoder CH, Suydam FH & Snavely FA 1975, Chemistry, 2nd ed, Harcourt Brace Jovanovich, New York, ISBN 978-0-15-506470-6
