= Schuetze reagent =

Names
- Other names Schütze reagent

Identifiers
- Compounds; (SiO_{2}): Silica gel; (I_{2}O_{5}): Iodine pentoxide; (H_{2}SO_{4}): Sulfuric acid
| CAS Number | (SiO_{2}): 63231-67-4; (I_{2}O_{5}): 12029-98-0; (H_{2}SO_{4}): 7664-93-9 |
| PubChem CID | (SiO_{2}): 24261; (I_{2}O_{5}): 159402; (H_{2}SO_{4}): 1118 |
| UNII | ETJ7Z6XBU4 |

Properties
| Appearance | Yellow granules |
| Melting point | N/A |
| Boiling point | N/A |
| Solubility in water | Slightly soluble in water |

Hazards
- Occupational safety and health (OHS/OSH)
| Main hazards | Oxidizing solid, corrosive to skin |
- GHS labelling
| Pictograms | (GHS03: Oxidizing) (GHS05: Corrosive) (GHS08: Health hazard) |
| Signal word | Danger |
| Hazard statements | H314, H332, H350 |
| Precautionary statements | P201, P221, P264, P280, P301+P330+P331, P303+P361+P353, P310, P370+P378 |
| Flash point | N/A |
| Autoignition temperature | N/A |
| Safety data sheet (SDS) | External SDS |
- Except where otherwise noted, data are given for materials in their standard state (at 25 °C [77 °F], 100 kPa). Infobox references

Schuetze reagent, also written as Schütze reagent, is made up of iodine pentoxide (I_{2}O_{5}) and sulfuric acid on granular silica gel. It is used to convert carbon monoxide (CO) into carbon dioxide (CO_{2}) at room temperature. This can be used as a method for assaying carbon content in quality control of the production of uranium carbide fuel for nuclear reactors.
