= Tetraiodine nonoxide =

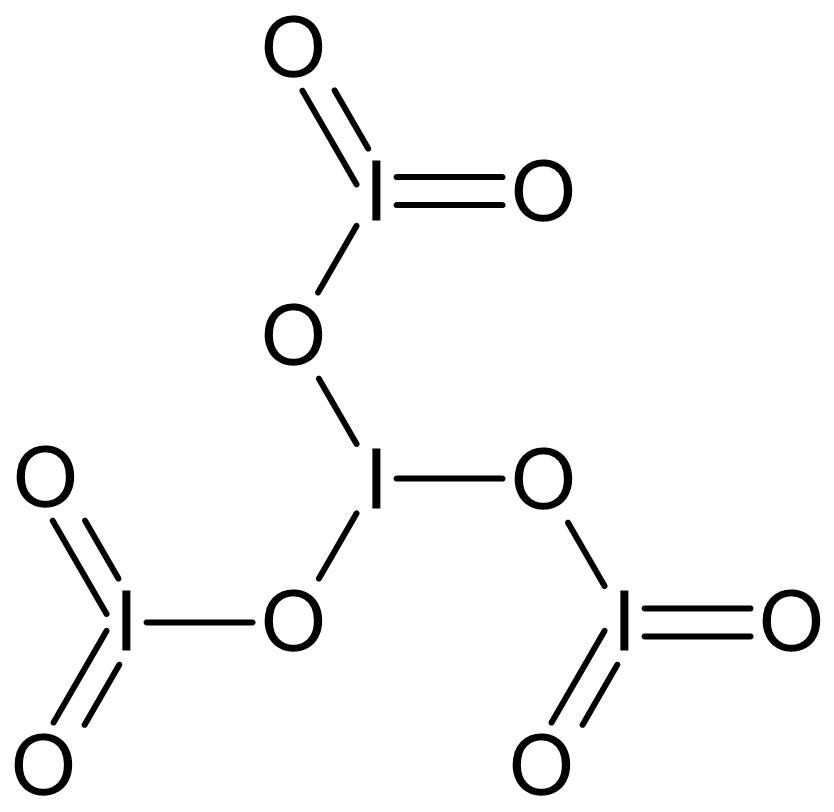

Identifiers
CAS Number	73560-00-6
3D model (JSmol)	Interactive image
- InChI: InChI=1S/I4O9/c5-1(6)11-4(12-2(7)8)13-3(9)10 Key: IQQBBNVVZPXURM-UHFFFAOYSA-N
- SMILES: O=I(=O)OI(OI(=O)=O)OI(=O)=O

Properties
Chemical formula	I_{4}O_{9}
Molar mass	651.609 g·mol^{−1}
Appearance	light yellow solid
Melting point	75 °C (decomposes)
Solubility in water	reacts
- Except where otherwise noted, data are given for materials in their standard state (at 25 °C [77 °F], 100 kPa). Infobox references

Tetraiodine nonoxide is an iodine oxide with the chemical formula I_{4}O_{9}.

== Preparation ==
Tetraiodine nonoxide can be produced by reacting ozone and iodine in carbon tetrachloride at −78 °C:

2 I_{2} + 9 O_{3} → I_{4}O_{9} + 9 O_{2}

It can also be produced by heating iodic acid and phosphoric acid together:

8 HIO_{3} → 2 I_{4}O_{9} + 4 H_{2}O + O_{2}

== Properties ==
Tetraiodine nonoxide is a light yellow solid that can easily hydrolyze. It decomposes above 75 °C:

4 I_{4}O_{9} → 6 I_{2}O_{5} + 2 I_{2} + 3 O_{2}

Like diiodine tetroxide, tetraiodine nonoxide contains both I(III) and I(V), and disproportionates to iodate and iodide under alkaline conditions:

3 I_{4}O_{9} + 12 HO^{−} → I^{−} + 11 IO^{−}_{3} + 6 H_{2}O

It reacts with water to form iodic acid and iodine:

5 I_{4}O_{9} + 9 H_{2}O → 18 HIO_{3} + I_{2}
