= Dibromine pentoxide =

Names
- IUPAC name Dibromine pentoxide
- Other names Bromine pentoxide

Identifiers
CAS Number	58572-43-3
3D model (JSmol)	Interactive image
ChemSpider	103875839
PubChem CID	15779615
- InChI: InChI=1S/Br2O5/c3-1(4)7-2(5)6 Key: NWWZVGMDNVSHDB-UHFFFAOYSA-N
- SMILES: O=[Br](=O)O[Br](=O)=O

Properties
Chemical formula	Br_{2}O_{5}
Molar mass	239.805 g/mol
Appearance	colorless solid
Melting point	decomposes around −20°C

Related compounds
Other anions	Bromine dioxide Bromine trifluoride Bromine pentafluoride
Other cations	Oxygen difluoride Dichlorine monoxide Chlorine dioxide Iodine dioxide
- Except where otherwise noted, data are given for materials in their standard state (at 25 °C [77 °F], 100 kPa). (what is ?) Infobox references

Dibromine pentoxide is the chemical compound composed of bromine and oxygen with the formula Br_{2}O_{5}. It is a colorless solid that is stable below −20 °C. It has the structure O_{2}Br−O−BrO_{2}, the Br−O−Br bond is bent with bond angle 121.2°. Each BrO_{3} group is pyramidal with the bromine atom at the apex.

== Preparation ==
Dibromine pentoxide can be prepared by reacting a solution of bromine in dichloromethane with ozone at low temperatures and recrystallized from propionitrile.
