= Bromine dioxide =

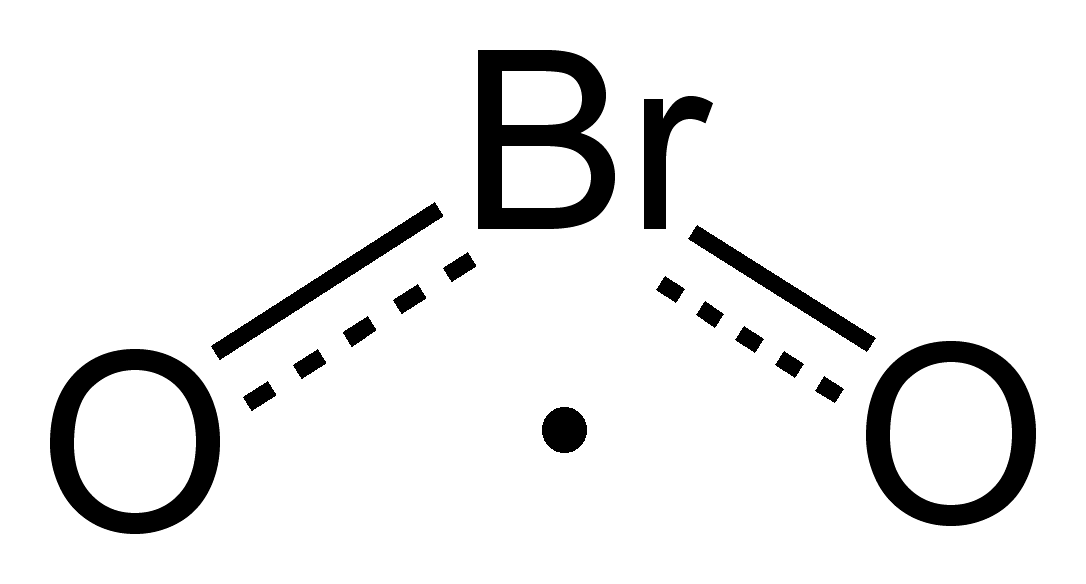

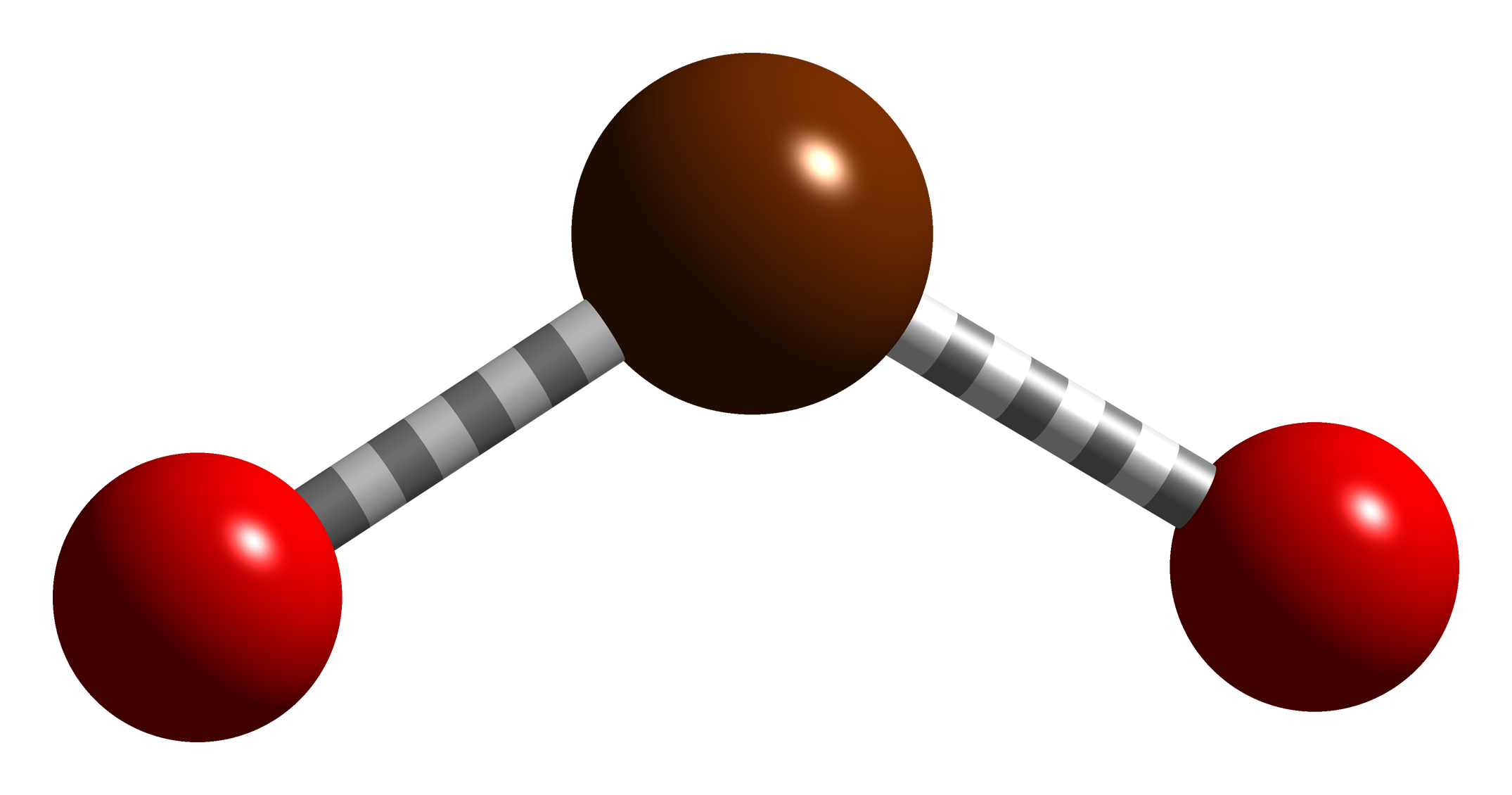

Names
- IUPAC name Bromine dioxide

Identifiers
CAS Number	21255-83-4
3D model (JSmol)	Interactive image
ChemSpider	4574124
PubChem CID	5460629
- InChI: InChI=1S/BrO2/c2-1-3 Key: SISAYUDTHCIGLM-UHFFFAOYSA-N; InChI=1/BrO2/c2-1-3 Key: SISAYUDTHCIGLM-UHFFFAOYAZ
- SMILES: O=Br=O

Properties
Chemical formula	BrO_{2}
Molar mass	111.903 g/mol
Appearance	unstable yellow crystals
Melting point	decomposes around 0°C

Related compounds
Other anions	Bromine monoxide Bromine trifluoride Bromine pentafluoride
Other cations	Oxygen difluoride Dichlorine monoxide Chlorine dioxide Iodine dioxide
- Except where otherwise noted, data are given for materials in their standard state (at 25 °C [77 °F], 100 kPa). verify (what is ?) Infobox references

Bromine dioxide is the chemical compound composed of bromine and oxygen with the formula BrO_{2}. It forms unstable yellow to yellow-orange crystals. It was first isolated by R. Schwarz and M. Schmeißer in 1937 and is hypothesized to be important in the atmospheric reaction of bromine with ozone. It is similar to chlorine dioxide, the dioxide of its halogen neighbor one period higher on the periodic table.

== Reactions ==
Bromine dioxide is formed when an electric current is passed through a mixture of bromine and oxygen gases at low temperature and pressure.

Bromine dioxide can also be formed by the treatment of bromine gas with ozone in trichlorofluoromethane at −50 °C.

When mixed with a base, bromine dioxide gives the bromide and bromate anions:

6 BrO_{2} + 6 NaOH → NaBr + 5 NaBrO_{3} + 3 H_{2}O
