= Iodine sulfate =

Names
- Other names Iodine(III) sulfate

Identifiers
3D model (JSmol)	Interactive image
- InChI: InChI=1S/2H4I.3H2O4S/c;;3*1-5(2,3)4/h2*1H4;3*(H2,1,2,3,4)/q2*+3;;;/p-6 Key: PRMTVTMSZQVGDM-UHFFFAOYSA-H
- SMILES: [I+3].[I+3].[O-]S(=O)(=O)[O-].[O-]S(=O)(=O)[O-].[O-]S(=O)(=O)[O-]

Properties
Chemical formula	I_{2}(SO_{4})_{3}
Appearance	Light yellow crystals
- Except where otherwise noted, data are given for materials in their standard state (at 25 °C [77 °F], 100 kPa). Infobox references

Iodine sulfate is an inorganic compound with the formula I_{2}(SO_{4})_{3}. It appears as light yellow crystals and reacts with water.

== Synthesis ==
Reaction of diiodosyl sulfate and sulfur trioxide:

(IO)_{2}SO_{4} + 2 SO_{3} → I_{2}(SO_{4})_{3}

Iodine sulfate is also produced when elemental I_{2} , I_{2}O_{5} and SO_{3} react.

== Physical properties ==
Iodine sulfate forms light yellow hygroscopic crystals.

== Chemical properties ==
Iodine sulfate is soluble in organic liquids and stable in anhydrous and strongly acidic solvents. In a humid environment, it darkens due to decomposition that releases molecular iodine.
