= Iodine dioxide =

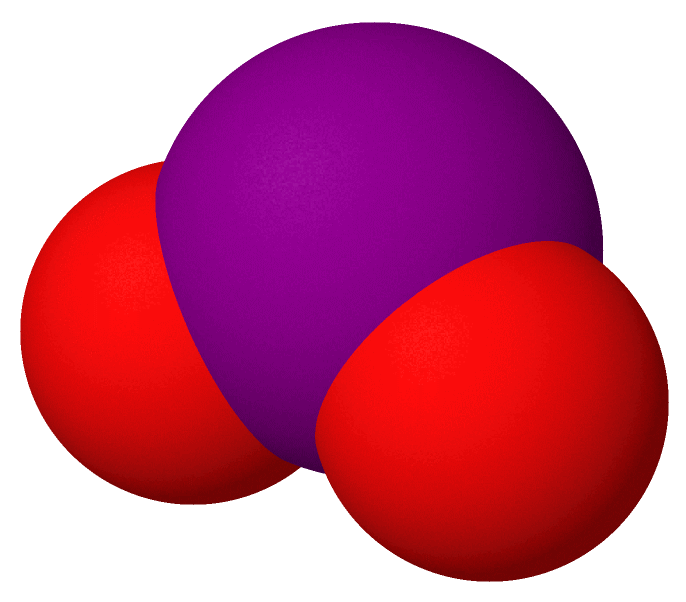

Names
- Other names dioxidoiodide, iodyl, iodoxy radical, iodine peroxide, iodine superoxide

Identifiers
CAS Number	13494-92-3
3D model (JSmol)	Interactive image
ChEBI	CHEBI:29901
ChemSpider	4574133
Gmelin Reference	404604
PubChem CID	5460638
- InChI: InChI=1S/IO2/c2-1-3 Key: WXDJHDMIIZKXSK-UHFFFAOYSA-N
- SMILES: O=I[O]

Properties
Chemical formula	IO_{2}
Molar mass	158.902 g·mol^{−1}
Appearance	yellow solid
Density	4.2 g/cm^{3}
Melting point	130 °C (266 °F; 403 K)
Solubility in water	reacts with water
- Except where otherwise noted, data are given for materials in their standard state (at 25 °C [77 °F], 100 kPa). Infobox references

Iodine dioxide is a binary inorganic compound of iodine and oxygen with the chemical formula IO_{2}. Only stable as a dilute gas, this compound is one of many iodine oxides, and "iodine dioxide" is sometimes used to describe its formal dimer, the salt diiodine tetroxide (I_{2}O_{4}, [IO]^{+}[IO_{3}]^{−}).

It is formed, in parts-per-trillion quantities, at the marine boundary layer and believed to mediate particulate nucleation therein. Atomic iodine, originally from photolysis of algaeic diiodomethane, reacts with ozone to produce iodine monoxide, which then disproportionates to atomic iodine and iodine dioxide. At a sufficiently large concentration, the particles then combine to form small grains of diiodine tetroxide.
