= Iodine oxide =

Class of chemical compounds

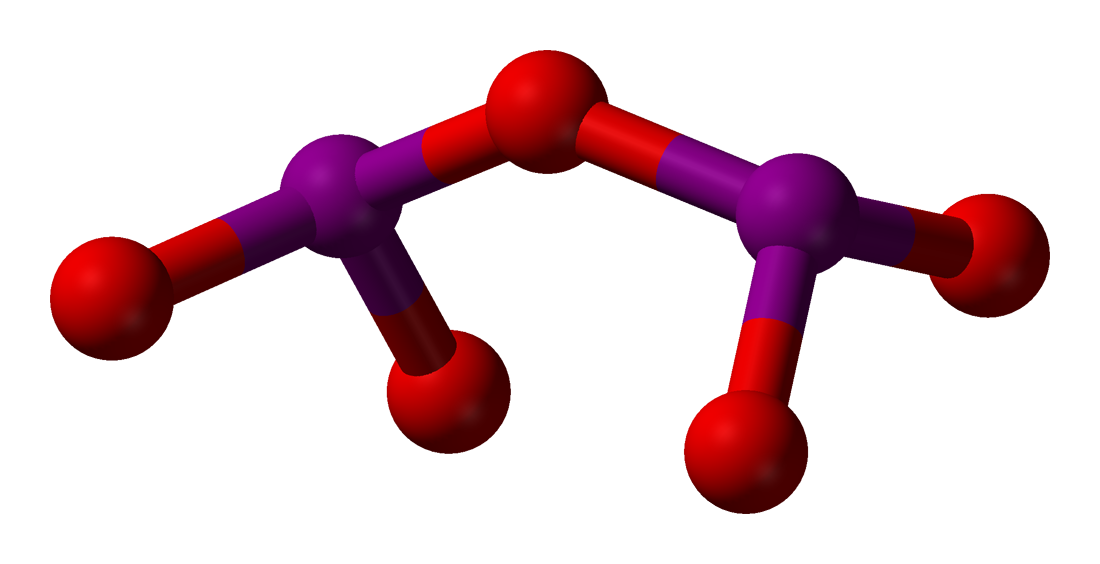
Iodine pentoxide (I_{2}O_{5})

Iodine oxides are chemical compounds of oxygen and iodine. Iodine has two well-established bulk-isolable stable oxides: iodine pentoxide (I_{2}O_{5}) and diiodine tetroxide (I_{2}O_{4}). A third oxide, diiodine hexaoxide (I_{2}O_{6}) has been reported but is not generally accepted as a well-established stable bulk oxide. Several other oxides have been formed in trace quantities or hypothesized to exist. The most significant of the stable oxides is iodine pentoxide, which is the most thermodynamically and kinetically stable of all halogen oxides.

The chemistry of these compounds is complicated, with only a few having been well characterized. Many have been detected in the atmosphere and are believed to be particularly important in the marine boundary layer.

== Molecular compounds ==
Iodine oxides
Molecular formula	I_{2}O	IO	IO_{2}	I_{2}O_{4}	I_{4}O_{9}	I_{2}O_{5}	I_{2}O_{6}	I_{2}O_{7}
Name	Diiodine oxide	Iodine monoxide	Iodine dioxide	Diiodine tetroxide (Iodine tetroxide)	Tetraiodine nonoxide	Iodine pentoxide (Diiodine pentoxide)	Diiodine hexaoxide	Diiodine heptoxide
Structure	I_{2}O	IO	IO_{2}	O_{2}IOIO	I(OIO_{2})_{3}	O(IO_{2})_{2}	(I_{4}O_{12})_{n}	polymeric
Molecular model								
CAS registry	39319-71-6	14696-98-1	13494-92-3	1024652-24-1	66523-94-2	12029-98-0	65355-99-9	
Appearance	red solutions in CH_{2}Cl_{2}		dilute gas; condenses to I_{2}O_{4}	yellow solid	dark yellow solid	white crystalline solid	yellow solid	unstable yellow solid
Oxidation state	+1	+2	+4	+3 and +5	+3 and +5	+5	+5 and +7	+7
Melting point	not isolable	not isolable	not isolable	decomp. 100 °C	decomp. 75 °C	decomp. 300–350 °C	decomp. 179–197 °C	decomp. <60 °C
Solubility in water				decomp. to HIO_{3} + I_{2}	decomp. to HIO_{3} + I_{2}	187 g/100 mL (hydrolyzes into HIO_{3})		

Diiodine monoxide has largely been the subject of theoretical study, but there is some evidence that it may be prepared in a similar manner to dichlorine monoxide, via a reaction between HgO and I_{2}. The compound appears to be highly unstable but can react with alkenes to give halogenated products.

As of 2019, diiodine monoxide has finally been synthesized by comproportionation of suspensions of HIO_{3} and elemental iodine in concentrated sulfuric acid. The compound was extracted using dichloromethane and its presence was confirmed by spectroscopy.

Radical iodine oxide (IO) and iodine dioxide (IO_{2}), collectively referred to as IO_{x}, and also iodine tetroxide (I_{2}O_{4}) all possess significant and interconnected atmospheric chemistry. They are formed, in very small quantities, in the marine boundary layer by the photochemical reaction of ozone with diiodomethane, produced by macroalga such as seaweed, or through the oxidation of molecular iodine, produced by the reaction of gaseous ozone and iodide present at the seasurface. Despite the small quantities produced (typically below ppt) they are thought to be powerful ozone depletion agents.

Diiodine pentoxide (I_{2}O_{5}) is the anhydride of iodic acid and the only stable anhydride of all the halogen oxoacids. Unlike other halogen oxides, it can be synthesized by thermal dehydration of iodic acid and is highly resilient to thermal decomposition. Iodine pentoxide adopts multiple polymorphs that can be synthesized by varying pressures.

Tetraiodine nonoxide (I_{4}O_{9}) has been prepared by the gas-phase reaction of I_{2} with O_{3} but has not been extensively studied.

Diiodine hexaoxide (I_{2}O_{6}), also known as iodine trioxide or diiodine(V,VII) oxide, is a hygroscopic yellow solid. It has been isolated in bulk and has been studied as a mix with aluminium for destroying chemical and biological agents. It can be synthesized in hot concentrated sulfuric acid, starting either with pure H_{5}IO_{6} or a mix of H_{5}IO_{6} and HIO_{3} It adopts a polymeric structure consisting of I^{V} and I^{VII} centers.

Diiodine heptoxide (I_{2}O_{7}) has been reported as a yellow solid that slowly decomposes into oxygen at room temperature with rapid decomposition beginning at 60 °C, converting it into I_{2}O_{6}.

== Iodate anions ==
Iodine oxides also form negatively charged anions, which (associated with complementary cations) are components of acids or salts. These include the iodates and periodates, which can form multinuclear structures such as [I_{2}O_{9}]^{4-}.

The conjugate acids of the iodine oxides are:

Iodine oxidation state	+1	+3	+5	+7
Name	Hypoiodous acid	Iodous acid	Iodic acid	Periodic acid
Formula	HIO	HIO_{2}	HIO_{3}	HIO_{4} or H_{5}IO_{6}

The periodates include two main variants: metaperiodate IO^{−}_{4} and orthoperiodate IO^{5−}_{6}.

== See also ==
- Oxygen fluoride
- Chlorine oxide
- Bromine oxide
