= Iodine monoxide =

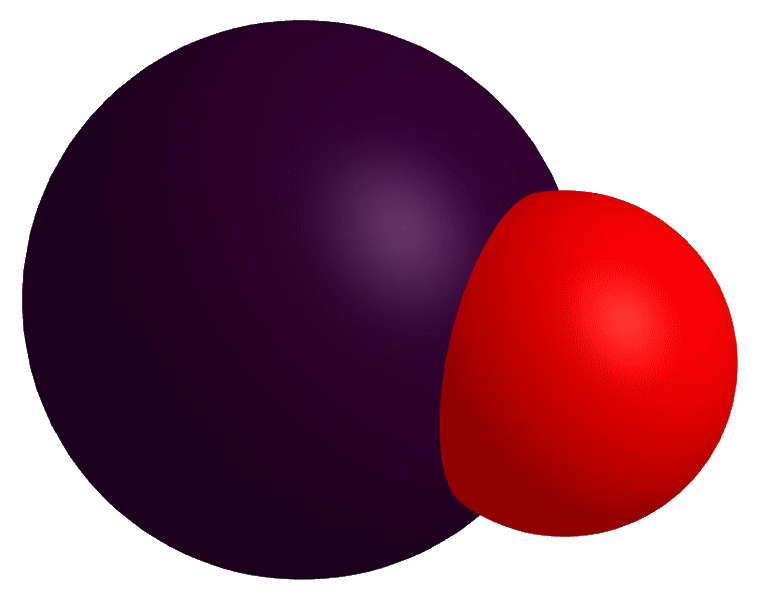

Names
- Other names Iodine(II) oxide, iodosyl, oxidoiodine

Identifiers
CAS Number	14696-98-1
3D model (JSmol)	Interactive image
ChEBI	CHEBI:29896
ChemSpider	4574060
Gmelin Reference	1170
PubChem CID	5460557
CompTox Dashboard (EPA)	101316449
- InChI: InChI=1S/IO/c1-2 Key: AFSVSXMRDKPOEW-UHFFFAOYSA-N
- SMILES: [O]I

Properties
Chemical formula	IO
Molar mass	142.903 g·mol^{−1}
Appearance	purple gas
- Except where otherwise noted, data are given for materials in their standard state (at 25 °C [77 °F], 100 kPa). Infobox references

Iodine monoxide is a binary inorganic compound of iodine and oxygen with the chemical formula IO•. A free radical, this compound is the simplest of many iodine oxides. It is similar to the oxygen monofluoride, chlorine monoxide and bromine monoxide radicals.

== Synthesis ==
Iodine monoxide can be obtained by the reaction between iodine and oxygen:

I_{2} + O_{2} → 2 IO

== Chemical properties ==
Iodine monoxide decomposes to its prime elements:

2 IO → I_{2} + O_{2}

Iodine monoxide reacts with nitric oxide:

2 IO + 2 NO → I_{2} + 2 NO_{2}

== Atmosphere ==
Atmospheric iodine atoms (e.g. from iodomethane) can react with ozone to produce the iodine monoxide radical:

I_{2} + 2 O_{3} → 2 IO + 2 O_{2}

This process can contribute to ozone depletion.
