= Bromine monoxide radical =

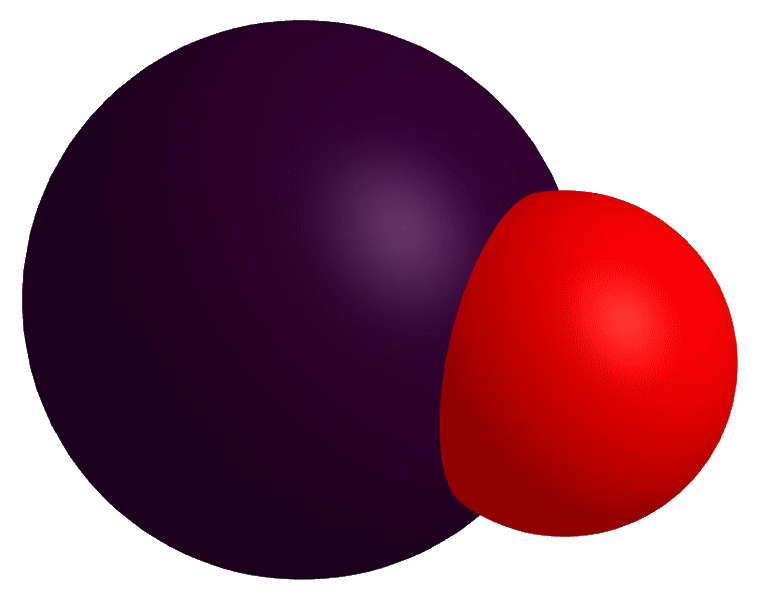

Names
- Other names BrO radical, bromine monoxide, bromine(II) oxide

Identifiers
CAS Number	15656-19-6
3D model (JSmol)	Interactive image
ChEBI	CHEBI:29876
ChemSpider	4574122
Gmelin Reference	1037
PubChem CID	5460627
CompTox Dashboard (EPA)	DTXSID201315575
- InChI: InChI=1S/BrO/c1-2 Key: FMSOWMGJJIHFTQ-UHFFFAOYSA-N
- SMILES: Br[O]

Properties
Chemical formula	BrO
Molar mass	95.903 g·mol^{−1}
- Except where otherwise noted, data are given for materials in their standard state (at 25 °C [77 °F], 100 kPa). Infobox references

Bromine monoxide is a binary inorganic compound of bromine and oxygen with the chemical formula BrO. A free radical, this compound is the simplest of many bromine oxides. The compound is capable of influencing atmospheric chemical processes. Naturally, BrO can be found in volcanic plumes. BrO is similar to the oxygen monofluoride, chlorine monoxide and iodine monoxide radicals.

== Chemical properties ==
The compound is very effective as a catalyst of the ozone destruction. The chemical reaction of BrO and chlorine dioxide (OClO) results in ozone depletion in the stratosphere.
