= Diiodine tetroxide =

Names
- IUPAC name iodosyl iodate

Identifiers
CAS Number	1024652-24-1
3D model (JSmol)	Interactive image
PubChem CID	54579881
- InChI: InChI=1S/I2O4/c3-1-6-2(4)5 Key: XHTWXUOEQMOFEJ-UHFFFAOYSA-N
- SMILES: O=IOI(=O)=O

Properties
Chemical formula	I_{2}O_{4}
Molar mass	317.805 g·mol^{−1}
Density	2.57
- Except where otherwise noted, data are given for materials in their standard state (at 25 °C [77 °F], 100 kPa). Infobox references

Diiodine tetraoxide, I_{2}O_{4}, is a chemical compound of oxygen and iodine. It belongs to the class of iodine oxides, and is a mixed oxide, consisting of iodine(III) and iodine(V) oxidation states.

== Synthesis ==
The oxide is formed by the reaction of hot concentrated sulfuric acid on iodic acid for several days.

3HIO_{3} → I_{2}O_{4} + HIO_{4} + H_{2}O

It is formed from diiodine pentoxide and iodine in concentrated sulfuric acid or iodosyl sulfate (IO)_{2}SO_{4} added to water:

4(IO)_{2}SO_{4} + 4H_{2}O → 3I_{2}O_{4} + I_{2} + 4H_{2}SO_{4}

Alternatively, excess of concentrated nitric acid oxidizes dry iodine to this salt.

== Physical properties ==
Diiodine tetraoxide is a yellow, granular powder. At temperatures above 85 °C it decomposes to diiodine pentoxide and iodine:

5I_{2}O_{4} → 4I_{2}O_{5} + I_{2}

This process is even faster at 135 °C. It dissolves in hot water to form iodate and iodide. Structurally, the compound is iodyl iodite O_{2}I-OIO (iodine(V,III) oxide) with bent I^{V}O_{2} units (I–O distances 1.80 and 1.85 Å; ∠OIO angle 97°) and bent I^{III}O_{2} units (IO distances 1.93 Å, OIO angle 95.8°). The structure is a polymeric zigzag chain of I–O–I-O–... alternating as I^{V}O_{2} and I^{III}.

Diiodine tetraoxide has a monoclinic crystal structure with the space group P2_{1}/c (space group number 14). Unit cell dimensions are a = 8.483 b = 6.696 c = 8.333 Å and β = 124.69°. Unit cell volume = 389.15 Å^{3}. Z = 4. Density is 2.57 Mg/m^{3}

== Reactions ==
Diiodine tetroxide oxidises hydrochloric acid:

I_{2}O_{4} + 8H^{+} + 8Cl^{−} → 2ICl + 4H_{2}O + 3Cl_{2}

It decomposes in water.
