= Diiodosyl sulfate =

Inorganic compound

Names
- Other names Iodosyl sulfate

Identifiers
CAS Number	25041-70-7
3D model (JSmol)	Interactive image
- InChI: InChI=1S/2IO.H2O4S/c2*1-2;1-5(2,3)4/h;;(H2,1,2,3,4)/q2*+1;/p-2 Key: TUEQLCFZSMGCTF-UHFFFAOYSA-L
- SMILES: [I+]=O.[I+]=O.[O-]S([O-])(=O)=O

Properties
Chemical formula	(IO)_{2}SO_{4}
Molar mass	381.87 g/mol
- Except where otherwise noted, data are given for materials in their standard state (at 25 °C [77 °F], 100 kPa). Infobox references

Diiodosyl sulfate is an inorganic compound, a basic salt of iodine and sulfuric acid with the formula (IO)_{2}SO_{4}. It forms yellow crystals.

== Synthesis ==
Reaction of iodic and sulfuric acids :

2 HIO_{3} + H_{2}SO_{4} → (IO)_{2}SO_{4} + O_{2} + 2 H_{2}O

Passing ozonized oxygen through a solution of iodine in sulfuric acid:

I_{2} + 3 O_{3} + H_{2}SO_{4} → (IO)_{2}SO_{4} + 3 O_{2} + H_{2}O

== Physical properties ==
Diiodosyl sulfate forms yellow hygroscopic crystals and is poorly soluble in cold water.

It dissolves in and can be recrystallized from concentrated sulfuric acid.

== Chemical properties ==
Under the influence of atmospheric moisture, diiodosyl sulfate hydrolyzes with the release of iodine, iodic and sulfuric acids.

It decomposes when heated:

4(IO) _{2} SO _{4} → 2I_{2}O_{5} + 2I_{2} + 4SO_{3} + O_{2}

It reacts with sulfur trioxide:

(IO)_{2}SO_{4} + 2SO_{3} → I_{2}(SO_{4})_{3}

With concentrated sulfuric acid, it forms an acidic salt:

(IO)_{2}SO_{4} + H_{2}SO_{4} → 2 IOHSO_{4}
