= Iodine pentoxide =

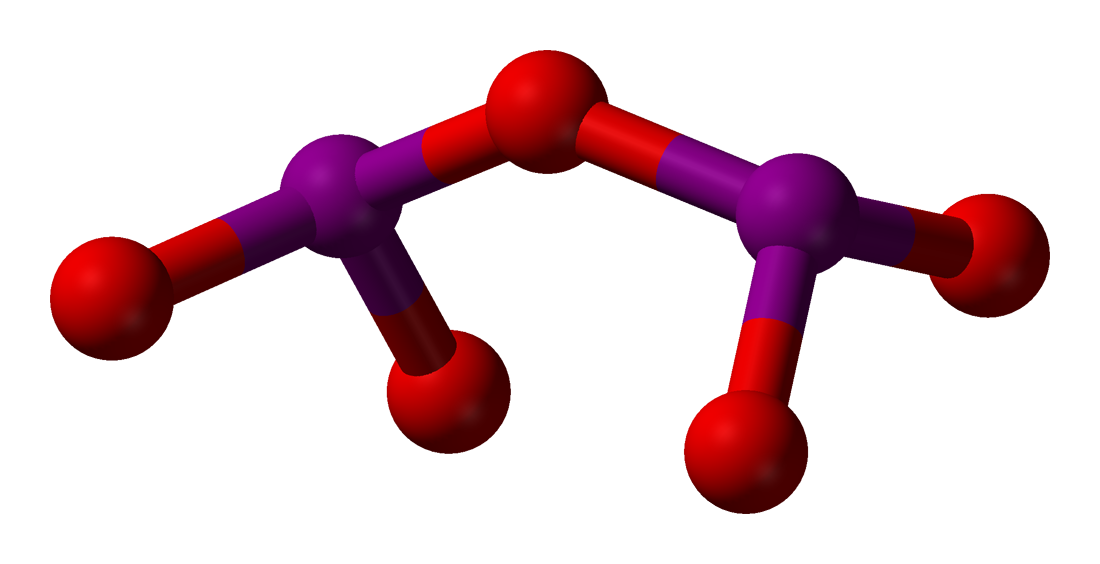

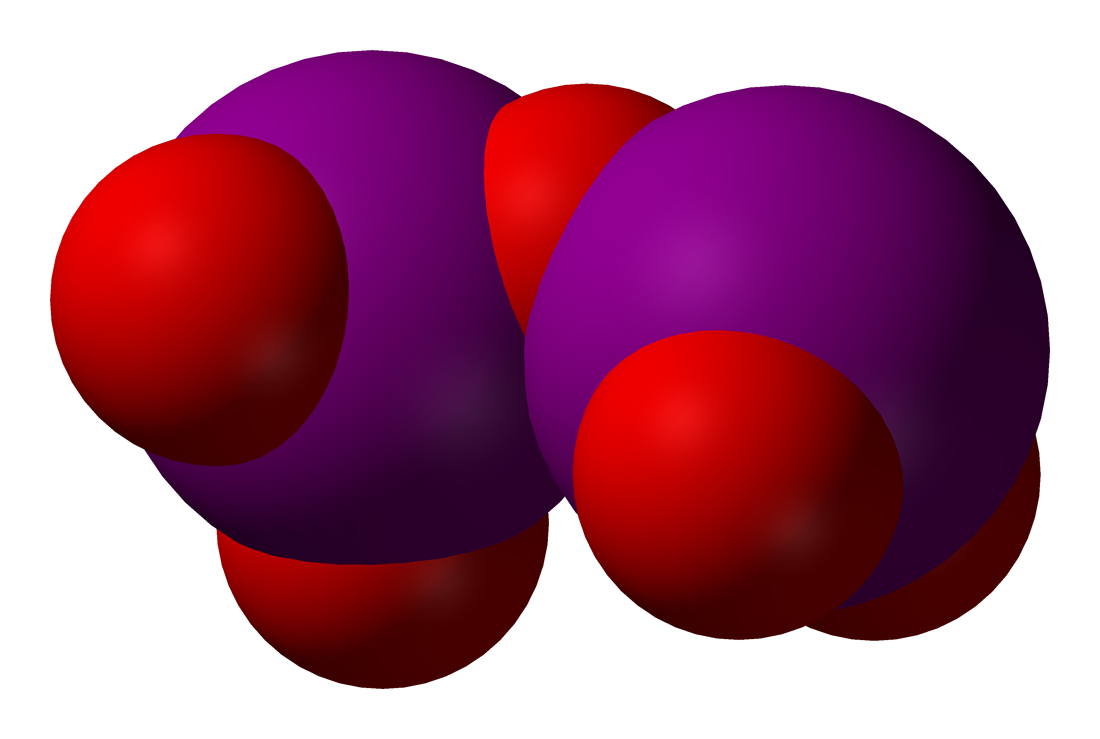

Names
- IUPAC name Iodine pentoxide
- Other names Iodine(V) oxide Iodic anhydride

Identifiers
CAS Number	12029-98-0
3D model (JSmol)	Interactive image
ChEBI	CHEBI:29914
ChemSpider	140179
ECHA InfoCard	100.031.569
PubChem CID	159402
UNII	UPU35C0Q0N
CompTox Dashboard (EPA)	DTXSID40923305
- InChI: InChI=1S/I2O5/c3-1(4)7-2(5)6 Key: BIZCJSDBWZTASZ-UHFFFAOYSA-N; InChI=1/I2O5/c3-1(4)7-2(5)6 Key: BIZCJSDBWZTASZ-UHFFFAOYAR
- SMILES: O=I(=O)OI(=O)=O

Properties
Chemical formula	I_{2}O_{5}
Molar mass	333.804 g·mol^{−1}
Appearance	white crystalline solid hygroscopic
Density	4.980 g/cm^{3}
Melting point	300 °C (572 °F; 573 K) (decomposes)
Solubility	soluble in water and nitric acid; insoluble in ethanol, ether and CS_{2}
Magnetic susceptibility (χ)	−79.4·10^{−6} cm^{3}/mol

Thermochemistry
Std enthalpy of formation (Δ_{f}H^{⦵}_{298})	−173.0 kJ/mol

Hazards
- Occupational safety and health (OHS/OSH)
Main hazards	oxidizer
NFPA 704 (fire diamond)	3 0 0 OX

Related compounds
Other anions	iodine pentafluoride
- Except where otherwise noted, data are given for materials in their standard state (at 25 °C [77 °F], 100 kPa). verify (what is ?) Infobox references

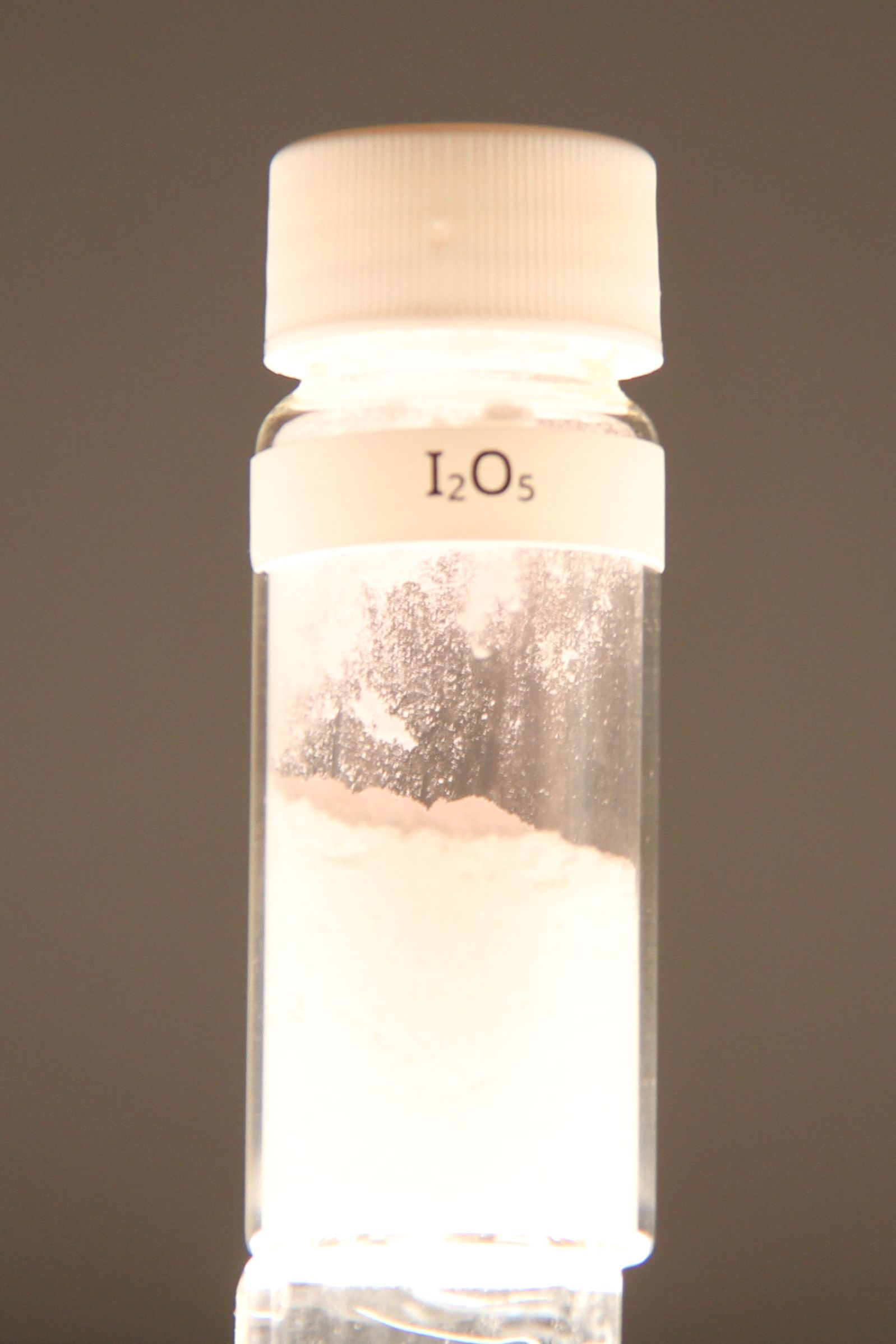
Fresh iodine pentoxide

Iodine pentoxide is the chemical compound with the formula I_{2}O_{5}. This iodine oxide is the anhydride of iodic acid, and one of the few iodine oxides that is stable. It is produced by dehydrating iodic acid at 200 °C in a stream of dry air:

2HIO_{3} → I_{2}O_{5} + H_{2}O

This dehydration proceeds through the hydrogen bonded adduct I_{2}O_{5}·HIO_{3} (HI_{3}O_{8}), which is present in commercial "HIO_{3}."

3 HIO_{3} → HI_{3}O_{8} + H_{2}O

== Structure ==
I_{2}O_{5} is bent with an I–O–I angle of 139.2°, but the molecule has no mirror plane so its symmetry is C_{2} rather than C_{2v}. The terminal I–O distances are around 1.80 Å and the bridging I–O distances are around 1.95 Å.

== Reactions ==
Iodine pentoxide easily oxidises carbon monoxide to carbon dioxide at room temperature:

5 CO + I_{2}O_{5} → I_{2} + 5 CO_{2}

This reaction can be used to analyze the concentration of CO in a gaseous sample.

I_{2}O_{5} forms iodyl salts, containing [IO_{2}^{+}], when reacted with SO_{3} and S_{2}O_{6}F_{2}. When heated with concentrated sulfuric acid, it forms iodosyl salts, containing [IO^{+}].

Iodine pentoxide decomposes to iodine (vapor) and oxygen when heated to about 350 °C.
