= Streng =

- Pronunciation: IPA: [ʃtʀɛŋ]

Origin
- Languages: German, Dutch
- Meaning: German: strict, severe; Dutch: (additionally) rope maker
- Region of origin: Central Europe

Other names
- See also: Stearns, Stearn, Sterne (surname), Stern (surname)

Streng (from German: streng "strict", "severe", "rigid") is a German surname belonging to the group of family names based on a personal characteristic, in this case derived from a nickname originally used for a strong or tough person. As a Dutch surname it may also be an occupational family name for a "rope maker" (from Dutch: streng "string", "rope", "cord"). Notable people with the name include:

- Ernst Streng (1942–1993), German cyclist
- Felix Streng (born 1995), German Paralympic track and field athlete
- Håkan Streng (born 1947), Finnish troubadour and poet
- Lucia V. Streng (c. 1910–1995), Russian-born chemist
- Marco Streng (born 1989), German businessman
- Pekka Streng (1948–1975), Finnish musician
