= Pentaoxygen difluoride =

Identifiers
CAS Number	12191-79-6
3D model (JSmol)	Interactive image
- InChI: InChI=1S/F2O5/c1-3-5-7-6-4-2 Key: YDWQUFUNVRYGQP-UHFFFAOYSA-N
- SMILES: FOOOOOF

Properties
Chemical formula	F_{2}O_{5}
Molar mass	117.992 g·mol^{−1}
Appearance	reddish-brown liquid at 90 K
- Except where otherwise noted, data are given for materials in their standard state (at 25 °C [77 °F], 100 kPa). Infobox references

Pentaoxygen difluoride is a binary inorganic compound of fluorine and oxygen with the chemical formula O_{5}F_{2}. The compound is one of many known oxygen fluorides.

== Synthesis ==
The compound can be prepared by electric discharges through the F_{2}—O_{2} mixture of the certain molar ratio at 60 to 77 K. The ratio is predicted to be 5:2.

== Physical properties ==
Pentaoxygen difluoride is an oxidizing agent. At 90 K, the compound looks like a reddish-brown liquid and as an oil at 77 K.

At 77 K, the compound is insoluble in liquid N_{2}, soluble in liquid O_{2} and CH_{4}. At 65 K, it is soluble in liquid OF_{2}.
