= Tetraoxygen difluoride =

Names
- Other names Difluorotetraoxidane

Identifiers
CAS Number	107782-11-6
3D model (JSmol)	Interactive image
PubChem CID	163187768
- InChI: InChI=1S/F2O4/c1-3-5-6-4-2 Key: GFNATQMVAVFBGQ-UHFFFAOYSA-N
- SMILES: FOOOOF

Properties
Chemical formula	O_{4}F_{2}
Molar mass	101.993 g·mol^{−1}
Appearance	red-brown solid (at < −191 °C)
Melting point	−191 °C (−311.8 °F; 82.1 K)
- Except where otherwise noted, data are given for materials in their standard state (at 25 °C [77 °F], 100 kPa). Infobox references

Tetraoxygen difluoride is an inorganic chemical compound of oxygen, belonging to the family of oxygen fluorides. It consists of two O_{2}F units bound together with a weak O-O bond, and is the dimer of the O_{2}F radical.

== Preparation ==
Tetraoxygen difluoride can be prepared in two steps. In the first step, a photochemically generated fluorine atom reacts with oxygen to form the dioxygen fluoride radical.

2 O_{2} + 2 F^{•} → 2 [O_{2}F]^{•}

This radical subsequently undergoes dimerization, entering an equilibrium with tetraoxygen difluoride at temperatures under −175 °C:

2 [O_{2}F]^{•} ⇌ O_{4}F_{2}

At the same time, the dioxygen fluoride radicals decompose into dioxygen difluoride and oxygen gas, which shifts the above equilibrium with O_{4}F_{2} to the left.

2 [O_{2}F]^{•} → O_{2} + O_{2}F_{2}

== Properties ==
Tetraoxygen difluoride is dark red-brown as a solid and has a melting point around −191 °C.

It is a strong fluorinating and oxidizing agent, even stronger than dioxygen difluoride, so that it can, for example, oxidize Ag(II) to Ag(III) or Au(III) to Au(V). This process creates the corresponding anions AgF^{-}_{4} and AuF^{-}_{6}. With non-noble substances this oxidation can lead to explosions even at low temperatures. As an example, elemental sulfur reacts explosively to form sulfur hexafluoride even at −180 °C.

Similar to [O_{2}F]^{•} or O_{2}F_{2}, tetraoxygen difluoride tends to form salts with the dioxygenyl cation O^{+}_{2} when it reacts with fluoride acceptors such as boron trifluoride (BF_{3}). In the case of BF_{3}, this leads to the formation of O_{2}^{+}•BF_{4}^{−}:

O_{4}F_{2} + 2BF_{3} → 2O_{2}^{+}BF_{4}^{−}

Similarly, for arsenic pentafluoride it reacts to create O_{2}^{+}AsF_{6}^{−}.
