= Dioxygen monofluoride =

Names
- Other names: (Fluoroperoxy)radical; Fluoroperoxyl; Fluorine superoxide; Fluorodioxidanyl

Identifiers
CAS Number	15499-23-7
3D model (JSmol)	Interactive image
ChemSpider	123417
PubChem CID	139943
CompTox Dashboard (EPA)	DTXSID50165779
- InChI: InChI=1S/FO2/c1-3-2 Key: GQRAHKRZRKCZPQ-UHFFFAOYSA-N
- SMILES: [O]OF

Properties
Chemical formula	FO_{2}
Molar mass	50.996 g·mol^{−1}
- Except where otherwise noted, data are given for materials in their standard state (at 25 °C [77 °F], 100 kPa). Infobox references

Dioxygen monofluoride is a binary inorganic compound radical of fluorine and oxygen with the chemical formula O_{2}F. The compound is stable only at low temperature. This is one of many known oxygen fluorides.

== Synthesis ==
- Thermal decomposition of dioxygen difluoride:

O_{2}F_{2} → F + O_{2}F
F + F → F_{2}

- Photolysis of F_{2} and O_{2} dilute in argon:

F_{2} → 2F
F + O_{2} → O_{2}F

== Physical properties ==
Dioxygen monofluoride is a strong oxidizing agent, can be prepared in the coaxial reactor.
