= Oxygen monofluoride =

Names
- Other names Fluorine oxide, fluorooxy radical, fluorooxidanyl

Identifiers
CAS Number	12061-70-0
3D model (JSmol)	Interactive image
ChEBI	CHEBI:30242
ChemSpider	4937269
Gmelin Reference	535
PubChem CID	6432002
CompTox Dashboard (EPA)	DTXSID301315297
- InChI: InChI=1S/FO/c1-2 Key: FXOFAYKVTOLJTJ-UHFFFAOYSA-N
- SMILES: [O]F

Properties
Chemical formula	OF
Molar mass	35.00 g/mol
- Except where otherwise noted, data are given for materials in their standard state (at 25 °C [77 °F], 100 kPa). Infobox references

Oxygen monofluoride is an unstable binary inorganic compound radical of fluorine and oxygen with the chemical formula OF. This is the simplest of many oxygen fluorides.

== Synthesis ==
OF is a radical that can be formed by thermal or photolytic decomposition of OF_{2}

OF_{2} → OF + F

or a reaction of fluorine and ozone:

F + O_{3} → OF + O_{2}

== Atmosphere ==
Oxygen- and fluorine-containing radicals like OF and O_{2}F occur in the atmosphere. These and other halogen radicals have been implicated in the destruction of ozone in the atmosphere.

O_{3} + F → O_{2} + OF
O + OF → O_{2} + F

However, oxygen monofluoride radicals are assumed to not play as big a role in the ozone depletion because free fluorine atoms in the atmosphere are believed to react with methane to produce hydrogen fluoride, which precipitates in rain as hydrofluoric acid.
