= Oxygen fluoride =

Any binary compound of oxygen and fluorine

Oxygen difluoride

Oxygen fluorides are compounds of elements oxygen and fluorine with the general formula O_{n}F_{2}, where n = 1 to 6. Many different oxygen fluorides are known:

- Oxygen monofluoride (OF)
- Oxygen difluoride (OF_{2})
- Dioxygen difluoride (O_{2}F_{2})
- Trioxygen difluoride or ozone difluoride (O_{3}F_{2})
- Tetraoxygen difluoride (O_{4}F_{2})
- Pentaoxygen difluoride (O_{5}F_{2})
- Hexaoxygen difluoride (O_{6}F_{2})
- Dioxygen monofluoride or fluoroperoxyl (O_{2}F)

Tetraoxygen difluoride

Oxygen fluorides are strong oxidizing agents with high energy and can release their energy either instantaneously or at a controlled rate. Thus, these compounds attracted much attention as potential oxidizers in jet propulsion systems.

== Synthesis, properties and reactions ==
=== Oxygen difluoride (OF_{2}) ===
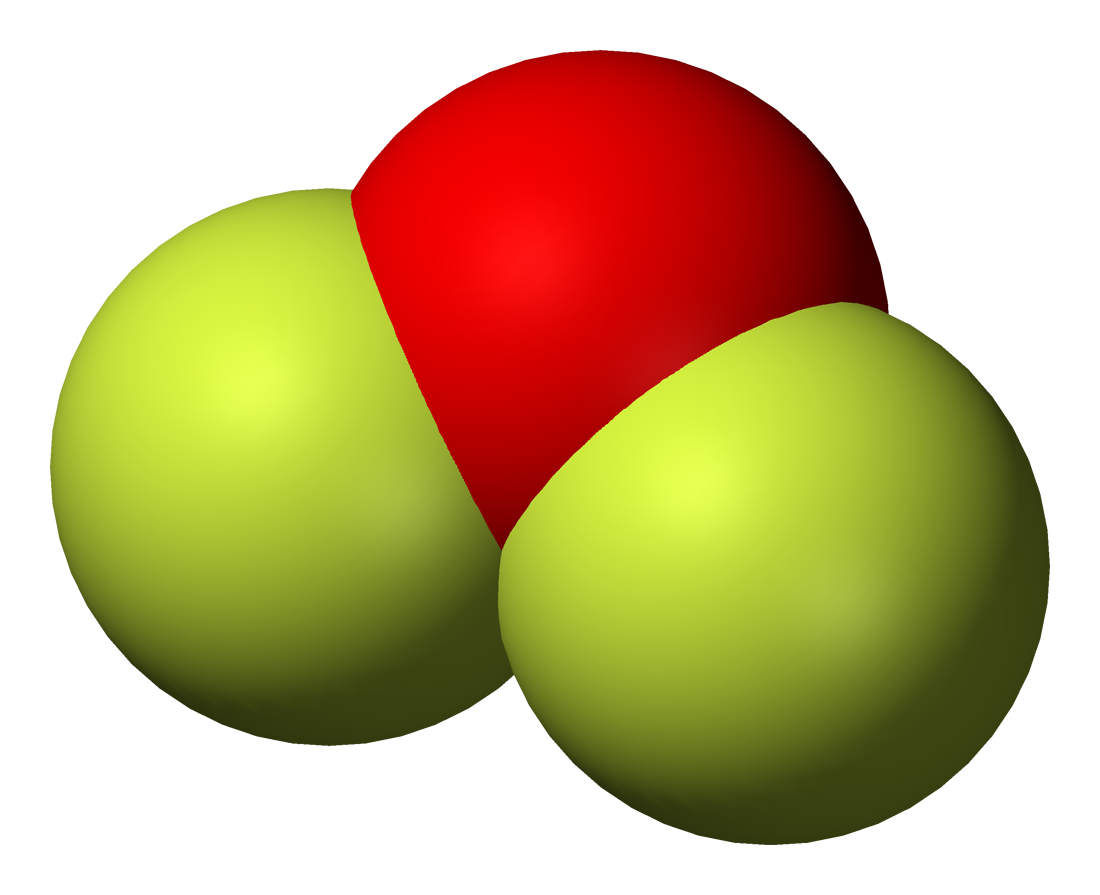
Oxygen difluoride

A common preparative method involves fluorination of sodium hydroxide:

2 F_{2} + 2 NaOH → OF_{2} + 2 NaF + H_{2}O

OF_{2} is a colorless gas at room temperature and a yellow liquid below 128 K. Oxygen difluoride has an irritating odor and is poisonous. It reacts quantitatively with aqueous haloacids to give free halogens:

OF_{2} + 4 HCl → 2 Cl_{2} + 2 HF + 2 H_{2}O

It can also displace halogens from their salts. It is both an effective fluorinating agent and a strong oxidizing agent. When reacted with unsaturated nitrogen fluorides with electrical discharge, it results in the formation of nitrogen trifluoride, oxide fluorides and other oxides.

=== Dioxygen difluoride (O_{2}F_{2}) ===
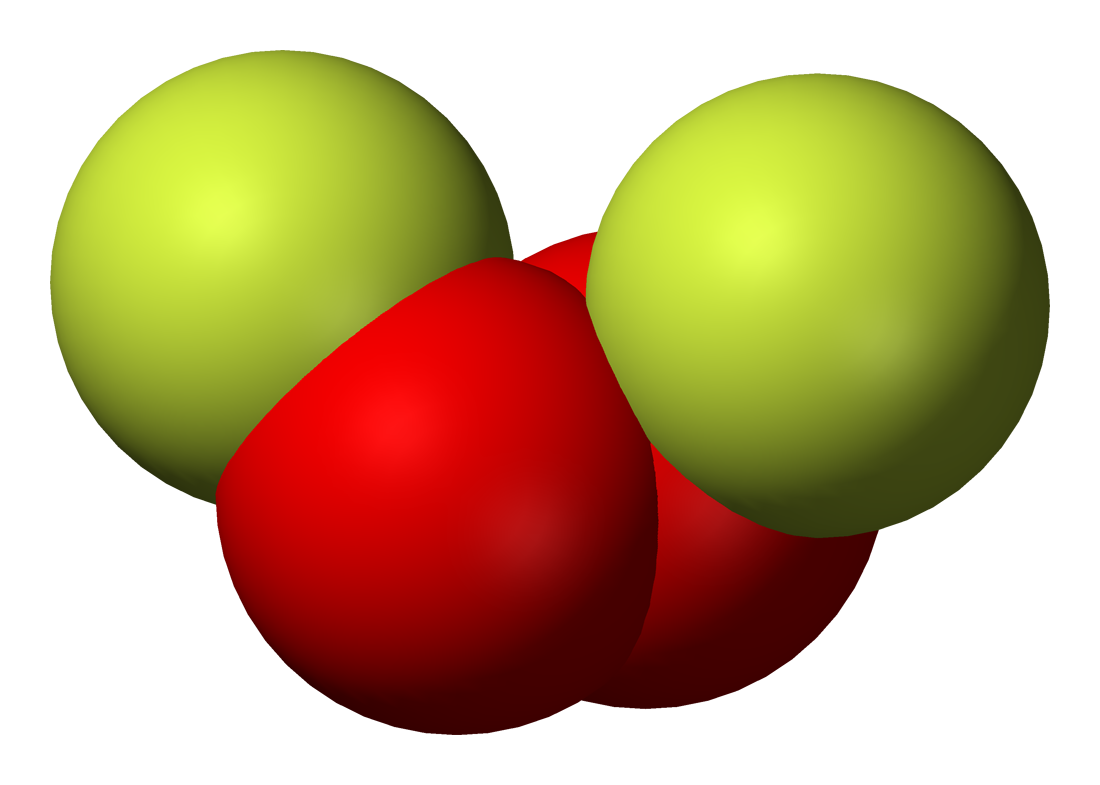
Dioxygen difluoride

O_{2}F_{2} precipitates as a brown solid upon the UV irradiation of a mixture of liquid O_{2} and F_{2} at −196 °C. It also only appears to be stable below −160 °C. The general method of preparation of many oxygen fluorides is a gas-phase electric discharge in cold containers including O_{2}F_{2}.

O_{2} + F_{2} → O_{2}F_{2} (electric discharge, 183 °C)

It is typically an orange-yellow solid which rapidly decomposes to O_{2} and F_{2} close to its normal boiling point of about 216 K.

O_{2}F_{2} reacts violently with red phosphorus, even at −196 °C. Explosions can also occur if Freon-13 is used to moderate the reaction.

=== Trioxygen difluoride or ozone difluoride (O_{3}F_{2}) ===

O_{3}F_{2} is a viscous, blood-red liquid. It remains liquid at 90 K and so can be differentiated from O_{2}F_{2} which has a melting point of about 109 K.

Like the other oxygen fluorides, O_{3}F_{2} is endothermic and decomposes at about 115 K with the evolution of heat, which is given by the following reaction:

2 O_{3}F_{2} → O_{2} + 2 O_{2}F_{2}

O_{3}F_{2} is safer to work with than ozone, and can be evaporated, or thermally decomposed, or exposed to electric sparks, without any explosions. But on contact with organic matter or oxidizable compounds, it can detonate or explode. Thus, the addition of even one drop of ozone difluoride to solid anhydrous ammonia will result in a mild explosion, when they are both at 90 K each.

=== Fluoroperoxyl ===
Fluoroperoxyl is a molecule such as O–O–F, whose chemical formula is O_{2}F and is stable only at low temperature. It has been reported to be produced from atomic fluorine and dioxygen.

O_{2} + F → O_{2}F

== General preparation of polyoxygen difluorides ==
| Reaction equation | O_{2}:F_{2} by volume | Current | Temperature of bath (°C) |
|---|---|---|---|
| O_{2} + F_{2} ⇌ O_{2}F_{2} | 1:1 | 10 – 50 mA | ~ −196° |
| 3 O_{2} + 2 F_{2} ⇌ 2 O_{3}F_{2} | 3:2 | 25 – 30 mA | ~ −196° |
| 2 O_{2} + F_{2} ⇌ O_{4}F_{2} | 2:1 | 4 – 5 mA | ~ −205° |

== Effects on ozone ==
Oxygen- and fluorine-containing radicals like O_{2}F and OF occur in the atmosphere. These along with other halogen radicals have been implicated in the destruction of ozone in the atmosphere. However, the oxygen monofluoride radicals are assumed to not play as big a role in the ozone depletion because free fluorine atoms in the atmosphere are believed to react with methane to produce hydrofluoric acid which precipitates in rain. This decreases the availability of free fluorine atoms for oxygen atoms to react with and destroy ozone molecules.

O_{3} + F → O_{2} + OF
O + OF → O_{2} + F

Net reaction:

O_{3} + O → 2 O_{2}

== Hypergolic propellant ==
Despite the low solubility of O_{3}F_{2} in liquid oxygen, it has been shown to be hypergolic with most rocket propellant fuels. The mechanism involves the boiling off oxygen from the solution containing O_{3}F_{2}, making it more reactive to have a spontaneous reaction with the rocket fuel. The degree of reactivity is also dependent on the type of fuel used.

== See also ==
- Bromine oxide
- Chlorine oxide
- Iodine oxide
- Ozone
