= Dibromine monoxide =

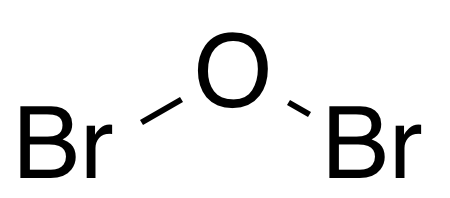

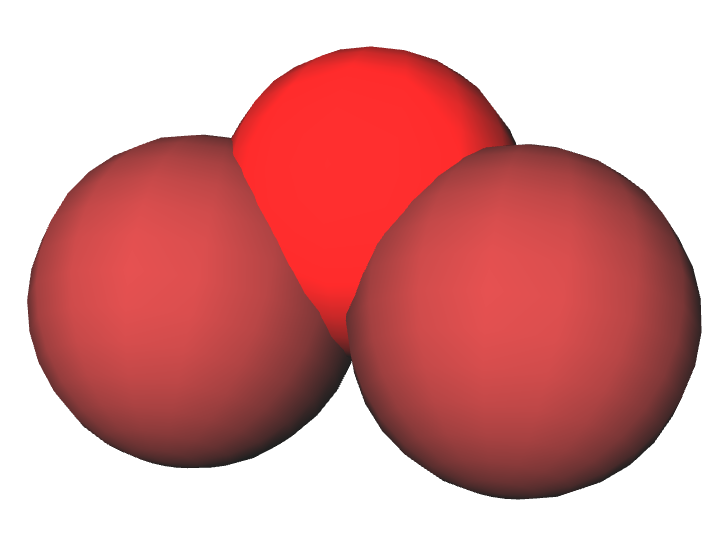

Names
- IUPAC name Dibromine monoxide
- Systematic IUPAC name Bromo hypobromite
- Other names Dibromine oxide, bromine monoxide

Identifiers
CAS Number	21308-80-5
3D model (JSmol)	Interactive image
ChemSpider	10686917
PubChem CID	14513628
- InChI: InChI=1S/Br2O/c1-3-2 Key: HJCMMOODWZOXML-UHFFFAOYSA-N
- SMILES: O(Br)Br

Properties
Chemical formula	Br_{2}O
Molar mass	175.807 g·mol^{−1}
Appearance	dark brown solid
Melting point	decomposes around −17.5°C

Related compounds
Related compounds	Water; Oxygen difluoride; Dichlorine monoxide; Diiodine monoxide
- Except where otherwise noted, data are given for materials in their standard state (at 25 °C [77 °F], 100 kPa). verify (what is ?) Infobox references

Dibromine monoxide is the chemical compound composed of bromine and oxygen with the formula Br_{2}O. It is a dark brown solid which is stable below −40 °C and is used in bromination reactions. It is similar to dichlorine monoxide, the monoxide of its halogen neighbor one period higher on the periodic table. The molecule is bent, with C_{2v} molecular symmetry. The Br−O bond length is 1.85 Å and the Br−O−Br bond angle is 112°, similar to dichlorine monoxide.

== Reactions ==
Dibromine monoxide can be prepared by reacting bromine vapor or a solution of bromine in carbon tetrachloride with mercury(II) oxide at low temperatures:

2 Br_{2} + 2 HgO → HgBr_{2}·HgO + Br_{2}O

It can also be formed by thermal decomposition of bromine dioxide or by passing an electrical current through a 1:5 mixture of bromine and oxygen gases.
