= Plutonium tetrafluoride =

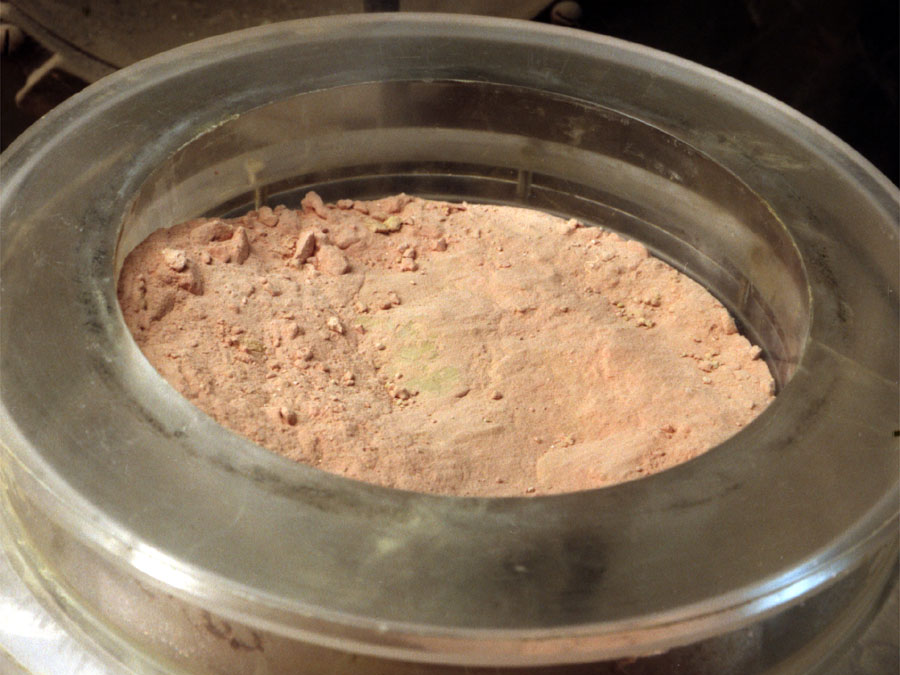
- A sample of plutonium tetrafluoride produced at the Hanford Site during the Cold War

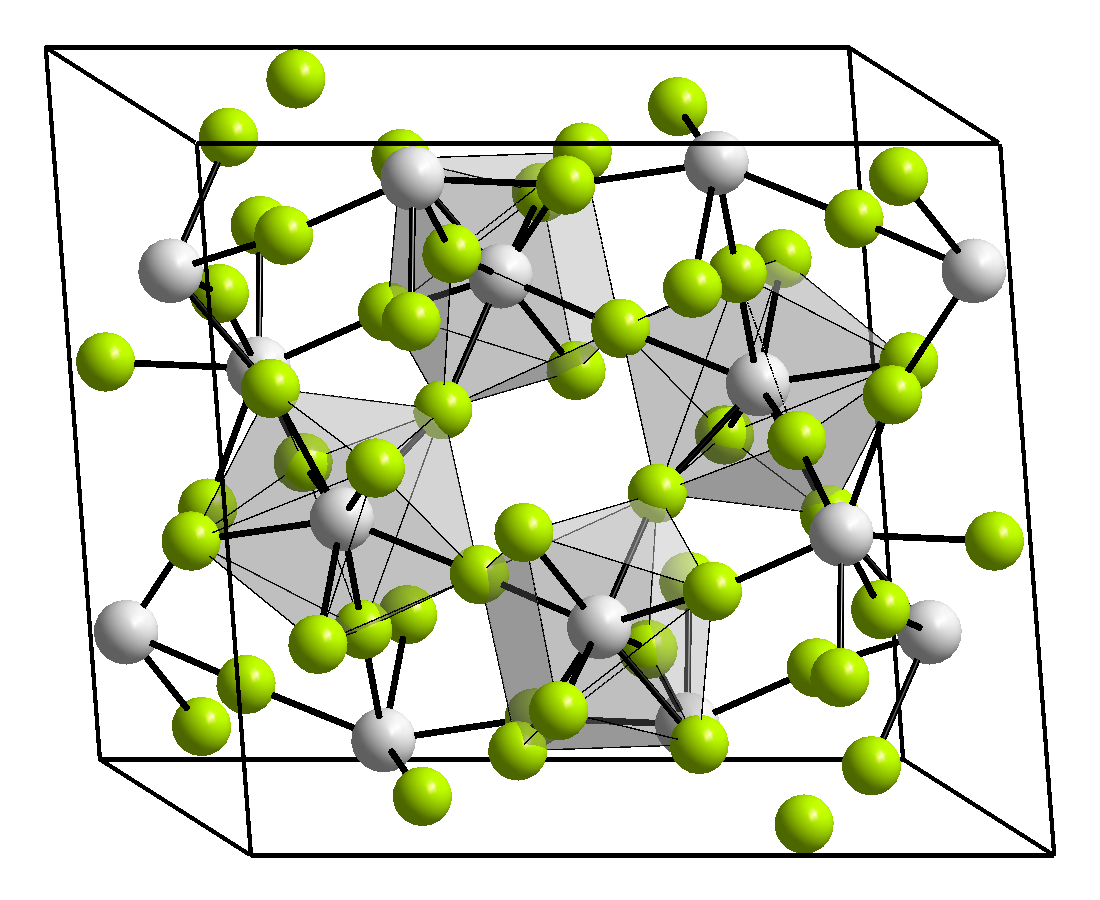

Names
- IUPAC name Plutonium(IV) fluoride
- Other names Plutonium tetrafluoride

Identifiers
| CAS Number | 13709-56-3 |
| 3D model (JSmol) | Interactive image |
| ChemSpider | 123078 |
| PubChem CID | 139558 |
| CompTox Dashboard (EPA) | DTXSID90160061 |
- InChI: InChI=1S/4FH.Pu/h4*1H;/q;;;;+4/p-4 Key: USCBBUFEOOSGAJ-UHFFFAOYSA-J
- SMILES: F[Pu](F)(F)F

Properties
| Chemical formula | PuF_{4} |
| Molar mass | 320 g/mol |
| Appearance | reddish-brown monoclinic crystals |
| Density | 7.1 g/cm^{3} |
| Melting point | 1,027 °C (1,881 °F; 1,300 K) |

Structure
| Crystal structure | Monoclinic, mS60 |
| Space group | C12/c1, No. 15 |
- Except where otherwise noted, data are given for materials in their standard state (at 25 °C [77 °F], 100 kPa). verify (what is ?) Infobox references

Plutonium(IV) fluoride is a chemical compound with the formula PuF_{4}. This salt is generally a brown solid but can appear a variety of colors depending on the grain size, purity, moisture content, lighting, and presence of contaminants. Its primary use in the United States has been as an intermediary product in the production of plutonium metal for nuclear weapons usage.

== Formation ==
Plutonium(IV) fluoride is produced in the reaction between plutonium dioxide (PuO_{2}) or plutonium(III) fluoride (PuF_{3}) with hydrofluoric acid (HF) in a stream of oxygen (O_{2}) at 450 to 600 °C. The main purpose of the oxygen stream is to avoid reduction of the product by hydrogen gas, small amounts of which are often found in HF.

PuO_{2} + O_{2} + 4 HF → PuF_{4} + O_{2} + 2 H_{2}O
4 PuF_{3} + O_{2} + 4 HF → 4 PuF_{4} + 2 H_{2}O

Laser irradiation of plutonium hexafluoride (PuF_{6}) at wavelengths under 520 nm causes it to decompose into plutonium pentafluoride (PuF_{5}) and fluorine; if this is continued, plutonium(IV) fluoride is obtained.

== Properties ==
In terms of its structure, solid plutonium(IV) fluoride features 8-coordinate Pu centers interconnected by doubly bridging fluoride ligands.

Reaction of plutonium tetrafluoride with barium, calcium, or lithium at 1200 °C gives Pu metal:

PuF_{4} + 2 Ba → 2 BaF_{2} + Pu
PuF_{4} + 2 Ca → 2 CaF_{2} + Pu
PuF_{4} + 4 Li → 4 LiF + Pu

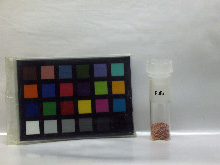
Plutonium tetrafluoride sample with example of one color illustrated through reference to a color standard
