= Alex G. Streng =

Chemist notable for his work with fluorine compounds

- Born: Russia
- Occupation: experimental chemist

Alex G. Streng was an experimental chemist, notable for his work with fluorine compounds. His work on the synthesis and properties of dioxygen difluoride, published in 1963 in the Journal of the American Chemical Society, is notorious for Streng's willingness to push the limits of experimental endeavour with this highly reactive and dangerous material.

He was married to Lucia V. Streng, who was also known for her work with fluorine compounds. The Strengs fled Russia in the 1940s, moving first to Germany, then to Philadelphia in the United States, where both eventually took research posts at Temple University.
