= Diiodine oxide =

Diiodine oxide or Iodo hypoiodite
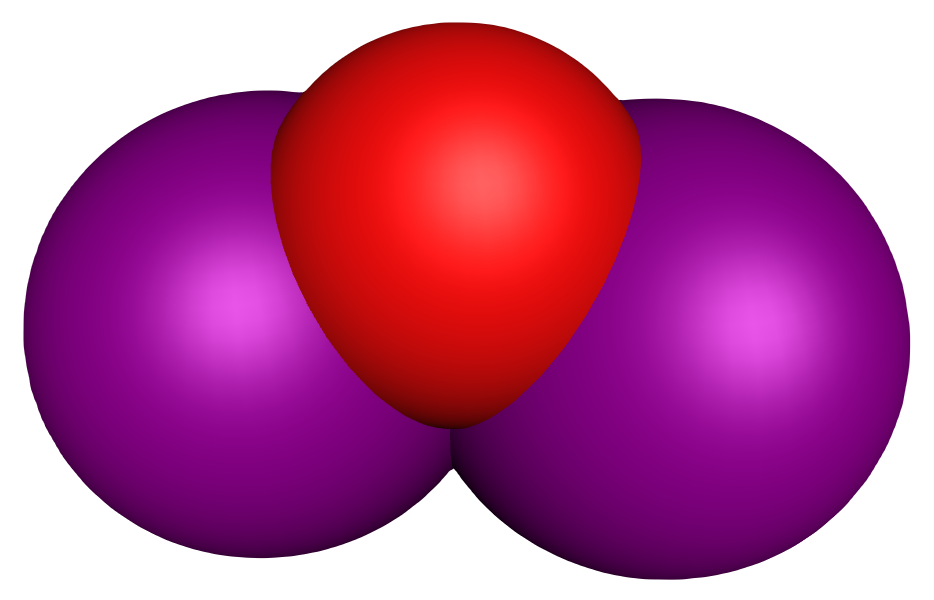

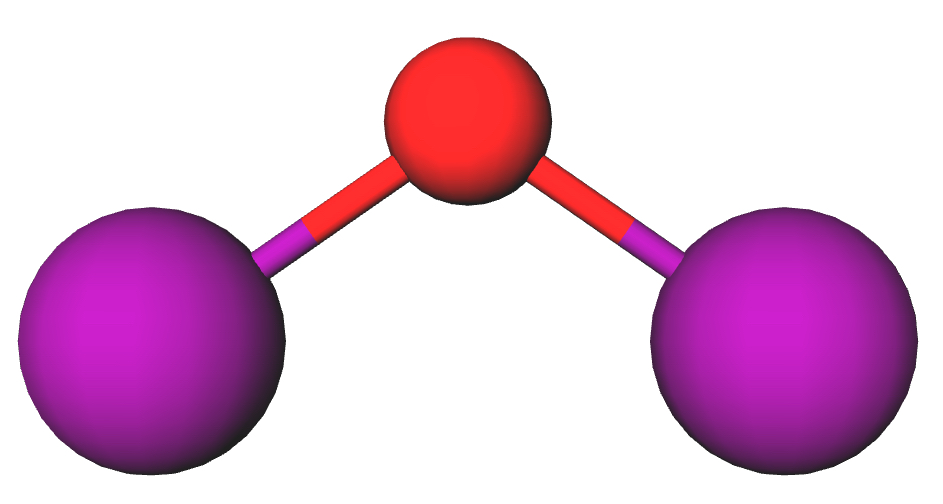

Names
- IUPAC name Diiodine oxide
- Systematic IUPAC name Iodo hypoiodite
- Other names Iodine hypoiodide, diiodooxidane, diiodine monoxide, hypoiodous anhydride

Identifiers
CAS Number	39319-71-6
3D model (JSmol)	Interactive image
PubChem CID	14513630
CompTox Dashboard (EPA)	DTXSID201336701
- InChI: InChI=1S/I2O/c1-3-2 Key: VSHDHKDWBUMJIJ-UHFFFAOYSA-N
- SMILES: O(I)I

Properties
Chemical formula	I_{2}O
Molar mass	269.808 g·mol^{−1}

Related compounds
Related compounds	Water; Oxygen difluoride; Dichlorine monoxide; Dibromine monoxide
- Except where otherwise noted, data are given for materials in their standard state (at 25 °C [77 °F], 100 kPa). Infobox references

Diiodine oxide, also known as iodo hypoiodite, is an oxide of iodine that is equivalent to an acid anhydride of hypoiodous acid. This substance is unstable and it is very difficult to isolate.

== Preparation ==
Diiodine oxide can be prepared by reacting iodine with potassium iodate (KIO_{3}) in 96% sulfuric acid and then extracting it into chlorinated solvents.

== Reactions ==
Diiodine oxide reacts with water to form hypoiodous acid:

I_{2}O + H_{2}O → 2 HIO
