= Nickel tetrafluoride =

Names
- IUPAC name Nickel(IV) fluoride
- Other names: Nickel tetrafluoride; Tetrafluoridonickel

Identifiers
CAS Number	60765-13-1
3D model (JSmol)	Interactive image
ChEBI	CHEBI:30392
Gmelin Reference	1565370
- InChI: InChI=1S/4FH.Ni/h4*1H;/q;;;;+4/p-4 Key: HSQLWDFHNPKAME-UHFFFAOYSA-J
- SMILES: F[Ni](F)(F)F

Properties
Chemical formula	NiF_{4}
Molar mass	134.6870 g·mol^{−1}
Appearance	tan solid

Related compounds
Related compounds	Cobalt tetrafluoride; Iron tetrafluoride
- Except where otherwise noted, data are given for materials in their standard state (at 25 °C [77 °F], 100 kPa). Infobox references

Nickel tetrafluoride is an inorganic compound with a chemical formula NiF_{4}.

== Synthesis ==
Nickel tetrafluoride is claimed to result from the reaction of [XeF_{5}]_{2}[NiF_{6}] (pentafluoroxenonium(IV) hexafluoronickelate(IV)) with AsF_{5} and K_{2}[NiF_{6}] with BF_{3}.

== Chemical properties ==
Nickel tetrafluoride is an extremely strong oxidizer. The oxidizing properties are enhanced in presence of Lewis acids in anhydrous HF. In terms of oxidizing power, it is comparable to krypton difluoride. It can oxidize bromine pentafluoride BrF_{5} to hexafluorobromonium(VII) cation [BrF_{6}]^{+}, potassium hexafluoroplatinate(V) K[PtF_{6}] to platinum(VI) fluoride PtF_{6}.
