= Krypton difluoride =

Skeletal formula of krypton difluoride with a dimension
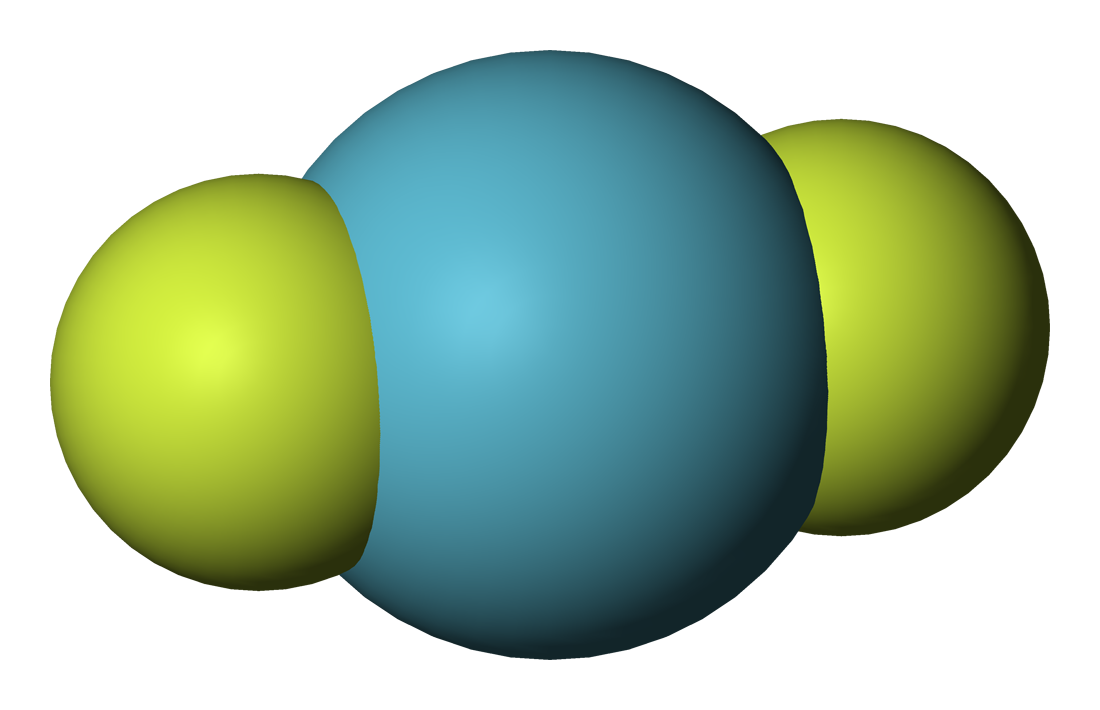
Spacefill model of krypton difluoride

Names
- IUPAC name Krypton difluoride
- Other names Krypton fluoride Krypton(II) fluoride

Identifiers
CAS Number	13773-81-4
3D model (JSmol)	Interactive image
ChemSpider	75543
PubChem CID	83721
UNII	A91DJL4OJC
CompTox Dashboard (EPA)	DTXSID7065623
- InChI: InChI=1S/KrF2/c1-3-2 Key: QGOSZQZQVQAYFS-UHFFFAOYSA-N; InChI=1/F2Kr/c1-3-2 Key: QGOSZQZQVQAYFS-UHFFFAOYAJ
- SMILES: F[Kr]F

Properties
Chemical formula	F_{2}Kr
Molar mass	121.795 g·mol^{−1}
Appearance	Colourless crystals (solid)
Density	3.24 g cm^{−3} (solid)
Solubility in water	Reacts

Structure
Crystal structure	Body-centered tetragonal
Space group	P4_{2}/mnm, No. 136
Lattice constant	a = 0.4585 nm, c = 0.5827 nm
Molecular shape	Linear
Dipole moment	0 D

Related compounds
Related compounds	Xenon difluoride
- Except where otherwise noted, data are given for materials in their standard state (at 25 °C [77 °F], 100 kPa). verify (what is ?) Infobox references

Krypton difluoride, KrF_{2} is a chemical compound of krypton and fluorine. It was the first compound of krypton discovered. It is a volatile, colourless solid at room temperature. The structure of the KrF_{2} molecule is linear, with Kr−F distances of 188.9 pm. It reacts with strong Lewis acids to form salts of the KrF^{+} and Kr_{2}F_{3}^{+} cations.

The atomization energy of KrF_{2} (KrF_{2}(g) → Kr(g) + 2 F(g)) is 92 kJ/mol (21.9 kcal/mol), giving an average Kr–F bond energy of only 46 kJ/mol (11 kcal/mol), the weakest of any isolable fluoride. In comparison, the dissociation of difluorine to atomic fluorine requires cleaving a F–F bond with a bond dissociation energy of 150 kJ/mol (36 kcal/mol). Consequently, KrF_{2} is a good source of the extremely reactive and oxidizing atomic fluorine. It is thermally unstable, with a decomposition rate of 10 % per hour at room temperature. The formation of krypton difluoride is endothermic, with a heat of formation (gas) of 57–64 kJ/mol (13.6–15.2 kcal/mol) measured at 93 °C.

== Synthesis ==
Krypton difluoride can be synthesized using many different methods including electrical discharge, photoionization, hot wire, and proton bombardment. The product can be stored at −78 °C without decomposition.

=== Electrical discharge ===
Electric discharge was the first method used to make krypton difluoride. It was also used in the only experiment ever reported to produce krypton tetrafluoride, although the identification of krypton tetrafluoride was later shown to be mistaken. The electrical discharge method involves having 1:1 to 2:1 mixtures of F_{2} to Kr at a pressure of 5.3 to 8.0 kPa (40 to 60 Torr) and then arcing large amounts of energy between it. Rates of almost 0.25 g/h can be achieved. The problem with this method is that it is unreliable with respect to yield.

=== Proton bombardment ===
Using proton bombardment for the production of KrF_{2} has a maximum production rate of about 1 g/h. This is achieved by bombarding mixtures of Kr and F_{2} with a proton beam operating at an energy level of 10 MeV and at a temperature of about 133 K (−140 °C). It is a fast method of producing relatively large amounts of KrF_{2}, but requires a source of high-energy protons, which usually would come from a cyclotron.

=== Photochemical ===
The successful photochemical synthesis of krypton difluoride was first reported by Lucia V. Streng in 1963. It was next reported in 1975 by J. Slivnik. The photochemical process for the production of KrF_{2} involves the use of UV light and can produce under ideal circumstances 1.22 g/h. The ideal wavelengths to use are in the range of 303–313 nm. Harder UV radiation is detrimental to the production of KrF_{2}. Using Pyrex glass, Vycor, or quartz will significantly increase yield because they all block harder UV light. In a series of experiments performed by S. A Kinkead et al., it was shown that a quartz insert (UV cut off of 170 nm) produced on average 158 mg/h, Vycor 7913 (UV cut off of 210 nm) produced on average 204 mg/h and Pyrex 7740 (UV cut off of 280 nm) produced on average 507 mg/h. It is clear from these results that higher-energy ultraviolet light reduces the yield significantly. The ideal circumstances for the production KrF_{2} by a photochemical process appear to occur when krypton is a solid and fluorine is a liquid, which occur at 77 K (−196 °C). The biggest problem with this method is that it requires the handling of liquid F_{2} and the potential of it being released if it becomes overpressurized.

=== Hot wire ===
The hot wire method for the production of KrF_{2} uses krypton in a solid state with a hot wire running a few centimeters away from it as fluorine gas is then run past the wire. The wire has a large current, causing it to reach temperatures around 680 °C. This causes the fluorine gas to split into its radicals, which then can react with the solid krypton. Under ideal conditions, it has been known to reach a maximum yield of 6 g/h. In order to achieve optimal yields the gap between the wire and the solid krypton should be 1 cm, giving rise to a temperature gradient of about 900 °C/cm. A major downside to this method is the amount of electricity that has to be passed through the wire. It is dangerous if not properly set up.

== Structure ==
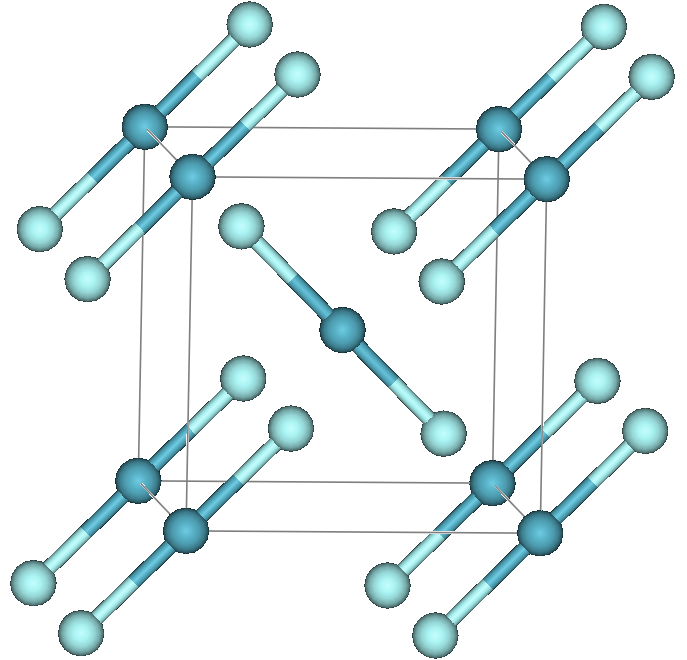
β-KrF_{2}

Krypton difluoride can exist in one of two possible crystallographic morphologies: α-phase and β-phase. β-KrF_{2} generally exists at above −80 °C, while α-KrF_{2} is more stable at lower temperatures. The unit cell of α-KrF_{2} is body-centred tetragonal.

== Reactions ==
Krypton difluoride is primarily a powerful oxidising and fluorinating agent, more powerful even than elemental fluorine because Kr–F has less bond energy. It has a redox potential of +3.5 V for the KrF_{2}/Kr couple, making it the most powerful known oxidising agent. However, the hypothetical KrF_{4} could be even stronger and nickel tetrafluoride comes close.

For example, krypton difluoride can oxidise gold to its highest-known oxidation state, +5:

7 KrF_{2} + 2 Au → 2 KrF^{+}AuF^{−}_{6} + 5 Kr

KrF^{+}AuF^{−}_{6} decomposes at 60 °C into gold(V) fluoride and krypton and fluorine gases:

[KrF^{+}][AuF^{−}_{6}] → AuF_{5} + Kr + F_{2}

KrF_{2} can also directly oxidise xenon to xenon hexafluoride:

3 KrF_{2} + Xe → XeF_{6} + 3 Kr

KrF_{2} is used to synthesize the highly reactive BrF^{+}_{6} cation. KrF_{2} reacts with SbF_{5} to form the salt KrF^{+}SbF^{−}_{6}; the KrF^{+} cation is capable of oxidising both BrF_{5} and ClF_{5} to BrF^{+}_{6} and ClF^{+}_{6}, respectively.

KrF_{2} can also react with elemental silver to produce AgF_{3}.

Irradiation of a crystal of KrF_{2} at 77 K (−196 °C) with γ-rays leads to the formation of the krypton monofluoride radical, KrF•, a violet-colored species that was identified by its ESR spectrum. The radical, trapped in the crystal lattice, is stable indefinitely at 77 K but decomposes at 120 K (−153 °C).

== See also ==
- Krypton fluoride laser

== General reading ==
- Greenwood, Norman N.; Earnshaw, Alan (1997). Chemistry of the Elements (2nd ed.). Butterworth-Heinemann. doi:10.1016/C2009-0-30414-6. ISBN 978-0-08-037941-8.
