= Dichlorine monoxide =

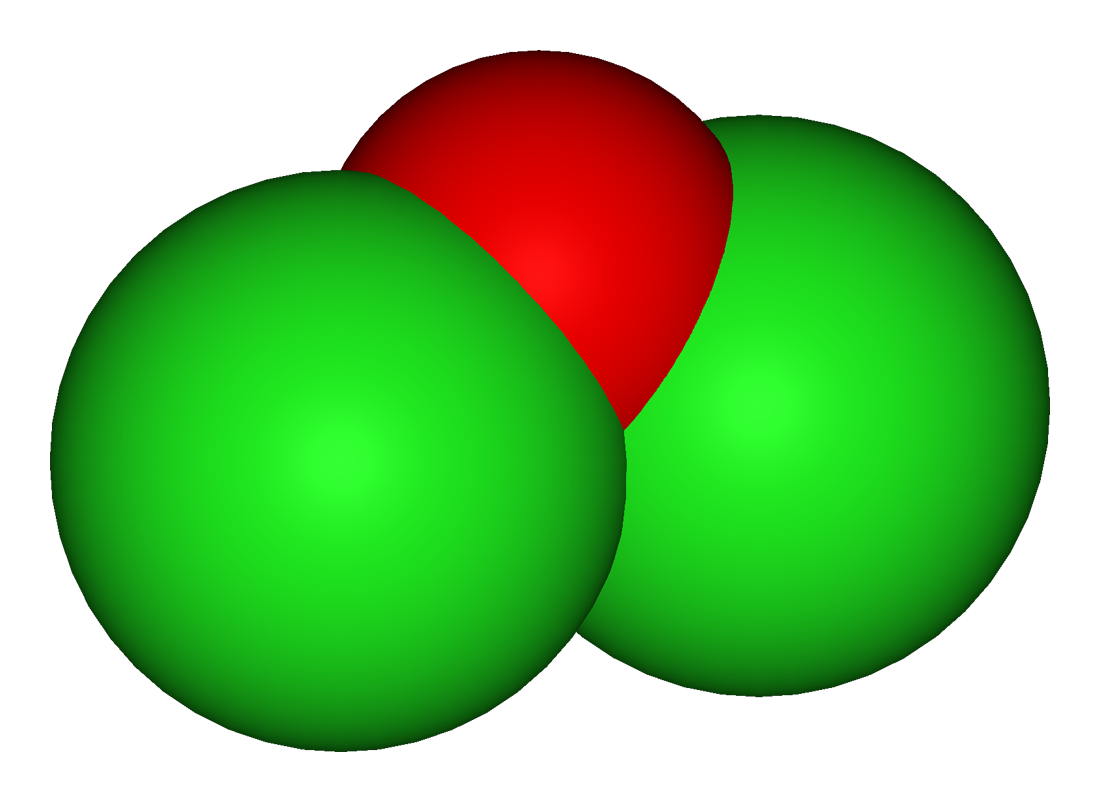

Names
- IUPAC name Oxygen dichloride
- Systematic IUPAC name Dichloridooxygen; Dichlorooxidane
- Other names Dichlorine (mon)oxide Chlorine(I) oxide Hypochlorous oxide Hypochlorous anhydride Chloro hypochlorite

Identifiers
CAS Number	7791-21-1
3D model (JSmol)	Interactive image
ChEBI	CHEBI:30198
ChemSpider	23048
ECHA InfoCard	100.029.312
PubChem CID	24646
UNII	0EQ5I4TK19
CompTox Dashboard (EPA)	DTXSID50893909
- InChI: InChI=1S/Cl2O/c1-3-2 Key: RCJVRSBWZCNNQT-UHFFFAOYSA-N; InChI=1/Cl2O/c1-3-2 Key: RCJVRSBWZCNNQT-UHFFFAOYAA
- SMILES: ClOCl

Properties
Chemical formula	Cl_{2}O
Molar mass	86.90 g·mol^{−1}
Appearance	brownish-yellow gas
Melting point	−120.6 °C (−185.1 °F; 152.6 K)
Boiling point	2.0 °C (35.6 °F; 275.1 K)
Solubility in water	very soluble, hydrolyses 143 g Cl_{2}O per 100 g water
Solubility in other solvents	soluble in CCl_{4}

Structure
Dipole moment	0.78 ± 0.08 D

Thermochemistry
Std molar entropy (S^{⦵}_{298})	265.9 J K^{−1} mol^{−1}
Std enthalpy of formation (Δ_{f}H^{⦵}_{298})	+80.3 kJ mol^{−1}

Hazards
- GHS labelling
Pictograms	(GHS05: Corrosive) (GHS09: Environmental hazard)
Signal word	Danger
Hazard statements	H290, H314, H400, H411
Precautionary statements	P234, P260, P264, P273, P280, P301+P330+P331, P303+P361+P353, P304+P340, P305+P351+P338, P310, P311, P321, P363, P390, P391, P405, P501
NFPA 704 (fire diamond)	3 4 3 OX
- Safety data sheet (SDS)

Related compounds
Other cations	Water; Dibromine monoxide; Diiodine monoxide
Related compounds	Oxygen difluoride, nitrous oxide, chlorine dioxide
- Except where otherwise noted, data are given for materials in their standard state (at 25 °C [77 °F], 100 kPa). verify (what is ?) Infobox references

Dichlorine monoxide (IUPAC name: oxygen dichloride) is an inorganic compound with the molecular formula Cl_{2}O. It was first synthesised in 1834 by Antoine Jérôme Balard, who along with Gay-Lussac also determined its composition. In older literature it is often referred to as chlorine monoxide, which can be a source of confusion as that name now refers to the ClO^{•} radical.

At room temperature it exists as a brownish-yellow gas which is soluble in both water and organic solvents. Chemically, it is a member of the chlorine oxide family of compounds, as well as being the anhydride of hypochlorous acid. It is a strong oxidiser and chlorinating agent.

== Preparation ==
The earliest method of synthesis was to treat mercury(II) oxide with chlorine gas.

2 Cl_{2} + HgO → HgCl_{2} + Cl_{2}O

A safer and more convenient method of production is the reaction of chlorine gas with hydrated sodium carbonate at 20–30 °C (68–86 °F).

2 Cl_{2} + 2 Na_{2}CO_{3} + H_{2}O → Cl_{2}O + 2 NaHCO_{3} + 2 NaCl
2 Cl_{2} + 2 NaHCO_{3} → Cl_{2}O + 2 CO_{2} + 2 NaCl + H_{2}O

This reaction can be performed in the absence of water but requires heating to 150–250 °C (302–482 °F):

2 Cl_{2} + Na_{2}CO_{3} → Cl_{2}O + CO_{2} + 2 NaCl

Since dichlorine monoxide is unstable at these temperatures it must therefore be continuously removed to prevent thermal decomposition.

== Structure ==
The structure of dichlorine monoxide is similar to that of water and hypochlorous acid, with the molecule adopting a bent molecular geometry (due to the lone pairs on the oxygen atom) and resulting in C_{2V} molecular symmetry. The bond angle is slightly larger than normal, likely due to steric repulsion between the bulky chlorine atoms.

In the solid state, it crystallises in the tetrahedral space group I4_{1}/amd, making it isostructural to the high pressure form of water, ice VIII.

== Reactions ==
Dichlorine monoxide is highly soluble in water, where it exists in an equilibrium with HOCl. The rate of hydrolysis is slow enough to allow the extraction of Cl_{2}O with organic solvents such as CCl_{4}, but the equilibrium constant ultimately favours the formation of hypochlorous acid.

2 HOCl ⇌ Cl_{2}O + H_{2}O K (0 °C) = 3.55 × 10^{−3} dm^{3}/mol

Despite this, it has been suggested that dichlorine monoxide may be the active species in the reactions of HOCl with olefins and aromatic compounds, as well as in the chlorination of drinking water.

=== With inorganic compounds ===
Dichlorine monoxide reacts with metal halides, with the loss of Cl_{2}, to form unusual oxyhalides.

VOCl_{3} + Cl_{2}O → VO_{2}Cl + 2 Cl_{2}
TiCl_{4} + Cl_{2}O → TiOCl_{2} + 2 Cl_{2}
SbCl_{5} + 2 Cl_{2}O → SbO_{2}Cl + 4 Cl_{2}

Similar reactions have also been observed with certain inorganic halides.

AsCl_{3} + 2 Cl_{2}O → AsO_{2}Cl + 3 Cl_{2}
NOCl + Cl_{2}O → NO_{2}Cl + Cl_{2}

=== With organic compounds ===
Dichlorine monoxide is an effective chlorinating agent. It can be used for either the side-chain or ring chlorination of deactivated aromatic substrates. For activated aromatics such as phenols and aryl-ethers it primarily reacts to give ring halogenated products. It has been suggested that dichlorine monoxide may be the active species in the reactions of HOCl with olefins and aromatic compounds.

=== Photochemistry ===
Dichlorine monoxide undergoes photodissociation, eventually forming O_{2} and Cl_{2}. The process is primarily radical based, with flash photolysis showing radical hypochlorite (ClO·) to be a key intermediate.

2 Cl_{2}O → 2 Cl_{2} + O_{2}

=== Explosive properties ===
Dichlorine monoxide is explosive, although there is a lack of modern research into this behaviour. Room temperature mixtures with oxygen could not be detonated by an electric spark until they contained at least 23.5% Cl_{2}O which is an exceedingly high minimum explosive limit. There are conflicting reports of it exploding on exposure to strong light. Heating above 120 °C, or a rapid rate of heating at lower temperatures also apparently lead to explosions. Liquid dichlorine monoxide has been reported to be shock-sensitive.
