= Hexaoxygen difluoride =

Identifiers
CAS Number	12191-80-9
3D model (JSmol)	Interactive image
- InChI: InChI=1S/F2O6/c1-3-5-7-8-6-4-2 Key: PHJAHINOOJESQK-UHFFFAOYSA-N
- SMILES: FOOOOOOF

Properties
Chemical formula	F_{2}O_{6}
Molar mass	133.991 g·mol^{−1}
Appearance	dark-brown solid at 60 K
- Except where otherwise noted, data are given for materials in their standard state (at 25 °C [77 °F], 100 kPa). Infobox references

Hexaoxygen difluoride is a binary inorganic compound of fluorine and oxygen with the chemical formula O_{6}F_{2}. The compound is one of many known oxygen fluorides.

== Synthesis ==
The compound can be prepared by electric discharges through the F_{2}—O_{2} mixture of the certain molar ratio at 60 to 77 K. The ratio is predicted to be 6:2.

== Physical properties ==
Hexaoxygen difluoride is an oxidizing agent. At 60 K, the compound looks like a dark-brown crystalline solid. If slowly warmed, it decomposes to lower oxygen fluorides and ozone. If quickly warmed to 90 K, it explodes, creating O_{2} and F_{2}.
