= Plutonium pentafluoride =

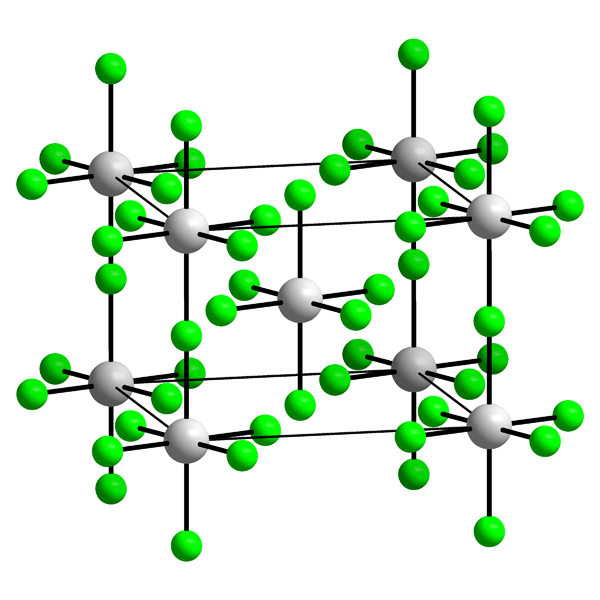

Names
- Other names plutonium(V) fluoride

Identifiers
CAS Number	31479-19-3
3D model (JSmol)	Interactive image
ChemSpider	124961
PubChem CID	141636
CompTox Dashboard (EPA)	30185379
- InChI: InChI=1S/5FH.Pu/h5*1H;/q;;;;;+5/p-5 Key: SZQALXDXHXGSHK-UHFFFAOYSA-I
- SMILES: F[Pu](F)(F)(F)F

Properties
Chemical formula	F_{5}Pu
Molar mass	339 g·mol^{−1}
Appearance	white solid

Structure
Crystal structure	tetragonal

Related compounds
Related compounds	Uranium pentafluoride
- Except where otherwise noted, data are given for materials in their standard state (at 25 °C [77 °F], 100 kPa). Infobox references

Plutonium pentafluoride is a binary inorganic compound of plutonium and fluorine with the chemical formula PuF_{5}.

== Synthesis ==
Photodissociation of gaseous plutonium hexafluoride to plutonium pentafluoride and fluorine.

== Physical properties ==
Plutonium pentafluoride forms a white solid.

== Hazards ==
Plutonium pentafluoride is toxic and radioactive.
