= Håkan Streng =

Swedo-Finnish troubadour and poet

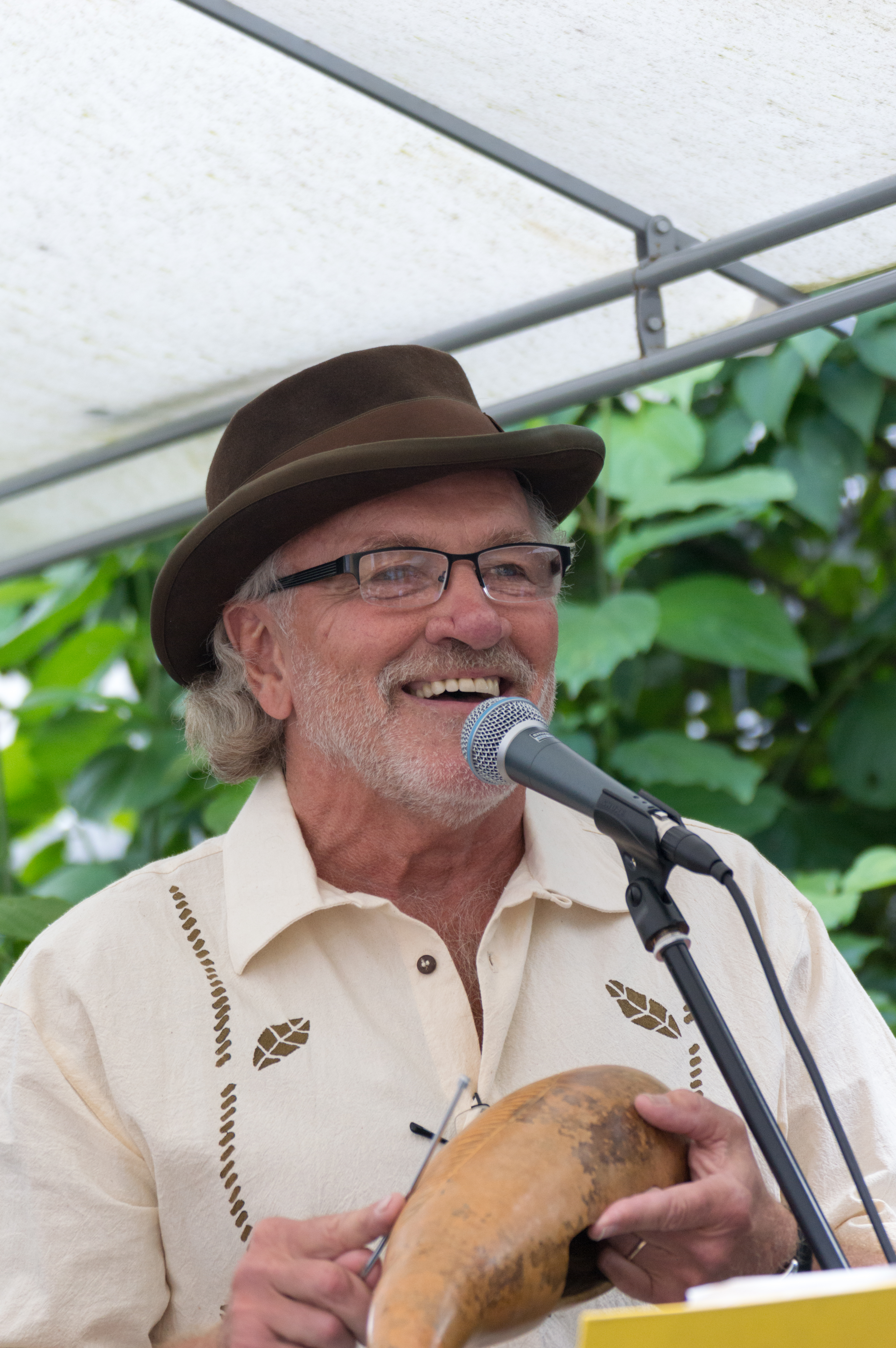
Håkan Streng

Håkan Ralf Streng (born 21 January 1947) is a Finland-Swedish troubadour and poet.

Born in Jakobstad, Finland, he is the son of supervisor Valter Johannes Streng and nurse Alice Matilda Kronsten. He married Brita Kristina Herler in 1972, and their relationship ended in a divorce, and then married Ulla Grönvall-Streng in 2005. Streng graduated from Jakobstad Samlyceum in 1966. He received a Master of Science in Economics from Handelshögskolan at Åbo Akademi University in 1977 and has also worked as a pharmaceutical representative, research assistant at Åbo Akademi University, private entrepreneur and sales promoter.

Streng formed Trio Saludo in 1973 with actor Arto Rintamäki (born 1950) and Peter Ingo (born 1947), which gained popularity with its mix of Latin American songs and Nordic ballads. The trio's music was characterized by skillful vocals, accompanied mainly by guitar and rhythm instruments. In 2005, a CD with the most popular works from the 1970s and 1980s was released, at the same time as the trio reunited in a new version for a short tour.

Streng is best known as a solo artist for his ballads in the Ostrobothnian dialect, manifested through the popular albums Heimlaga (1979), Meir heimlaga (1980) and his return to the genre, Tibaaks ti röötre (2004). He is also the managing director of Heimlaga-Music Kb. He has also performed in pubs and on television programs together with Ami Aspelund and sung in a duo with Cuban singer Maria de Jesus, which resulted in the album Till dig (2000). Streng's repertoire also includes shanties and spiritual songs. He is one of the founders of the association Visans Vänner in Vasanejden and was its first chairman in 1976–1977. He has also published poetry collections, including Gränsfall (1980).

== Bibliography ==
- 1980 – Gränsfall
- 1982 – Jord, eld, vatten och vind
- 2007 – Mitt liv - en sång

== Discography ==
- 1976 – Gå förbi med en sång
- 1978 – Dagboken
- 1979 – Heimlaga
- 1980 – Gungan
- 1980 – Meir heimlaga
- 1983 – Indiansommar
- 1984 – Det fina i livet
- 1986 – Vid kvällens slut
- 1987 – So schön ist die Weld
- 1987 – Niin kaunis on maa
- 1989 – Med dig i mina armar I
- 1989 – Med dig i mina armar II
- 1992 – Du och Jag
- 1994 – Der Wienertrubadour
- 1994 – Wientrubaduren
- 1990 – För fulla segel - Täysin purjein
- 1995 – The Finnish Crew - Ralph & Roger - Sailing again
- 1997 – Internationell Shanty Festival
- 2000 – Till Dig
- 2004 – Tibaaks ti röötre - Heimlaga ä bäst
- 2006 – Vägen väntar vandraren
- 2007 – Föd mig visa – Fyll mig sång
- 2010 - Jag har sökt mig en Jul
