= Fluorine etching =

Printmaking technique developed by artists of 20th century

- Woodblock printing: 200
- Movable type: 1040
- Intaglio (printmaking): 1430
- Printing press: c. 1440
- Etching: c. 1515
- Mezzotint: 1642
- Relief printing: 1690
- Aquatint: 1772
- Lithography: 1796
- Chromolithography: 1837
- Rotary press: 1843
- Hectograph: 1860
- Offset printing: 1875
- Hot metal typesetting: 1884
- Mimeograph: 1885
- Daisy wheel printing: 1889
- Photostat and rectigraph: 1907
- Screen printing: 1911
- Spirit duplicator: 1923
- Dot matrix printing: 1925
- Xerography: 1938
- Spark printing: 1940
- Phototypesetting: 1949
- Inkjet printing: 1950
- Dye-sublimation: 1957
- Laser printing: 1969
- Thermal printing: c. 1972
- Solid ink printing: 1972
- Thermal-transfer printing: 1981
- 3D printing: 1986
- Digital printing: 1991

Fluorine etching is a printmaking technique developed by a circle of artists working in Kraków and Warsaw in the first two decades of the twentieth century. It is likely that both the detrimental effects on the health of engravers and the fragility of the material resulted in this technique being abandoned.

== History ==
The novel way of printmaking known as fluorine etching was developed by the Polish chemist Tadeusz Estreicher (1871–1952) in the early years of the twentieth century. Commercial glass-makers everywhere had been using etching as a standard decoration for drinking and other glasses since the mid-nineteenth century as a cheaper alternative to engraving. Toxic hydrofluoric acid was also used to mark glass tubes used in science laboratories. For fluorine etching, however, as first described in 1912 by Hieronim Wilder, a normal glass plate was coated with colophony (a solid resin obtained from certain types of conifers), followed by the artist etching a design into it, which was then treated with hydrofluoric acid. The glass plate was inked, wiped and printed using a rolling press in the same way as a traditional etched copperplate, with the printer carefully avoiding the danger of the glass breaking under the pressure of the rollers. The glass easily shattered, which may have been why not many prints in this technique were made or have survived.

A glass matrix had previously been used in France for cliché-verres by François Millet, Camille Corot and Charles Daubigny, among others. In this method, instead of etching an image, a drawing was made with a needle on a glass panel coated with collodion, a chemical used in classical photography. The composition was then exposed to light on a photosensitive paper, as in a photographic process.

== Current uses ==
Estreicher suggested to a friend of his, the Polish painter Stanisław Wyspiański (1869–1907), the idea of applying the technique used to mark glass tubes to a glass plate for artistic purposes. Wyspiański developed many compositions in this technique, dubbed fluorine etching, but now only five are known, of which three are represented in Polish collections. This unusual printmaking technique was met with interest among other Polish artists working in Kraków and Warsaw, such as Ferdynand Ruszczyc (1870–1936), Ewa Aszer-Librowicz (1883–1943) – sister of the Jewish architect and artist Jerzy Aszer (1884–1944) – Janina Bobińska (1894–1973), Bolesław Czarkowski (1873–1937), Mikalojus Konstantinas Čiurlionis (1875–1911), Ignacja Johnowa (1867–1953), Jadwiga Kernbaumówna (life dates unknown, but in 1912 she was a member of the Association Jung Art), Eugeniusz Morawski-Dąbrowa (1871–1948), Maria Płonowska (1878–1955), Emilia Wysocka (1888–1973) and Zygmunt Kamiński (1888–1969). Another artist fascinated by the new technique was Leon Wyczółkowski (1852–1936), who, as mentioned in his memoirs, made his first fluorine etching, a self-portrait in five colours, in May 1904. The last artist to use the fluorine etching technique was Stanisław Dąbrowski (1882–1973), by whom two prints of 1920, today kept in the National Library in Warsaw, are known.
