= Nitrogen fluoride =

Nitrogen fluorides are compounds of chemical elements nitrogen and fluorine. Many different nitrogen fluorides are known:

- Nitrogen monofluoride, NF
- Nitrogen difluoride radical, ·NF_{2}
- Nitrogen trifluoride, NF_{3}
- Nitrogen pentafluoride, NF_{5}
- Dinitrogen difluoride, N_{2}F_{2}
- Tetrafluorohydrazine, N_{2}F_{4}
- Fluorine azide, N_{3}F
- Tetrafluoroammonium, NF_{4}^{+}
