= Lucia V. Streng =

Russian-American chemist

- Born: November 6, 1909; Russia
- Died: April 28, 1995 (aged 85); Pennsylvania
- Education: Donetsk Mining Institute
- Known for: synthesis of krypton difluoride
- Spouse: A. G. Streng
- Scientific career
- Fields: Chemistry
- Workplaces: Temple University Research Institute

Lucia V. Streng (November 6, 1909 – April 28, 1995) was a Russian-born American chemist. She spent much of her career studying the noble gases and their properties, successfully synthesizing krypton difluoride. She and her husband, Alex G. Streng, both held positions at Temple University.

== Personal life and education ==
Streng was among the first women to receive a degree in mining engineering from Donetsk Mining Institute. She was born in the Russian Empire. During World War II she fled the Soviet Union with her husband and son. The family settled in West Germany for several years, then emigrated to the United States in 1950. Lucia Streng earned money painting china lamps until she and her husband found positions at Temple University.

== Career ==
Lucia Streng became a research associate at the Temple University Research Institute several years after her husband, Alex G. Streng, was hired as a research chemist. She performed analytical work for the federal Bureau of Mines as well as private companies. In 1963, Streng reported the successful photochemical synthesis of krypton difluoride, a result that no one else was able to produce until 1975.

Streng published a number of papers, often relating to experimental work with the noble gases krypton and xenon. Her contributions were sometimes noted in a manner less formal than shared authorship: in the acknowledgements of one of Alex Streng's papers, he thanked Lucia and another frequent collaborator, Abraham D. Kirshenbaum, for "their contributions in the experimental work."

Lucia Streng retired from the Research Institute in 1975.
