= Krypton tetrafluoride =

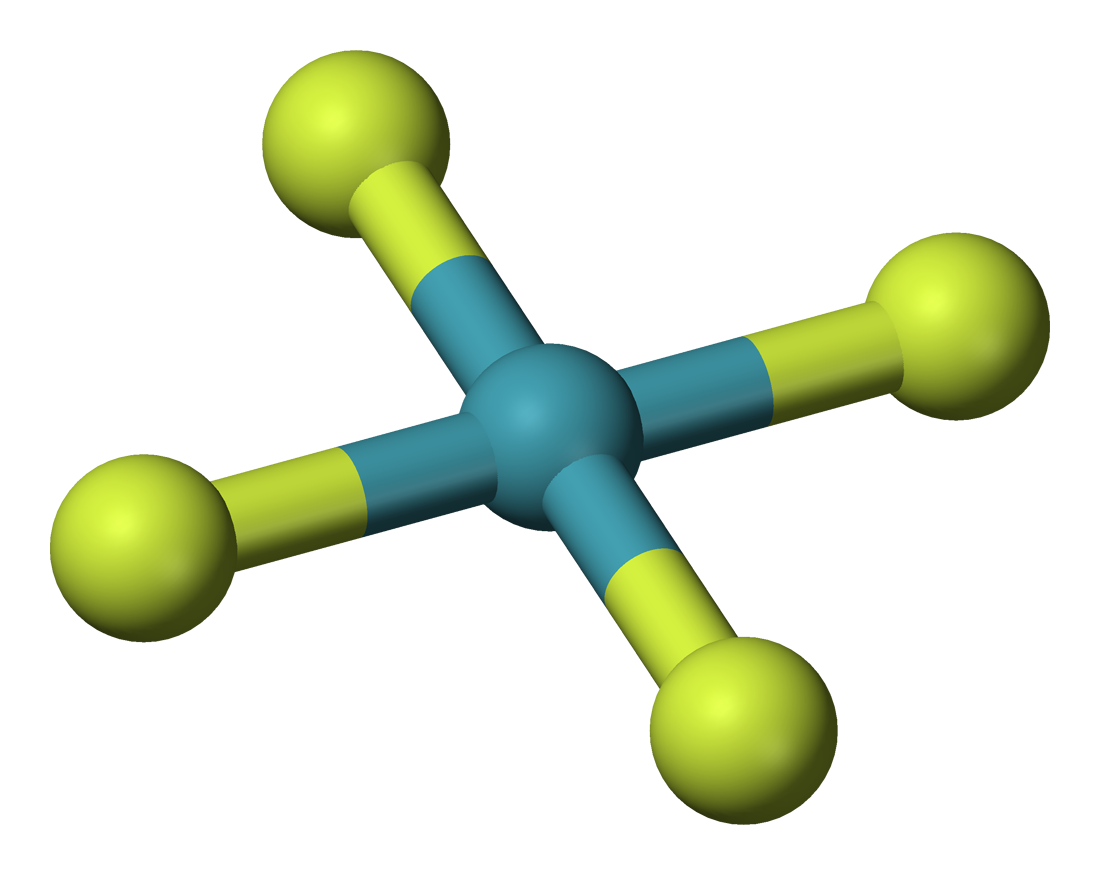

Identifiers
CAS Number	13709-53-0
3D model (JSmol)	Interactive image
CompTox Dashboard (EPA)	DTXSID901304941
- InChI: InChI=1S/F4Kr/c1-5(2,3)4 Key: PLAFPZRFEDSAJL-UHFFFAOYSA-N
- SMILES: [Kr](F)(F)(F)F

Properties
Chemical formula	F_{4}Kr
Molar mass	159.792 g·mol^{−1}
- Except where otherwise noted, data are given for materials in their standard state (at 25 °C [77 °F], 100 kPa). Infobox references

Krypton(IV) fluoride is a hypothetical inorganic chemical compound of krypton and fluorine with the chemical formula KrF_{4}. At one time researchers thought they had synthesized it, but the claim was discredited. The compound is predicted to be difficult to make and unstable if made. However, it is predicted to become stable at pressures greater than 15 GPa. Theoretical analysis indicates KrF_{4} would have an approximately square planar molecular geometry.

== Synthesis ==
The claimed synthesis was by passing electric discharge through krypton-fluorine mixture:

Kr + 2F_{2} → KrF_{4}

== Physical properties ==
The claimed compound formed white crystalline solid. Thermally, it is less stable than XeF_{4}.
