= Dioxygen difluoride =

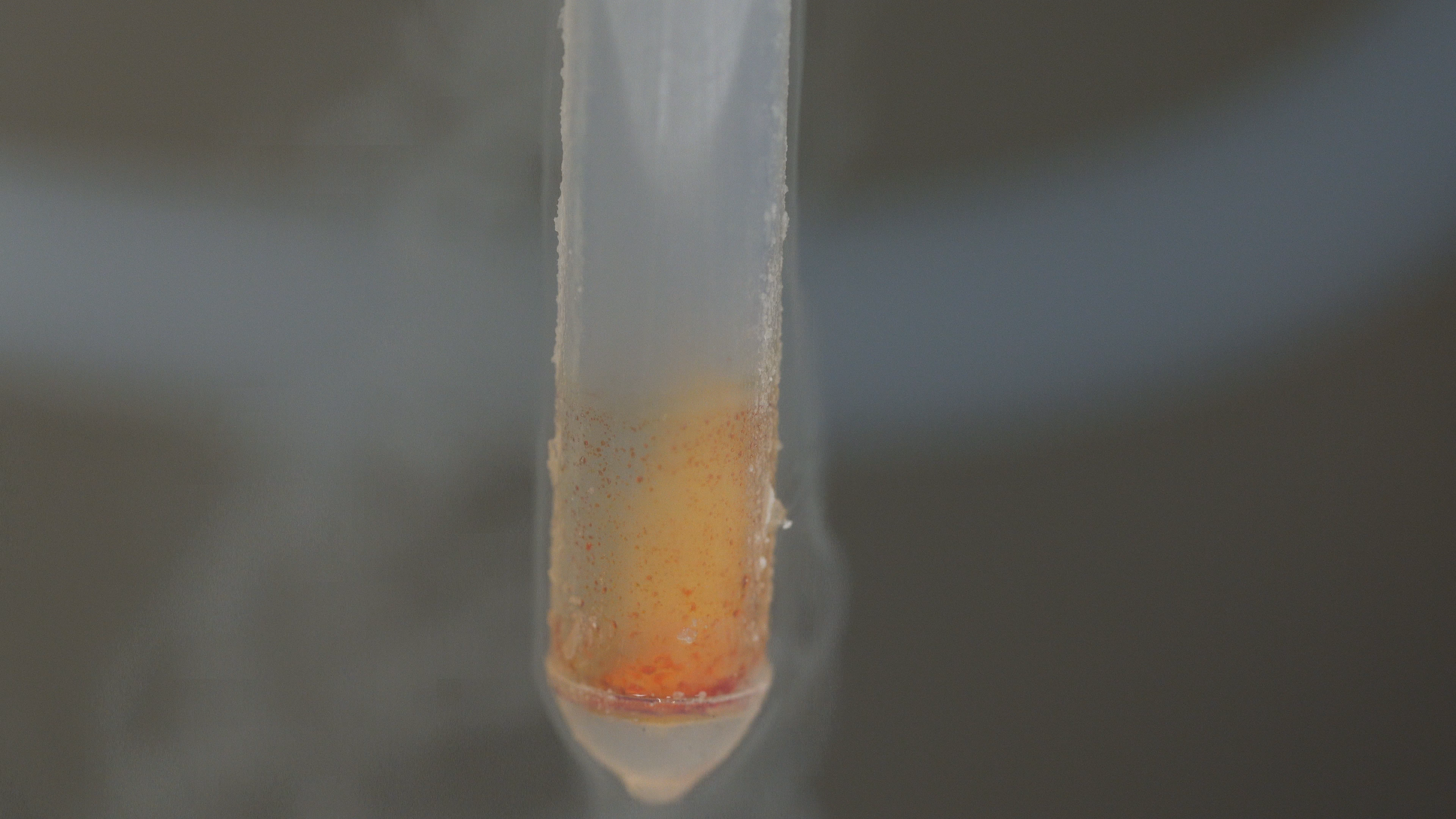

Stick model of dioxygen difluoride
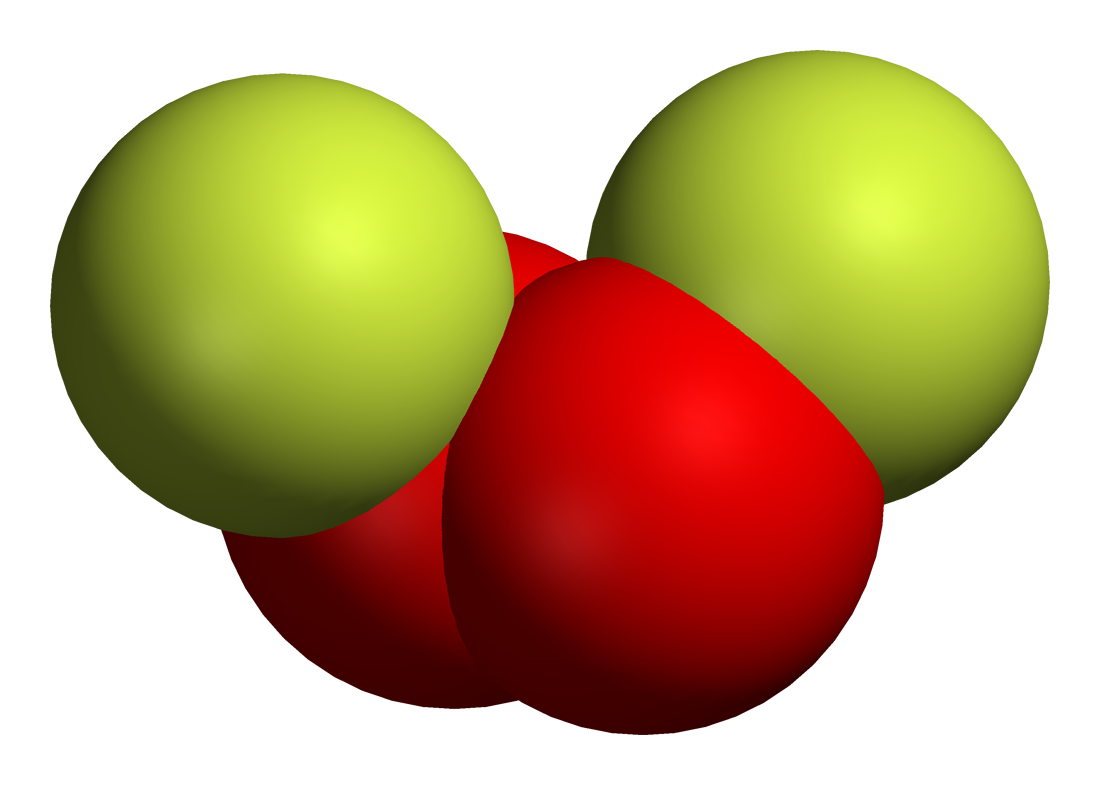
Spacefill model of dioxygen difluoride

Names
- Preferred IUPAC name Dioxygen difluoride
- Systematic IUPAC name: Difluorodioxidane; Fluorooxygen hypofluorite
- Other names: Monofluorooxygenyl hypofluorite; Peroxydifluoride; Oxygen perfluoride; Oxyfluoryl hypofluorite; Fluorine peroxide; Fluorinated peroxide; FOOF

Identifiers
CAS Number	7783-44-0
3D model (JSmol)	Interactive image
Abbreviations	FOOF
ChEBI	CHEBI:47866
ChemSpider	109870
Gmelin Reference	1570
PubChem CID	123257
UNII	XWQ158QF24
CompTox Dashboard (EPA)	DTXSID70228451
- InChI: InChI=1S/F2O2/c1-3-4-2 Key: REAOZOPEJGPVCB-UHFFFAOYSA-N; InChI=1/F2O2/c1-3-4-2 Key: REAOZOPEJGPVCB-UHFFFAOYAK
- SMILES: FOOF

Properties
Chemical formula	O_{2}F_{2}
Molar mass	69.996 g·mol^{−1}
Appearance	orange as a solid red as a liquid
Density	1.45 g/cm^{3} (at b.p.)
Melting point	−154 °C (−245 °F; 119 K)
Boiling point	−57 °C (−71 °F; 216 K) extrapolated
Solubility in other solvents	decomposes

Thermochemistry
Heat capacity (C)	62.1 J/(mol·K)
Std molar entropy (S^{⦵}_{298})	277.2 J/(mol·K)
Std enthalpy of formation (Δ_{f}H^{⦵}_{298})	19.2 kJ/mol
Gibbs free energy (Δ_{f}G^{⦵})	58.2 kJ/mol

Related compounds
Related compounds	O_{3}F_{2}; H_{2}O_{2}; OF_{2}; FClO_{2}; Cl_{2}O_{2}; S_{2}Cl_{2}; S_{2}F_{2}

Hazards
- GHS labelling
Pictograms	(GHS01: Explosive) (GHS03: Oxidizing) (GHS05: Corrosive) (GHS06: Toxic) (GHS09: Environmental hazard)
Signal word	Danger
NFPA 704 (fire diamond)	4 0 4 OX
- Except where otherwise noted, data are given for materials in their standard state (at 25 °C [77 °F], 100 kPa). verify (what is ?) Infobox references

Dioxygen difluoride is a compound of fluorine and oxygen with the molecular formula O_{2}F_{2}. It can exist as an orange-red colored solid which melts into a red liquid at −163 °C (110 K). It is an extremely strong oxidant and decomposes into oxygen and fluorine even at −160 °C (113 K) at a rate of 4% per day — its lifetime at room temperature is thus extremely short. Dioxygen difluoride reacts vigorously with nearly every chemical it encounters (including ordinary ice).

== Preparation ==
Dioxygen difluoride can be obtained by subjecting a 1:1 mixture of gaseous fluorine and oxygen at low pressure (7–17 mmHg (0.9–2.3 kPa) is optimal) to an electric discharge of 25–30 mA at 2.1–2.4 kV.

A similar method was used for the first synthesis by Otto Ruff in 1933. Another synthesis involves mixing O_{2} and F_{2} in a stainless steel vessel cooled to −196 °C (77.1 K), followed by exposing the elements to 3 MeV bremsstrahlung for several hours. A third method requires heating a mix of fluorine and oxygen to 700 °C (1,292 °F), and then rapidly cooling it using liquid oxygen. All of these methods involve synthesis according to the equation

O_{2} + F_{2} → O_{2}F_{2}

It also arises from the thermal decomposition of ozone difluoride:

2 O_{3}F_{2} → 2 O_{2}F_{2} + O_{2}

== Structure and properties ==
In O_{2}F_{2}, oxygen is assigned the unusual oxidation state of +1. In most of its other compounds, oxygen has an oxidation state of −2.

The structure of dioxygen difluoride resembles that of hydrogen peroxide, H_{2}O_{2}, in its large dihedral angle, which approaches 90° and C_{2} symmetry. This geometry conforms with the predictions of VSEPR theory.

Dioxygen difluoride's structure

The bonding within dioxygen difluoride has been the subject of considerable speculation, particularly because of the very short O−O distance and the long O−F distances. The O−O bond length is within 2 pm of the 120.7 pm distance for the O=O double bond in the dioxygen molecule, O_{2}. Several bonding systems have been proposed to explain this, including an O−O triple bond with O−F single bonds destabilised and lengthened by repulsion between the lone pairs on the fluorine atoms and the π orbitals of the O−O bond. Repulsion involving the fluorine lone pairs is also responsible for the long and weak covalent bonding in the fluorine molecule.

Computational chemistry indicates that dioxygen difluoride has an exceedingly high barrier to rotation of 81.17 kJ/mol around the O−O bond (in hydrogen peroxide the barrier is 29.45 kJ/mol); this is close to the O−F bond disassociation energy of 81.59 kJ/mol.

The ^{19}F NMR chemical shift of dioxygen difluoride is 865 ppm, which is by far the highest chemical shift recorded for a fluorine nucleus, thus underlining the extraordinary electronic properties of this compound. Despite its instability, thermochemical data for O_{2}F_{2} have been compiled.

== Reactivity ==
The compound readily decomposes into oxygen and fluorine. Even at a temperature of −160 °C (113 K), 4% decomposes each day by this process:

O_{2}F_{2} → O_{2} + F_{2}

The other main property of this unstable compound is its oxidizing power, although most experimental reactions have been conducted near −100 °C (173 K). Several experiments with the compound resulted in a series of fires and explosions. Some of the compounds that produced violent reactions with O_{2}F_{2} include ethyl alcohol, methane, ammonia, and even water ice.

With BF_{3} and PF_{5}, it gives the corresponding dioxygenyl salts:

2 O_{2}F_{2} + 2 PF_{5} → 2 [O_{2}]^{+}[PF_{6}]^{−} + F_{2}

== Uses ==
The compound currently has no practical applications, but has been of theoretical interest. Los Alamos National Laboratory used it to synthesize plutonium hexafluoride at unprecedentedly low temperatures, which was significant because previous methods for preparation needed temperatures so high that the plutonium hexafluoride created would decompose rapidly.

== See also ==
- Chlorine trifluoride
- List of chemical compounds with unusual names
- A. G. Streng
