= Oxygen difluoride =

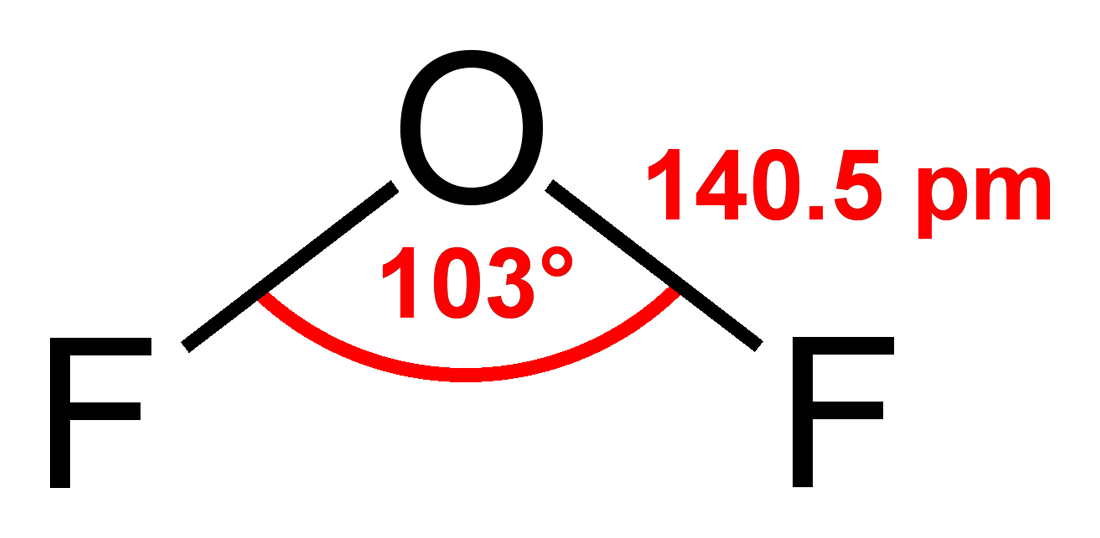
- Structure and dimensions of the oxygen difluoride molecule

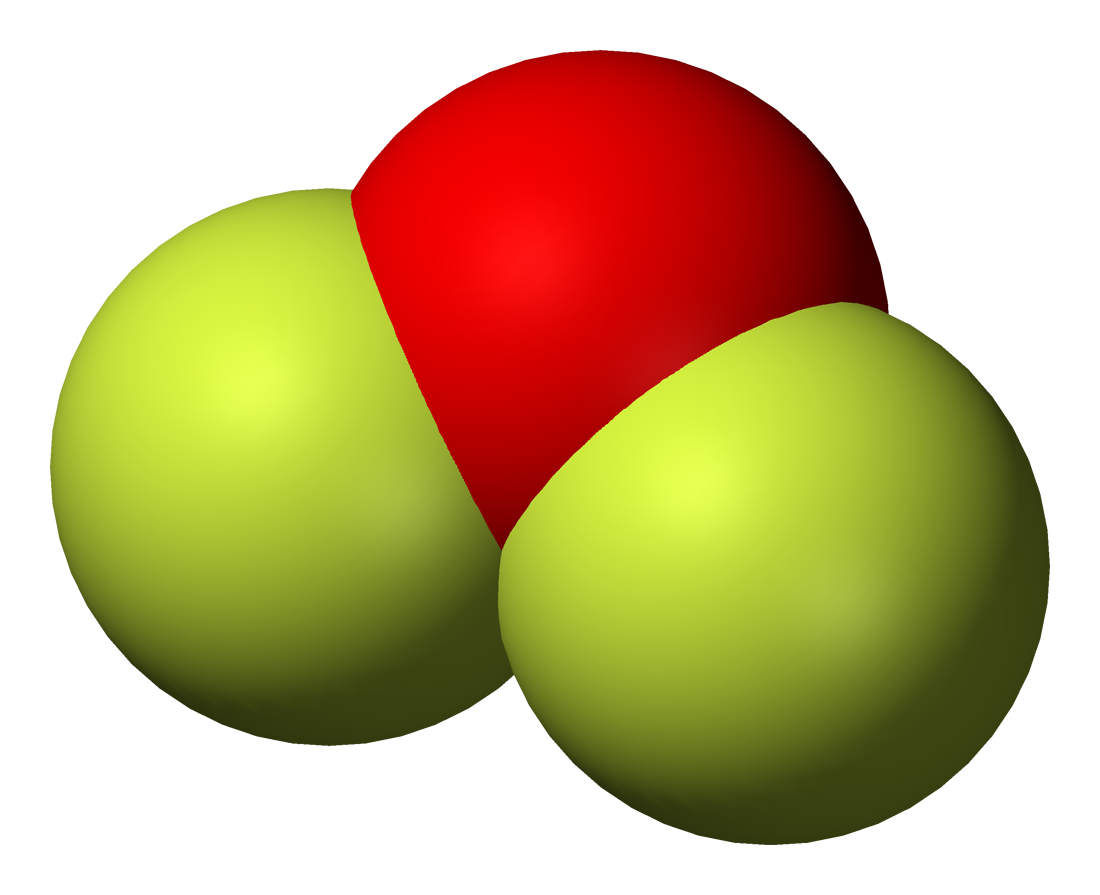
- Space-filling model of the oxygen difluoride molecule

Names
- IUPAC name Oxygen difluoride
- Other names: Oxygen fluoride; Hypofluorous anhydride

Identifiers
CAS Number	7783-41-7
3D model (JSmol)	Interactive image
ChEBI	CHEBI:30494
ChemSpider	22953
ECHA InfoCard	100.029.087
EC Number	231-996-7
PubChem CID	24547
RTECS number	RS2100000
UNII	7BCS2CW398
CompTox Dashboard (EPA)	DTXSID20894009
- InChI: InChI=1S/F2O/c1-3-2 Key: UJMWVICAENGCRF-UHFFFAOYSA-N; InChI=1/F2O/c1-3-2 Key: UJMWVICAENGCRF-UHFFFAOYAI
- SMILES: FOF

Properties
Chemical formula	OF_{2}
Molar mass	53.996 g·mol^{−1}
Appearance	colorless gas, pale yellow/yellowish-brown liquid when condensed, white crystalline solid when frozen
Odor	peculiar, foul
Density	1.90 g/cm^{3} (−224 °C, liquid); 1.719 g/cm^{3} (−183 °C, liquid); 1.521 g/cm^{3} (liquid at −145 °C); 1.88 g/L (gas at room temperature)
Melting point	−223.8 °C (−370.8 °F; 49.3 K)
Boiling point	−144.75 °C (−228.55 °F; 128.40 K)
Solubility in water	hydrolyzes slowly
Vapor pressure	48.9 atm (at −58.0 °C or −72.4 °F or 215.2 K (Note: This is its critical temperature, which is below ordinary room temperature.))

Structure
Point group	C_{2V}

Thermochemistry
Heat capacity (C)	43.3 J/mol K
Std molar entropy (S^{⦵}_{298})	247.46 J/mol K
Std enthalpy of formation (Δ_{f}H^{⦵}_{298})	24.5 kJ mol^{−1}
Gibbs free energy (Δ_{f}G^{⦵})	41.8 kJ/mol

Hazards
- GHS labelling
Pictograms	(GHS03: Oxidizing) (GHS05: Corrosive) (GHS06: Toxic)
Signal word	Danger
Hazard statements	H270, H314, H330
NFPA 704 (fire diamond)	4 0 3 OX
- Lethal dose or concentration (LD, LC)
LC_{50} (median concentration)	2.6 ppm (rat, 1 hour); 1.5 ppm (mouse, 1 hour); 26 ppm (dog, 1 hour); 16 ppm (monkey, 1 hour)
- NIOSH (US health exposure limits)
PEL (Permissible)	TWA 0.05 ppm (0.1 mg/m^{3})
REL (Recommended)	C 0.05 ppm (0.1 mg/m^{3})
IDLH (Immediate danger)	0.5 ppm

Related compounds
Related compounds	HFO; O_{2}F_{2}; NHF_{2}; NF_{3}; SCl_{2}; H_{2}O; Cl_{2}O; Br_{2}O; I_{2}O
- Except where otherwise noted, data are given for materials in their standard state (at 25 °C [77 °F], 100 kPa). verify (what is ?) Infobox references

Oxygen difluoride is a chemical compound with the formula OF_{2}. As predicted by VSEPR theory, the molecule adopts a bent molecular geometry. It is a strong oxidizer and has attracted attention in rocketry for this reason. With a boiling point of −144.75 °C, OF_{2} is the most volatile (isolable) triatomic compound. The compound is one of many known oxygen fluorides.

== Preparation ==
Oxygen difluoride was first reported in 1929; it was obtained by the electrolysis of molten potassium fluoride and hydrofluoric acid containing small quantities of water. The modern preparation entails the reaction of fluorine with a dilute aqueous solution of sodium hydroxide, with sodium fluoride as a side-product:

2 F_{2} + 2 NaOH → OF_{2} + 2 NaF + H_{2}O

== Structure and bonding ==
It is a covalently bonded molecule with a bent molecular geometry and a F-O-F bond angle of 103 degrees. Its powerful oxidizing properties are suggested by the oxidation number of +2 for the oxygen atom instead of its normal −2.

== Reactions ==
Above 200 °C, OF_{2} decomposes to oxygen and fluorine by a radical mechanism.

2 OF_{2} → O_{2} + 2 F_{2}

OF_{2} reacts with many metals to yield oxides and fluorides. Nonmetals also react: phosphorus reacts with OF_{2} to form PF_{5} and POF_{3}; sulfur gives SO_{2} and SF_{4}; and unusually for a noble gas, xenon reacts (at elevated temperatures) yielding XeF_{4} and xenon oxyfluorides.

Reactions of oxygen difluoride and hydrogen halides or halide salts produce the free halogen. For example:

4 HCl + OF_{2} → 2 HF + H_{2}O + 2 Cl_{2}

Oxygen difluoride reacts with water to form hydrofluoric acid:

OF_{2} + H_{2}O → 2 HF + O_{2}

It can oxidize sulfur dioxide to sulfur trioxide and elemental fluorine:

OF_{2} + SO_{2} → SO_{3} + F_{2}

However, in the presence of UV radiation, the products are sulfuryl fluoride (SO_{2}F_{2}) and pyrosulfuryl fluoride (S_{2}O_{5}F_{2}):

OF_{2} + 2 SO_{2} → S_{2}O_{5}F_{2}

== Safety ==
Oxygen difluoride is considered an unsafe gas due to its oxidizing properties. It reacts explosively with water, hydrogen sulfide, sulfur tetrafluoride, diborane, nitrogen oxides, nitrosyl fluoride, and charcoal. It also reacts with halogens, reducing agents, adsorbent materials, combustibles, platinum, hydrocarbons, metal oxides, red phosphorus, boron powder, steam, and moist air. The gas is heavier than air, and upon escape from containment, the concentration of OF_{2} in the air quickly becomes hazardous. Hydrofluoric acid, produced by the hydrolysis of OF_{2} with water, is highly corrosive and toxic, capable of causing necrosis, leaching calcium from the bones and causing cardiovascular damage, among a host of other highly toxic effects. Acute poisoning effects from OF_{2} include: pulmonary edema, bleeding lungs, headaches, and skin and eye irritation or burns. Short-term exposure can cause lachrymation (secretion of tears, especially in abnormal abundance). and irritation of the respiratory tract. Chronic exposure to oxygen difluoride, like that of other chemicals that release fluoride ions, can lead to fluorosis and other symptoms of chronic fluoride poisoning. Oxygen difluoride may be associated with kidney damage. The maximum workplace exposure limit is 0.05 ppm.

Fresh air, rest, and immediate medical attention are needed upon inhalation of OF_{2} as the symptoms of lung edema often are not present until a few hours have passed, and they are aggravated by physical effort.

== Popular culture ==
In Robert L. Forward's science fiction novel Camelot 30K, oxygen difluoride was used as a biochemical solvent by fictional life forms living in the solar system's Kuiper belt. While OF_{2} would be a solid at 30 K, the fictional alien lifeforms were described as endothermic, maintaining elevated body temperatures and liquid OF_{2} blood by radiothermal heating.
