= Periodate =

Negatively-charged molecule made of oxygen and iodine

- The metaperiodate ion

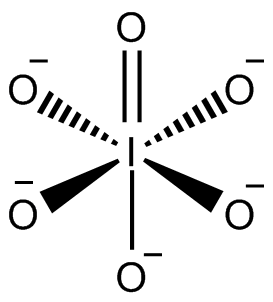
- The orthoperiodate ion

Names
- Systematic IUPAC name tetraoxoiodate(1−) hexaoxoiodate(5−)

Identifiers
CAS Number	15056-35-6 (metaperiodate)
3D model (JSmol)	Metaperiodate: Interactive image; Orthoperiodate: Interactive image
ChemSpider	146311 (metaperiodate); 5256770 (orthoperiodate)
PubChem CID	167232 (metaperiodate); 6857432 (orthoperiodate)
UNII	B45A1BUM4Q (metaperiodate)
- InChI: metaperiodate: InChI=1S/HIO4/c2-1(3,4)5/h(H,2,3,4,5)/p-1 Key: KHIWWQKSHDUIBK-UHFFFAOYSA-M; orthoperiodate: InChI=1S/H5IO6/c2-1(3,4,5,6)7/h(H5,2,3,4,5,6,7)/p-5 Key: TWLXDPFBEPBAQB-UHFFFAOYSA-I
- SMILES: Metaperiodate: [O-][I+3]([O-])([O-])[O-]; Orthoperiodate: [O-][I+]([O-])([O-])([O-])([O-])[O-]

Properties
Chemical formula	IO^{−}_{4} or IO^{5−}_{6}
Conjugate acid	Periodic acid

Related compounds
Other anions	Perchlorate; Perbromate; Permanganate
- Except where otherwise noted, data are given for materials in their standard state (at 25 °C [77 °F], 100 kPa). Infobox references

Periodate (/pəˈraɪ.ədeɪt/ pə-RY-ə-dayt) is an anion composed of iodine and oxygen. It is one of a number of oxyanions of iodine and is the highest in the series, with iodine existing in oxidation state +7. Unlike other perhalogenates, such as perchlorate, it can exist in two forms: metaperiodate IO^{−}_{4} and orthoperiodate IO^{5−}_{6}. In this regard it is comparable to the tellurate ion from the adjacent group. It can combine with a number of counter ions to form periodates, which may also be regarded as the salts of periodic acid.

Periodates were discovered by Heinrich Gustav Magnus and C. F. Ammermüller; who first synthesised periodic acid in 1833.

== Synthesis ==
Classically, periodate was most commonly produced in the form of sodium hydrogen periodate (Na_{3}H_{2}IO_{6}). This is commercially available, but can also be produced by the oxidation of iodates with chlorine and sodium hydroxide. Or, similarly, from iodides by oxidation with bromine and sodium hydroxide:

$$\ce{\overset{sodium\ iodate}{NaIO3} + Cl2{} + 4 NaOH -> Na3H2IO6{} + 2NaCl{} + H2O}$$
$$\ce{NaI + 4 Br2 + 10 NaOH -> Na3H2IO6 + 8 NaBr + 4 H2O}$$

Modern industrial scale production involves the electrochemical oxidation of iodates, on a lead dioxide (PbO_{2}) anode, with the following standard electrode potential:

$\ce{H5IO6 + H+ + 2e- -> IO3- + 3 H2O}$ E° = 1.6 V

Metaperiodates are typically prepared by the dehydration of sodium hydrogen periodate with nitric acid, or by dehydrating orthoperiodic acid by heating it to 100 °C under vacuum.

$$\ce{Na3H2IO6 + 2 HNO3 -> NaIO4 + 2 NaNO3 + 2 H2O}$$
$$\ce{H5IO6 -> HIO4 + 2 H2O}$$

They can also be generated directly from iodates by treatment with other strong oxidizing agents such as hypochlorites:

$$\ce{NaIO3{} + \overset{sodium\ hypochlorite}{NaOCl} -> NaIO4{} + NaCl}$$

=== Forms and interconversion ===
Periodate can exist in a variety of forms in aqueous media, with pH being a controlling factor. Orthoperiodate has a number of acid dissociation constants.

$\ce{H5IO6 <=> H4IO6- + H+}$ pK_{a} = 3.29
$\ce{H4IO6- <=> H3IO6^2- + H+}$ pK_{a} = 8.31
$\ce{H3IO6^2- <=> H2IO6^3- + H+}$ pK_{a} = 11.60

The ortho- and metaperiodate forms also exist in equilibrium.

$\ce{H4IO6- <=> IO4- + 2 H2O}$ K = 29

For this reason orthoperiodate is sometimes referred to as the dihydrate of metaperiodate, written IO^{−}_{4}·2H_{2}O; however, this description is not strictly accurate as X-ray crystallography of H_{5}IO_{6} shows 5 equivalent I−OH groups.

At extremes of pH additional species can form. Under basic conditions a dehydration reaction can take place to form the diperiodate (sometimes referred to as mesoperiodate).

$\ce{2H3IO6^2- <=> H2I2O10^4- + 2 H2O}$ K = 820

Under strongly acidic conditions periodic acid can be protonated to give the orthoperiodonium cation.

$\ce{H6IO6+ <=> H5IO6 + H+}$ pK_{a} = −0.8

== Structure and bonding ==
In both the ortho- and metaperiodate the iodine is hypervalent, as it forms more bonds than would classically be allowed. This has been explained in terms of dative bonds, confirming the absence of double bonding in these molecules.

Exact structures vary depending on counter ions, however on average orthoperiodates adopt a slightly deformed octahedral geometry with X-ray diffraction showing I–O bond lengths of 1.89 Å. Metaperiodates adopt a distorted tetrahedral geometry with an average I–O distance of 1.78 Å.

== Reactions ==
=== Cleavage reactions ===
Periodates can cleave carbon–carbon bonds on a variety of 1,2-difunctionalised alkanes. The most common example of this is diol cleavage, which was also the first to be discovered (Malaprade reaction). In addition to diols, periodates can cleave 1,2-hydroxy ketones, 1,2-diketones, α-keto acids, α-hydroxy acids, amino acids, 1,2-amino alcohols, and 1,2-diamines, to give aldehydes, ketones, and carboxylic acids. In the presence of strong acid catalyst, like H_{2}SO_{4} or HNO_{3} epoxides are also converted into aldehyde or ketones or dicarbonyl compounds.

Alkenes can also be oxidised and cleaved in the Lemieux–Johnson oxidation. This uses a catalytic loading of osmium tetroxide which is regenerated in situ by the periodate. The overall process is equivalent to that of ozonolysis.

Cleavage reactions proceed via a cyclic intermediate called a periodate ester. The formation of this may be affected by pH and temperature but is most strongly affected by the geometry of the substrate, with cis-diols reacting significantly faster than trans-diols. The reactions are exothermic and are typically performed at 0 °C. As periodate salts are only readily soluble in water reactions are generally performed in aqueous media. Where solubility is an issue periodic acid may be used, as this is soluble in alcohols; phase transfer catalysts are also effective in biphasic reaction mixtures. In extreme cases the periodate may be exchanged for lead tetraacetate which reacts in a similar manner and is soluble in organic solvents (Criegee oxidation).

Periodate cleavage is often utilized in molecular biochemistry for the purposes of modifying saccharide rings, as many five- and six-membered sugars have vicinal diols. Historically it was also used to determine the structure of monosaccharides.

Periodate cleavage may be performed on an industrial scale to form dialdehyde starch which has uses in paper production.

=== Oxidation reactions ===
Periodates are powerful oxidising agents. They can oxidise catechol to 1,2-benzoquinone and hydroquinone to 1,4-benzoquinone. Sulfides can be effectively oxidised to sulfoxides. Periodates are sufficiently powerful to generate other strong inorganic oxidisers such as permanganate, osmium tetroxide and ruthenium tetroxide.

=== Niche uses ===
Periodates are highly selective etchants for certain ruthenium-based oxides.

Several staining agents use in microscopy are based around periodate (e.g. periodic acid–Schiff stain and Jones' stain).

Periodates have also been used as oxidising agents for use in pyrotechnics. In 2013 the US Army announced that it would replace the environmentally harmful chemicals barium nitrate and potassium perchlorate with sodium metaperiodate for use in their tracer ammunition.

== Other oxyanions ==
Periodate is part of a series of oxyanions in which iodine can assume oxidation states of −1, +1, +3, +5, or +7. A number of neutral iodine oxides are also known.

Iodine oxidation state	−1	+1	+3	+5	+7
Name	iodide	hypoiodite	iodite	iodate	periodate
Formula	I^{−}	IO^{−}	IO^{−}_{2}	IO^{−}_{3}	IO^{−}_{4} or IO^{5−}_{6}
Structure	The iodide ion	The hypoiodite ion		The iodate ion	The orthoperiodate ion The metaperiodate ion

== See also ==
- Sodium periodate
- Potassium periodate
- Periodic acid
