= Titanium(IV) acetate =

Names
- Other names: Titanium tetraacetate

Identifiers
CAS Number	13057-42-6
3D model (JSmol)	Interactive image
ChemSpider	8141204
EC Number	235-944-4
PubChem CID	59044991
CompTox Dashboard (EPA)	DTXSID30926800
- InChI: InChI=1S/4C2H4O2.Ti/c4*1-2(3)4;/h4*1H3,(H,3,4); Key: INNSZZHSFSFSGS-UHFFFAOYSA-N
- SMILES: CC(=O)O.CC(=O)O.CC(=O)O.CC(=O)O.[Ti]

Properties
Chemical formula	Ti(C_{2}H_{3}O_{2})_{4}
Molar mass	284.06 g/mol
Appearance	colorless
Melting point	117 °C (243 °F; 390 K)

Related compounds
Other cations	Zirconium(IV) acetate
- Except where otherwise noted, data are given for materials in their standard state (at 25 °C [77 °F], 100 kPa). Infobox references

Titanium(IV) acetate or titanium tetraacetate is a coordination complex and white chloroform soluble solid with the formula Ti(C_{2}H_{3}O_{2})_{4}. Crystallographic evidence has not been presented. It can be prepared by reacting tetramethyltitanium with acetic acid.

== History ==
Titanium(IV) acetate has been discussed in archaic literature, well before the advent of X-ray crystallography and an appreciation of the structural trends in metal carboxylate complexes. A variety of titanium oxo acetates were prepared by reactions of titanium alkoxides and acetic acid.

== Uses ==
Species claimed to be titanium(IV) acetate have been used in the production of bismuth titanate ferroelectric thin films. Titanium(IV) acetate is used in the step of making the acetate-derived solutions. The acetate derived solutions were created by blending acetic acid and bismuth acetate together and adding titanium(IV) acetate. "Titanium(IV) acetate" is a substitute for antimony potassium tartrate(emetic tartar) when making red and brown dyes.

== Related compounds ==
Ti(IV) complexes containing only carboxylate ligands have eluded crystallographic characterization, but various polycarboxylate species are known. One example is [Ti(edta)(OH2)].
