= Glycol cleavage =

Type of organic chemistry oxidation

Glycol cleavage is a specific type of organic chemistry oxidation. The carbon–carbon bond in a vicinal diol (glycol) is cleaved and instead the two oxygen atoms become double-bonded to their respective carbon atoms. Depending on the substitution pattern in the diol, these carbonyls will be ketones and/or aldehydes.

Glycol cleavage is an important for determining the structures of sugars. After cleavage of the glycol, the ketone and aldehyde fragments can be inspected and the location of the former hydroxyl groups ascertained.

== Reagents ==
Iodine-based reagents such as periodic acid (HIO_{4}) and (diacetoxyiodo)benzene (PhI(OAc)_{2}) are commonly used. Another reagent is lead tetraacetate (Pb(OAc)_{4}). These I- and Pb-based methods are called the Malaprade reaction and Criegee oxidation, respectively. The former is favored for aqueous solutions, the latter for nonaqueous solutions.

Cyclic intermediate are invariably invoked. The ring then fragments, with cleavage of the carbon–carbon bond and formation of carbonyl groups.

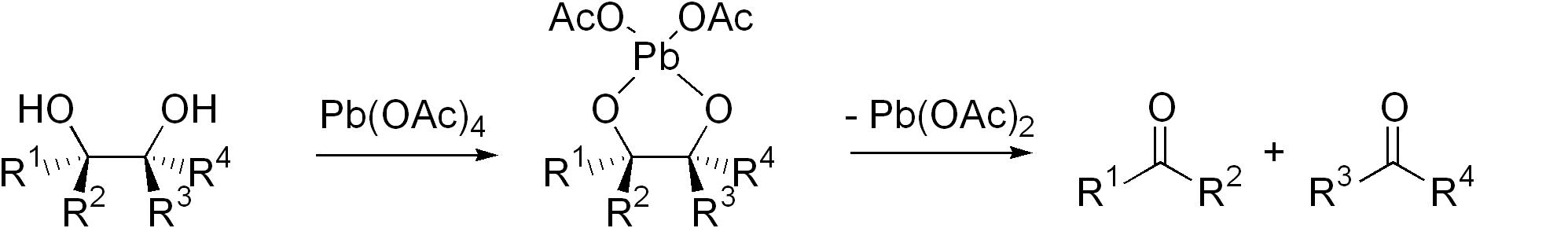
Glycol cleavage with Pb(OAc)_{4} involves a cyclic intermediate.

Warm concentrated potassium permanganate (KMnO_{4}) will react with an alkene to form a glycol. Following this dihydroxylation, the KMnO_{4} can then cleave the glycol to give aldehydes or ketones. The aldehydes will react further with (KMnO_{4}), being oxidized to become carboxylic acids. Controlling the temperature, concentration of the reagent and the pH of the solution can keep the reaction from continuing past the formation of the glycol.
