= Thulium iodate =

Identifiers
CAS Number	14723-97-8 anhydrous; 54172-03-1 dihydrate
3D model (JSmol)	Interactive image
ChemSpider	20082419
EC Number	238-770-7
PubChem CID	21149360
CompTox Dashboard (EPA)	DTXSID30163632
- InChI: InChI=1S/3HIO3.Tm/c3*2-1(3)4;/h3*(H,2,3,4);/q;;;+3/p-3 Key: BSUUCDACXQTNMW-UHFFFAOYSA-K
- SMILES: [Tm+3].O=I(=O)[O-].O=I(=O)[O-].O=I(=O)[O-]

Properties
Chemical formula	Tm(IO_{3})_{3}
Molar mass	693.64
Appearance	gray-white
- Except where otherwise noted, data are given for materials in their standard state (at 25 °C [77 °F], 100 kPa). Infobox references

Thulium iodate is an inorganic compound with the chemical formula Tm(IO_{3})_{3}. It can be prepared by the hydrothermal reaction of periodic acid and thulium periodate in water at 160 °C. Its crystals can also be crystallized in boiling nitric acid. Its solubility in water at 25 °C is 1.467±0.001 10^{−3} mol·dm^{−3}). Adding dimethyl sulfoxide to water will reduce the solubility.
