= Barium sulfite =

- Structure of barium sulfite

Names
- IUPAC name Barium sulfite

Identifiers
CAS Number	7787-39-5
3D model (JSmol)	Interactive image
ChemSpider	450991
ECHA InfoCard	100.029.193
PubChem CID	6096951
UNII	D71W8VF49C
CompTox Dashboard (EPA)	DTXSID00228489
- InChI: InChI=1S/Ba.H2O3S/c;1-4(2)3/h;(H2,1,2,3)/q+2;/p-2 Key: ARSLNKYOPNUFFY-UHFFFAOYSA-L; InChI=1/Ba.H2O3S/c;1-4(2)3/h;(H2,1,2,3)/q+2;/p-2 Key: ARSLNKYOPNUFFY-NUQVWONBAA
- SMILES: [Ba+2].[O-]S([O-])=O

Properties
Chemical formula	BaSO_{3}
Molar mass	217.38 g·mol^{−1}
Appearance	white monoclinic crystals
Density	4.44 g/cm^{3}
Melting point	decomposes
Solubility in water	0.0011 g/100 mL

Related compounds
Other anions	Barium sulfate; Barium fluoride; Barium chloride; Barium bromide; Barium iodide
Other cations	Calcium sulfite; Magnesium sulfite
- Except where otherwise noted, data are given for materials in their standard state (at 25 °C [77 °F], 100 kPa). verify (what is ?) Infobox references

Barium sulfite is the inorganic compound with the chemical formula BaSO_{3}. It is a white powder that finds few applications.

== Occurrence ==
It is an intermediate in the carbothermal reduction of barium sulfate to barium sulfide:

BaSO_{4} + CO → BaSO_{3} + CO_{2}

It also occurs as an intermediate phase in the aqueous oxidation of BaS to BaSO_{4} by weathering in slag.

== Uses ==
Barium sulfite is used in the hydrolysis of dialdehyde starch by sulfurous acid yielding glyoxal and erythrose. The barium sulfite complexes with the glyoxal, allowing for higher reagent concentrations without loss of yield.
