= Halous acid =

A halous acid, also known as a halogenous acid, is an oxyacid consisting of a halogen atom in the +3 oxidation state single-bonded to a hydroxyl group and double-bonded to an oxygen atom. Examples include chlorous acid, bromous acid, and iodous acid. The conjugate base is a halite.

== Synthesis ==
One method is to add oxygen to the corresponding hypohalous acid. This can be done with another hypohalous acid—or even the same one.

HBrO + HClO → HBrO_{2} + HCl
2 HBrO → HBrO_{2} + HBr

The latter is a disproportionation reaction.

Another method of oxidizing hypobromous acid can be used:

HBrO + H_{2}O - 2e^{−} → HBrO_{2} + 2H^{+}

The oxidized bromine-containing acid need not contain oxygen originally, as in this comproportionation reaction:

2 HBrO_{3} + HBr → 3 HBrO_{2}

Bromous acid was originally prepared using another method of adding oxygen to hypobromous acid, where the free oxygen was freed from water when the free hydrogen was taken by NO_{3} (to form nitric acid) that was freed from silver nitrate when the silver was taken by elemental bromine to form silver bromide.

2 AgNO_{3} + HBrO + Br_{2} + H_{2}O → HBrO_{2} + 2 AgBr

Chlorous acid may be generated from salts of the conjugate base, chlorite, which is more stable than chlorous acid.

Ba(ClO_{2})_{2} + H_{2}SO_{4} → BaSO_{4} + 2 HClO_{2}

== Stability ==
Chlorous acid, bromous acid, and iodous acid are all unstable. Chlorous acid is the only isolatable halous acid, and while it has stable salts, they tend to decompose rapidly, some even explosively, upon heating. Neither bromous acid nor iodous acid has ever been isolated, and while a few salts of bromous acid have been isolated, the same is not true for iodous acid.

One method of decomposition of halous acids is disproportionating to the corresponding hypohalous acid and halic acid:

2 HClO_{2} → HClO + HClO_{3}
2 HBrO_{2} → HBrO_{3} + HOBr

In acidic solutions, chlorous acid tends to decompose via another disproportionation reaction:

5 HClO_{2} → 4 ClO_{2} + HCl + 2 H_{2}O
