= Halite (disambiguation) =

Halite is the mineral form of sodium chloride.

Halite may also refer to:

- Halite (oxyanion), also known as a halogenite
- Central Sofia Market Hall, in Sofia, Bulgaria
