= Sodium periodate =

Names
- IUPAC name Sodium periodate
- Other names Sodium metaperiodate

Identifiers
CAS Number	meta: 7790-28-5; para: 13940-38-0; trihydrogen: 15599-97-0
3D model (JSmol)	meta: Interactive image; para: Interactive image; ortho: Interactive image; trihydrogen: Interactive image
ChEBI	meta: CHEBI:75226
ChemSpider	meta: 58683; para: 7971889; trihydrogen: 129318857
ECHA InfoCard	100.029.270
EC Number	meta: 232-197-6; para: 237-720-1; trihydrogen: 239-681-6
PubChem CID	meta: 23667635; para: 9796123; ortho: 21982945; trihydrogen: 22765006
RTECS number	meta: SD4550000
UNII	meta: 98W4A29X43
CompTox Dashboard (EPA)	meta: DTXSID30894075
- InChI: InChI=1S/HIO4.Na/c2-1(3,4)5;/h(H,2,3,4,5);/q;+1/p-1 Key: JQWHASGSAFIOCM-UHFFFAOYSA-M; meta: InChI=1/HIO4.Na/c2-1(3,4)5;/h(H,2,3,4,5);/q;+1/p-1 Key: JQWHASGSAFIOCM-REWHXWOFAO; para: InChI=1S/H5IO6.3Na/c2-1(3,4,5,6)7;;;/h(H5,2,3,4,5,6,7);;;/q;3*+1/p-3 Key: DSYMXPNUZLZKOA-UHFFFAOYSA-K; ortho: InChI=1S/H5IO6.5Na/c2-1(3,4,5,6)7;;;;;/h(H5,2,3,4,5,6,7);;;;;/q;5*+1/p-5 Key: RAJUJHHGBPSUAC-UHFFFAOYSA-I; trihydrogen: InChI=1S/H5IO6.2Na/c2-1(3,4,5,6)7;;/h(H5,2,3,4,5,6,7);;/q;2*+1/p-2 Key: PEPDKRLBEGSBRW-UHFFFAOYSA-L
- SMILES: meta: [O-]I(=O)(=O)=O.[Na+]; para: OI(=O)(O)([O-])([O-])[O-].[Na+].[Na+].[Na+]; ortho: [O-]I(=O)([O-])([O-])([O-])[O-].[Na+].[Na+].[Na+].[Na+].[Na+]; trihydrogen: OI(=O)(O)(O)([O-])[O-].[Na+].[Na+]

Properties
Chemical formula	NaIO_{4}
Molar mass	213.8918 g/mol
Appearance	white crystals
Density	3.865 g/cm^{3} (anhydrous); 3.210 g/cm^{3}
Melting point	300 °C (572 °F; 573 K) (anhydrous); 175 °C (347 °F; 448 K) (trihydrate) (decomposes)
Solubility in water	91 g/L
Solubility	soluble in acids

Structure
Crystal structure	tetragonal (anhydrous) trigonal (trihydrate)

Hazards
NFPA 704 (fire diamond)	2 0 3 OX

Related compounds
Other anions	sodium perchlorate, sodium perbromate
Other cations	potassium periodate, periodic acid
- Except where otherwise noted, data are given for materials in their standard state (at 25 °C [77 °F], 100 kPa). verify (what is ?) Infobox references

Sodium periodate is an inorganic salt, composed of a sodium cation and the periodate anion. It may also be regarded as the sodium salt of periodic acid. Like many periodates, it can exist in two different forms: sodium metaperiodate (formula‍ NaIO_{4}) and sodium orthoperiodate (normally Na_{2}H_{3}IO_{6}, but sometimes the fully reacted salt Na_{5}IO_{6}). Both salts are useful oxidizing agents.

== Preparation ==
Classically, periodate was produced in the form of sodium hydrogen periodate (Na_{3}H_{2}IO_{6}). This commercially available, but can also be produced by the oxidation of iodates with chlorine and sodium hydroxide. Or, similarly, from iodides by oxidation with bromine and sodium hydroxide:

NaIO_{3} + Cl_{2} + 4 NaOH → Na_{3}H_{2}IO_{6} + 2NaCl + H_{2}O
NaI + 4 Br_{2} + 10 NaOH → Na_{3}H_{2}IO_{6} + 8 NaBr + 4 H_{2}O

Modern industrial scale production involves the electrochemical oxidation of iodates, on a lead dioxide (PbO_{2}) anode, with the following standard electrode potential:

H_{5}IO_{6} + H^{+} + 2e^{−} → IO^{−}_{3} + 3 H_{2}O E° = 1.6 V

Sodium metaperiodate can be prepared by the dehydration of sodium hydrogen periodate with a strong mineral acid, such as nitric acid:

Na_{3}H_{2}IO_{6} + 2 HNO_{3} → NaIO_{4} + 2 NaNO_{3} + 2 H_{2}O

== Structure ==
Sodium metaperiodate (NaIO_{4}) forms tetragonal crystals (space group I4_{1}/_{a}) consisting of slightly distorted IO^{−}_{4} ions with average I–O bond distances of 1.775 Å; the Na^{+} ions are surrounded by 8 oxygen atoms at distances of 2.54 and 2.60 Å.

Sodium hydrogen periodate (Na_{2}H_{3}IO_{6}) forms orthorhombic crystals (space group Pnnm). Iodine and sodium atoms are both surrounded by an octahedral arrangement of 6 oxygen atoms; however the NaO_{6} octahedron is strongly distorted. IO_{6} and NaO_{6} groups are linked via common vertices and edges.

Powder diffraction indicates that Na_{5}IO_{6} crystallises in the monoclinic system (space group C2/m).

== Uses ==
Sodium periodate can be used in solution to open saccharide rings between vicinal diols leaving two aldehyde groups. This process is often used in labeling saccharides with fluorescent molecules or other tags such as biotin. Because the process requires vicinal diols, periodate oxidation is often used to selectively label the 3′-ends of RNA (ribose has vicinal diols) instead of DNA as deoxyribose does not have vicinal diols.

NaIO_{4} is used in organic chemistry to cleave diols to produce two aldehydes.

In 2013 the US Army announced that it would replace environmentally harmful chemicals barium nitrate and potassium perchlorate with sodium metaperiodate for use in their tracer ammunition.

== See also ==
- lead tetraacetate - also effective for diol cleavage via the Criegee oxidation
