= Lithium periodate =

Inorganic compound of lithium, iodine, and oxygen

Names
- Preferred IUPAC name Lithium periodate

Identifiers
CAS Number	21111-84-2
3D model (JSmol)	Interactive image
ChemSpider	8352051
EC Number	237-365-2
PubChem CID	23711816
CompTox Dashboard (EPA)	DTXSID40635774
- InChI: InChI=1S/HIO4.Li/c2-1(3,4)5;/h(H,2,3,4,5);/q;+1/p-1 Key: SYWXNZXEJFSLEU-UHFFFAOYSA-M
- SMILES: [Li+].[O-]I(=O)(=O)=O

Properties
Chemical formula	ILiO_{4}
Molar mass	197.84 g·mol^{−1}
Appearance	white powder
Melting point	370 °C (698 °F; 643 K)
Solubility in water	soluble

Hazards
- GHS labelling
Hazard statements	H272, H315, H319, H335, H360

Related compounds
Related compounds	Sodium periodate Lithium perchlorate
- Except where otherwise noted, data are given for materials in their standard state (at 25 °C [77 °F], 100 kPa). Infobox references

Lithium periodate is an inorganic compound of lithium, iodine, and oxygen with the chemical formula LiIO_{4}.

== Physical properties ==
The compound forms a white powder. It also forms hydrates and is soluble in water.
