= Ammonium periodate =

Names
- IUPAC name azanium;periodate
- Other names Ammonium tetraoxoiodate(VII)

Identifiers
CAS Number	13446-11-2
3D model (JSmol)	Interactive image
ChemSpider	8096374
PubChem CID	9920739
CompTox Dashboard (EPA)	DTXSID60432823
- InChI: InChI=1S/HIO4.H3N/c2-1(3,4)5;/h(H,2,3,4,5);1H3 Key: URGYLQKORWLZAQ-UHFFFAOYSA-N
- SMILES: [NH4+].[O-]I(=O)(=O)=O

Properties
Chemical formula	H_{4}INO_{4}
Molar mass	208.939 g·mol^{−1}
Appearance	colorless crystals
Density	3.056 g/cm^{3}
Solubility in water	soluble

Hazards
- GHS labelling
Pictograms	(GHS03: Oxidizing) (GHS08: Health hazard)
- Except where otherwise noted, data are given for materials in their standard state (at 25 °C [77 °F], 100 kPa). Infobox references

Ammonium periodate is a chemical compound with the chemical formula NH_{4}IO_{4}.

== Synthesis ==
Ammonium periodate is formed by the reaction of periodic acid and ammonia solution:

HIO_{4} + NH_{4}OH → NH_{4}IO_{4} + H_{2}O

== Physical properties ==
The compound forms colorless crystals of tetragonal system, spatial group I41/a, cell parameters a = 0.5938 nm, c = 1.2790 nm, Z = 4.

It is sparingly soluble in water and explodes when heated. The compound is used in analytical chemistry as an oxidizing agent.
