= Gadolinium iodate =

Identifiers
CAS Number	14732-19-5 anhydrous; 54172-06-4 dihydrate
3D model (JSmol)	Interactive image
ChemSpider	20082425
ECHA InfoCard	100.035.251
EC Number	238-792-7
PubChem CID	21149365
CompTox Dashboard (EPA)	DTXSID70163671
- InChI: InChI=1S/Gd.3HIO3/c;3*2-1(3)4/h;3*(H,2,3,4)/q+3;;;/p-3 Key: FQBFRXMMVFCZEX-UHFFFAOYSA-K
- SMILES: [O-]I(=O)=O.[O-]I(=O)=O.[O-]I(=O)=O.[Gd+3]

Properties
Chemical formula	Gd(IO_{3})_{3}
Molar mass	681.96
Appearance	colourless crystals
- Except where otherwise noted, data are given for materials in their standard state (at 25 °C [77 °F], 100 kPa). Infobox references

Gadolinium iodate is an inorganic compound with the chemical formula Gd(IO_{3})_{3}. It is produced by reacting gadolinium metal with periodic acid at 180 °C. Its solubility in water is 0.893±0.002 (25 °C, 103 mol·dm^{−3}). Adding ethanol or methanol to water will reduce the solubility.
