= Potassium periodate =

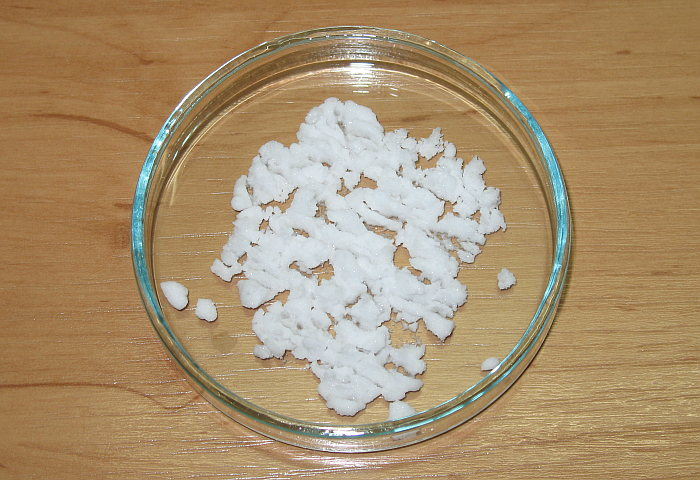

Names
- IUPAC name Potassium periodate
- Other names potassium metaperiodate

Identifiers
CAS Number	7790-21-8
3D model (JSmol)	Interactive image
ChemSpider	128877
ECHA InfoCard	100.029.269
EC Number	232-196-0
PubChem CID	516896
UNII	Q3LOC6P66L
UN number	3085
CompTox Dashboard (EPA)	DTXSID90894076
- InChI: InChI=1S/HIO4.K/c2-1(3,4)5;/h(H,2,3,4,5);/q;+1/p-1 Key: FJVZDOGVDJCCCR-UHFFFAOYSA-M; InChI=1/HIO4.K/c2-1(3,4)5;/h(H,2,3,4,5);/q;+1/p-1 Key: FJVZDOGVDJCCCR-REWHXWOFAS
- SMILES: [K+].[O-]I(=O)(=O)=O

Properties
Chemical formula	KIO_{4}
Molar mass	229.999 g·mol^{−1}
Appearance	colorless tetrahedral crystals
Density	3.618 g/cm^{3}
Melting point	582 °C (1,080 °F; 855 K)
Boiling point	explodes
Solubility in water	0.51 g/100g
Solubility product (K_{sp})	3.71×10^{−4}
Band gap	2.433 eV
Refractive index (n_{D})	1.63

Structure
Crystal structure	tetragonal
Space group	I4_{1}/a
Point group	4/m
Lattice constant	a = 7.669 Å, b = 7.669 Å, c = 7.669 Å α = 135.102°, β = 135.102°, γ = 65.371°
Lattice volume (V)	221.443 Å^{3}
Formula units (Z)	2

Thermochemistry
Std molar entropy (S^{⦵}_{298})	175.7 J⋅mol^{−1}·K^{-1}
Std enthalpy of formation (Δ_{f}H^{⦵}_{298})	−467.2 kJ⋅mol^{−1}
Gibbs free energy (Δ_{f}G^{⦵})	−361.4 kJ⋅mol^{−1}

Hazards
- GHS labelling
Pictograms	(GHS03: Oxidizing) (GHS08: Health hazard) (GHS05: Corrosive) (GHS09: Environmental hazard)
Signal word	Danger
Hazard statements	H271, H314, H372, H400
Precautionary statements	P210, P220, P221, P260, P264, P270, P273, P280, P283, P301+P330+P331, P303+P361+P353, P304+P340+P310, P305+P351+P338+P310, P306+P360, P314, P363, P370+P378, P371+P380+P375, P391, P405, P501
NFPA 704 (fire diamond)	3 1 2 OX

Related compounds
Other anions	Potassium iodide; Potassium iodate
Other cations	Sodium periodate
Related compounds	Periodic acid
- Except where otherwise noted, data are given for materials in their standard state (at 25 °C [77 °F], 100 kPa). verify (what is ?) Infobox references

Potassium periodate is an inorganic salt with the molecular formula KIO_{4}. It is composed of a potassium cation and a periodate anion and may also be regarded as the potassium salt of periodic acid. Note that the pronunciation is per-iodate, not period-ate.

Unlike other common periodates, such as sodium periodate and periodic acid, it is only available in the meta-periodate form; the corresponding potassium ortho-periodate (K_{5}IO_{6}) has never been reported.

== Preparation ==
Potassium periodate can be prepared by the oxidation of an aqueous solution of potassium iodate by chlorine and potassium hydroxide.

KIO_{3} + Cl_{2} + 2 KOH → KIO_{4} + 2 KCl + H_{2}O

It can also be generated by the electrochemical oxidation of potassium iodate, however the low solubility of KIO_{3} makes this approach of limited use.

== Chemical properties ==
Potassium periodate decomposes at 582 °C (1,080 °F) to form potassium iodate and oxygen.

The low solubility of KIO_{4} makes it useful for the determination of potassium and cerium.

On heating (especially with manganese(IV) oxide as catalyst), it decomposes to form potassium iodate, releasing oxygen gas.
