= Iodite =

Ion

Names
- IUPAC name iodite
- Systematic IUPAC name dioxidoiodate(1−)

Identifiers
CAS Number	20499-55-2
3D model (JSmol)	Interactive image
ChemSpider	4574132
PubChem CID	5460637
CompTox Dashboard (EPA)	DTXSID901031417
- InChI: InChI=1S/HIO2/c2-1-3/h(H,2,3)/p-1
- SMILES: [O-][I+][O-]

Properties
Chemical formula	IO^{−}_{2}
Molar mass	158.902 g·mol^{−1}
Conjugate acid	Iodous acid

Related compounds
Other anions	Chlorite; Bromite
- Except where otherwise noted, data are given for materials in their standard state (at 25 °C [77 °F], 100 kPa). Infobox references

The iodite ion, or iodine dioxide anion, is the halite with the chemical formula IO^{−}_{2}. Within the ion, the iodine exists in the oxidation state of +3.

== Iodite anion ==
Iodites (including iodous acid) are highly unstable and have been observed but never isolated. They will rapidly disproportionate to molecular iodine and iodates. However, they have been detected as intermediates in the conversion between iodide and iodate.

== Other oxyanions ==
Iodine can assume oxidation states of −1, +1, +3, +5, or +7. A number of neutral iodine oxides are also known.

Iodine oxidation state	−1	+1	+3	+5	+7
Name	iodide	hypoiodite	iodite	iodate	periodate
Formula	I^{−}	IO^{−}	IO^{−}_{2}	IO^{−}_{3}	IO^{−}_{4} or IO^{5−}_{6}
