= Zirconyl chloride =

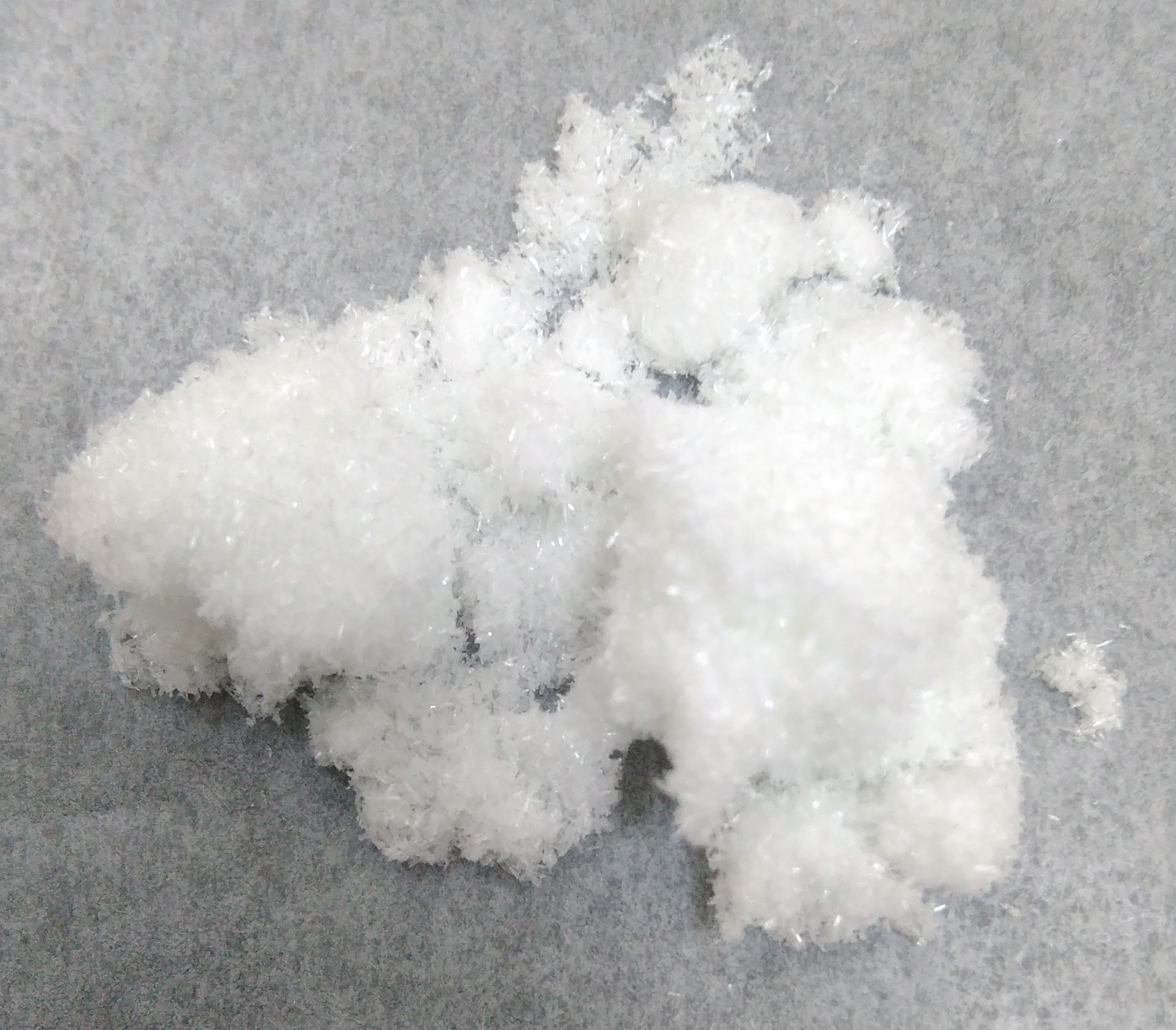

Names
- IUPAC name Dichloro(oxo)zirconium
- Other names: Basic zirconium chloride; Dichlorooxozirconium; Zirconium oxychloride; Zirconium dichloride oxide; Zirconium chloride oxide; Chlorozirconyl

Identifiers
CAS Number	anhydrous: 7699-43-6; octahydrate: 13520-92-8
3D model (JSmol)	Interactive image
ChemSpider	10606302
ECHA InfoCard	100.028.835
EC Number	603-909-6
PubChem CID	159678
UNII	anhydrous: T4294601O7; octahydrate: 2R4A27N98K
CompTox Dashboard (EPA)	DTXSID9049823
- InChI: InChI=1S/2ClH.8H2O.O.Zr/h2*1H;8*1H2;; Key: FUBACIUATZGHAC-UHFFFAOYSA-N
- SMILES: O=[Zr](Cl)Cl

Properties
Chemical formula	Cl_{2}OZr
Molar mass	178.12 g·mol^{−1}
Appearance	White crystals

Hazards
- Lethal dose or concentration (LD, LC)
LD_{50} (median dose)	400 mg kg^{−1}, rat (intraperitioneal)
- Except where otherwise noted, data are given for materials in their standard state (at 25 °C [77 °F], 100 kPa). verify (what is ?) Infobox references

Zirconyl chloride is the inorganic compound with the formula of [Zr_{4}(OH)_{8}(H_{2}O)_{16}]Cl_{8}·12H_{2}O, more commonly written ZrOCl_{2}·8H_{2}O, and referred to as zirconyl chloride octahydrate. It is a white solid and is the most common water-soluble derivative of zirconium. The salt is produced by hydrolysis of zirconium tetrachloride or treating hydrous zirconium oxide with hydrochloric acid. A compound with the formula ZrOCl_{2} has not been characterized.

== Structure ==
It adopts a tetrameric structure, consisting of the cation [Zr_{4}(OH)_{8}(H_{2}O)_{16}]^{8+}. features four pairs of hydroxide bridging ligands linking four Zr^{4+} centers. The chloride anions are not ligands, consistent with the high oxophilicity of Zr(IV). The salt crystallizes as tetragonal crystals.

== See also ==
- Zirconyl acetate
