= Dialdehyde starch =

Identifiers
CAS Number	9047-50-1
ECHA InfoCard	100.127.976
MeSH	Dialdehyde+starch
PubChem CID	24776
CompTox Dashboard (EPA)	DTXSID20925584 DTXSID001010927, DTXSID20925584

Properties
Chemical formula	(C_{6}H_{8}O_{5})_{n}
Appearance	White, opaque crystals
- Except where otherwise noted, data are given for materials in their standard state (at 25 °C [77 °F], 100 kPa). verify (what is ?) Infobox references

Dialdehyde starch is a polysaccharide derived by chemical modification from starch. It is prepared by periodate oxidation of starch. As an aqueous dispersion, it can form a particle gel or a polymer network depending on preparation conditions. Hydrolysis with sulfurous acid yields glyoxal and erythrose.

It has found use in the paper industry, where in it has been shown to improve the wet strength of consumer products like toilet paper and paper towels.
