= Antimony(III) acetate =

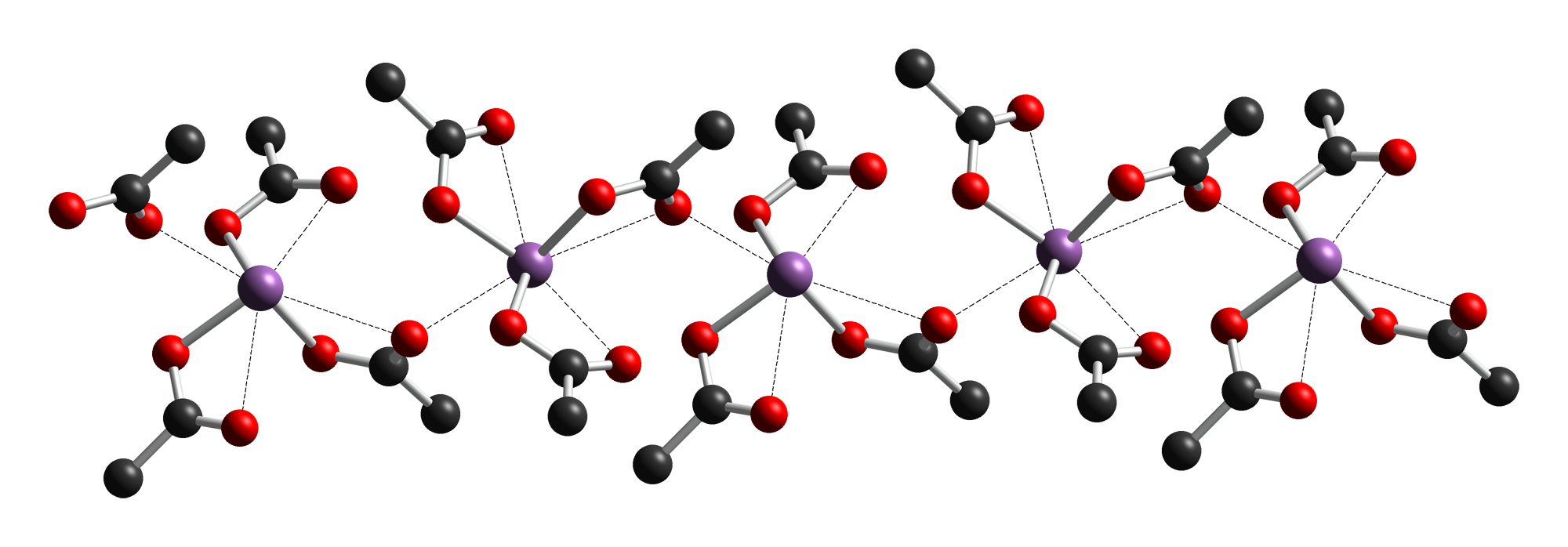
- Antimony(III) acetate

Names
- IUPAC name Antimony(III) acetate
- Other names Antimony triacetate Acetic acid, antimony(3+) salt

Identifiers
CAS Number	6923-52-0
3D model (JSmol)	Interactive image
ChemSpider	21839
ECHA InfoCard	100.027.312
PubChem CID	16685080
RTECS number	AF4200000
UNII	F6Z6EKG4QY
CompTox Dashboard (EPA)	DTXSID3029283
- InChI: InChI=1S/3C2H4O2.Sb/c3*1-2(3)4;/h3*1H3,(H,3,4);/q;;;+3/p-3 Key: JVLRYPRBKSMEBF-UHFFFAOYSA-K; InChI=1/3C2H4O2.Sb.3H/c3*1-2(3)4;;;;/h3*1H3,(H,3,4);;;;/q;;;+3;;;/p-3/r3C2H4O2.H3Sb/c3*1-2(3)4;/h3*1H3,(H,3,4);1H3/q;;;+3/p-3 Key: NSMVVPJZMRQLMR-ZHOQVWKLAW; InChI=1/3C2H4O2.Sb/c3*1-2(3)4;/h3*1H3,(H,3,4);/q;;;+3/p-3 Key: JVLRYPRBKSMEBF-DFZHHIFOAU
- SMILES: O=C(C)O[Sb](OC(C)=O)OC(C)=O

Properties
Chemical formula	Sb(CH_{3}COO)_{3}
Appearance	White powder
Density	1.22 g/cm^{3} (20 °C)
Melting point	128.5 °C (263.3 °F; 401.6 K) (decomposes to Sb_{2}O_{3})

Hazards
NFPA 704 (fire diamond)	1 0 0
- Lethal dose or concentration (LD, LC)
LD_{50} (median dose)	4480 mg/kg (rat)
- NIOSH (US health exposure limits)
PEL (Permissible)	TWA 0.5 mg/m^{3} (as Sb)
REL (Recommended)	TWA 0.5 mg/m^{3} (as Sb)
- Except where otherwise noted, data are given for materials in their standard state (at 25 °C [77 °F], 100 kPa). verify (what is ?) Infobox references

Antimony(III) acetate is the compound of antimony with the chemical formula of Sb(CH_{3}COO)_{3}. It is a white powder, is moderately water-soluble, and is used as a catalyst in the production of polyesters.

== Preparation ==
It can be prepared by the reaction of antimony(III) oxide with acetic anhydride:

Sb_{2}O_{3} + 3 C_{4}H_{6}O_{3} → 2 Sb(CH_{3}COO)_{3}

== Structure ==
The crystal structure of antimony(III) acetate has been determined by X-ray crystallography. It consists of discrete Sb(CH_{3}COO)_{3} monomers with monodentate acetate ligands. The monomers are linked together into chains by weaker C=O···Sb intermolecular interactions.
