= Malaprade reaction =

In organic chemistry, the Malaprade reaction or Malaprade oxidation is a reaction that converts vicinal diols by periodic acid or a periodate salt to give a pair of carbonyl derivatives. The reaction was first reported by Léon Malaprade in 1928. Amino alcohols are also cleaved.

In terms of mechanism, the reaction is assumed to proceed by formation of cyclic diester of iodine(VII).

== See also ==
- Criegee oxidation
