= Bismuth(III) acetate =

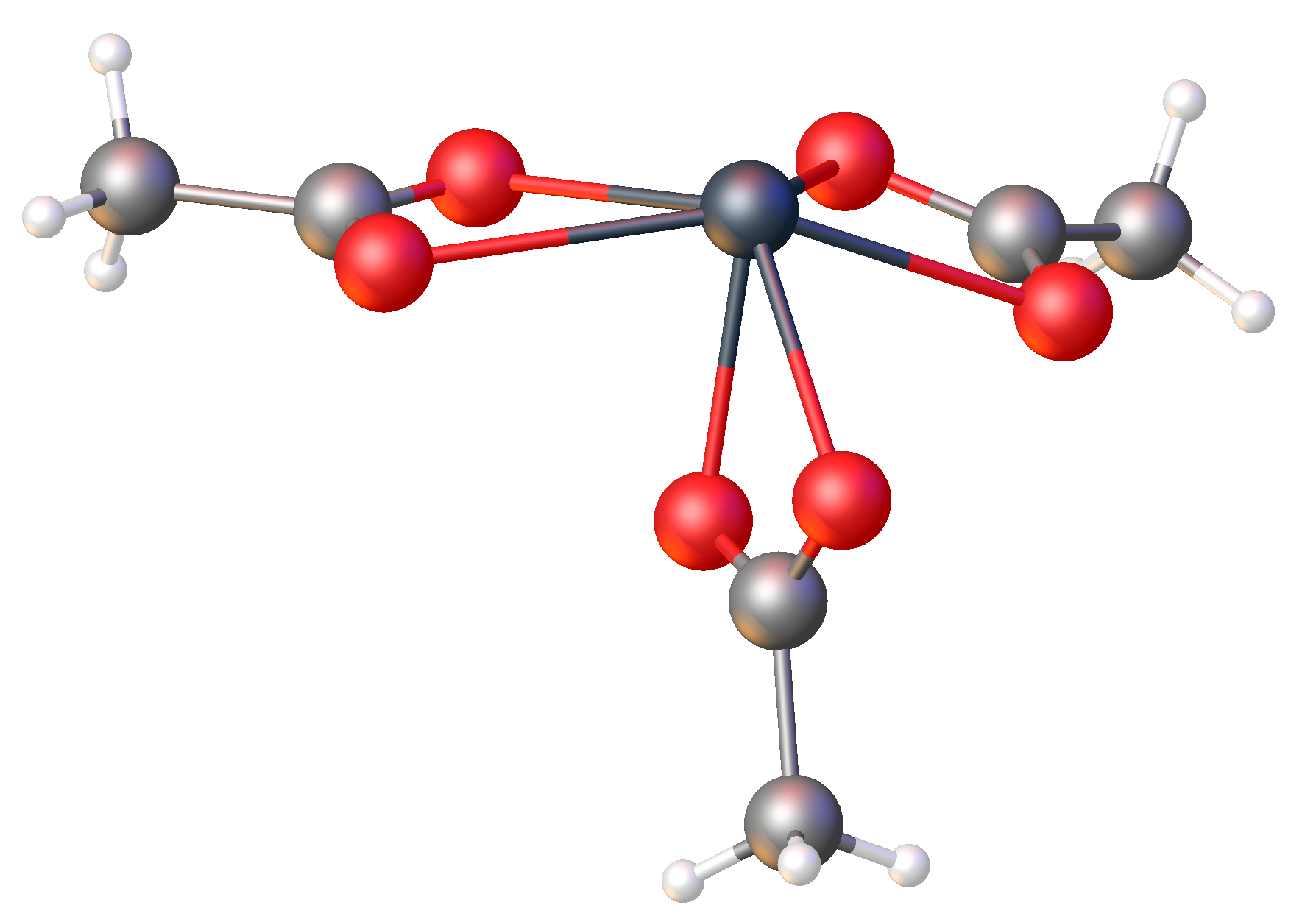

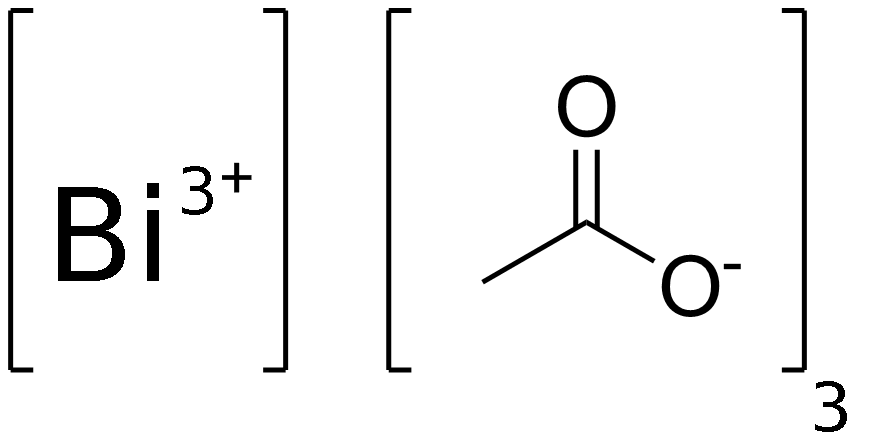

Names
- IUPAC name Bismuth(3+) triacetate
- Other names Bismuth(III) acetate; Bismuth triacetate

Identifiers
CAS Number	22306-37-2
3D model (JSmol)	Interactive image
ChemSpider	28888
ECHA InfoCard	100.040.806
EC Number	249-426-0
PubChem CID	31132
UNII	8AJA86Y692
- InChI: InChI=1S/3C2H4O2.Bi/c3*1-2(3)4;/h3*1H3,(H,3,4);/q;;;+3/p-3 Key: WKLWZEWIYUTZNJ-UHFFFAOYSA-K
- SMILES: CC(=O)[O-].CC(=O)[O-].CC(=O)[O-].[Bi+3]

Properties
Chemical formula	Bi(CH_{3}COO)_{3}
Molar mass	386.112 g/mol
Appearance	White crystals or powder
Density	2.765 g/cm^{3}
Solubility in water	hydrolyzes
- Except where otherwise noted, data are given for materials in their standard state (at 25 °C [77 °F], 100 kPa). Infobox references

Bismuth(III) acetate is the coordination complex with the formula Bi(O_{2}CCH_{3})_{3}. It is a molecular compound featuring Bi bound to six oxygen ligands in a distorted polyhedral sphere. According to X-ray crystallography, the acetate ligands are bound very unsymmetrically such that three Bi-O bonds are approximately 2.3 Å in length, and three others are near 2.6 Å. The stereochemically active lone pair of electrons occupies significant portion of the coordination sphere. The compound has been further characterized by solid-state NMR spectroscopy.

Bismuth(III) acetate will hydrolyze to form basic bismuth acetate precipitates. This reaction is useful to separate lead and bismuth.

Bi(CH_{3}COO)_{3} + H_{2}O → BiOCH_{3}COO + 2 CH_{3}COOH

== See also ==
- Antimony(III) acetate
