= Iodous acid =

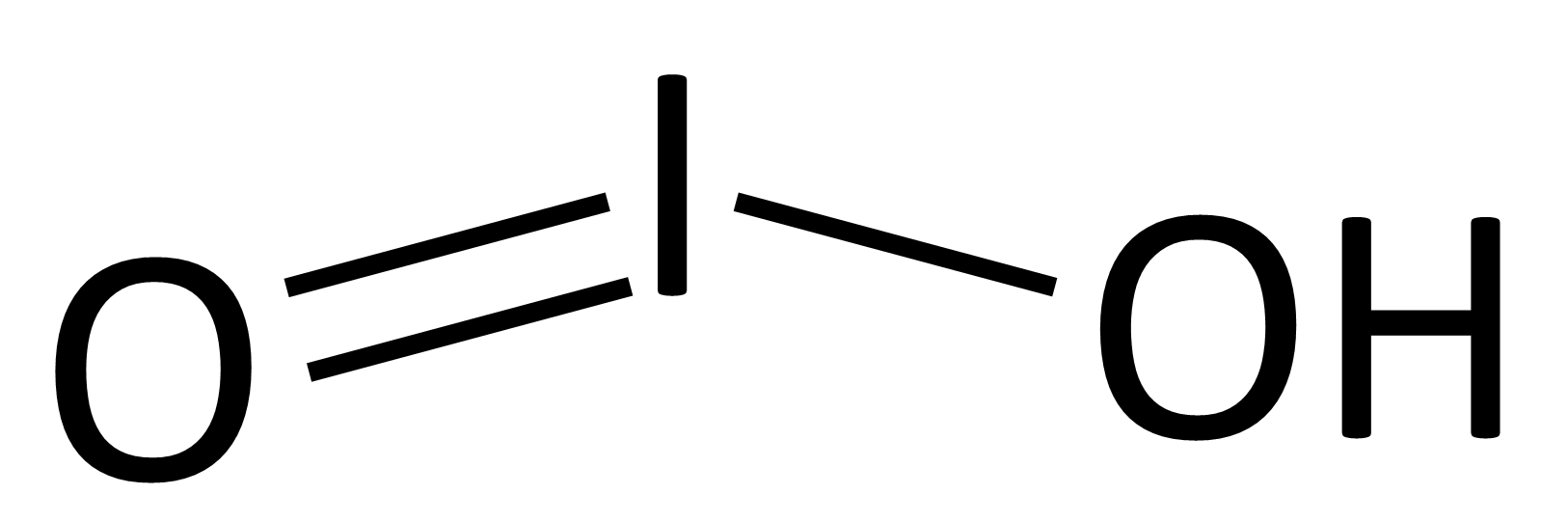

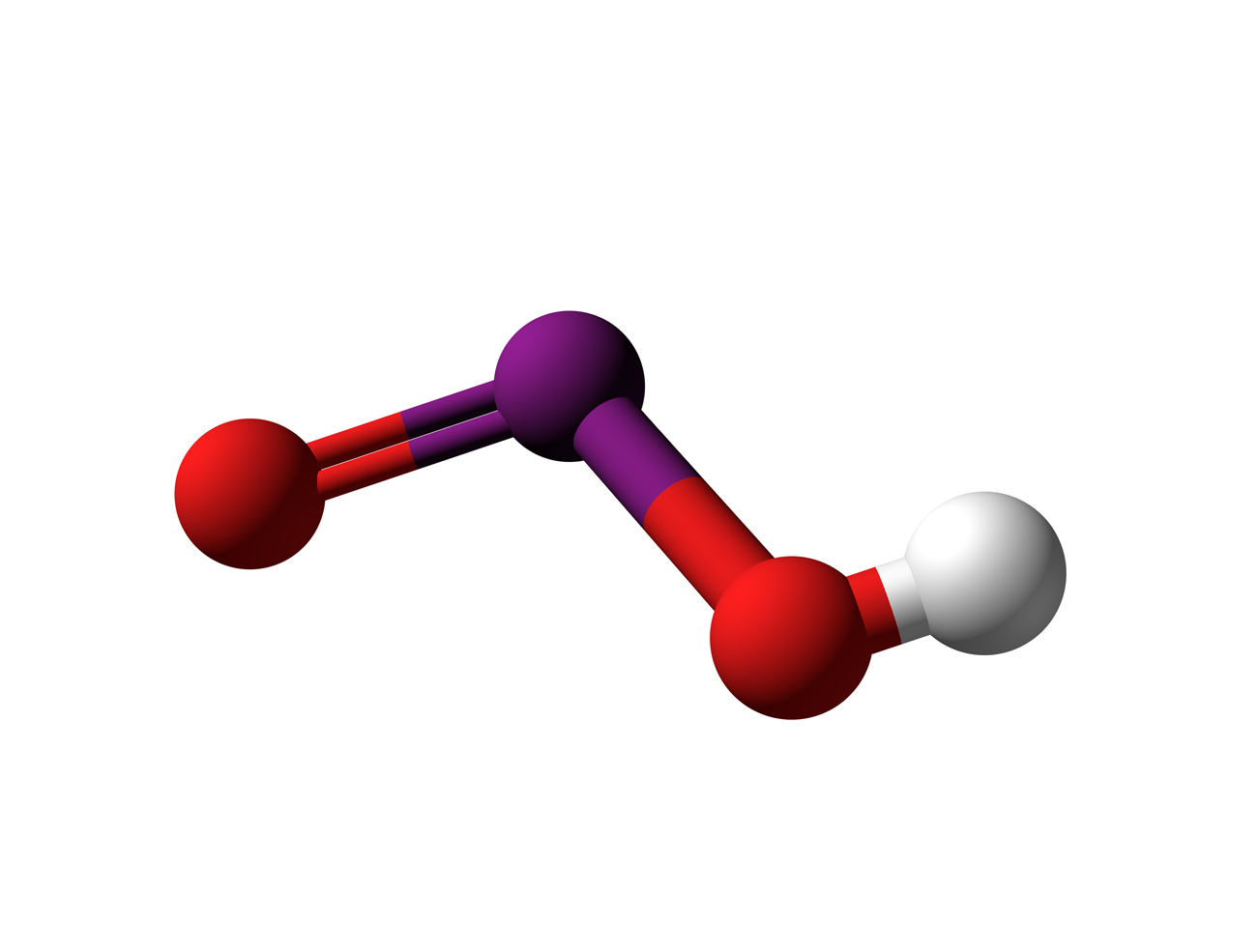
Ball-and-stick model of iodous acid
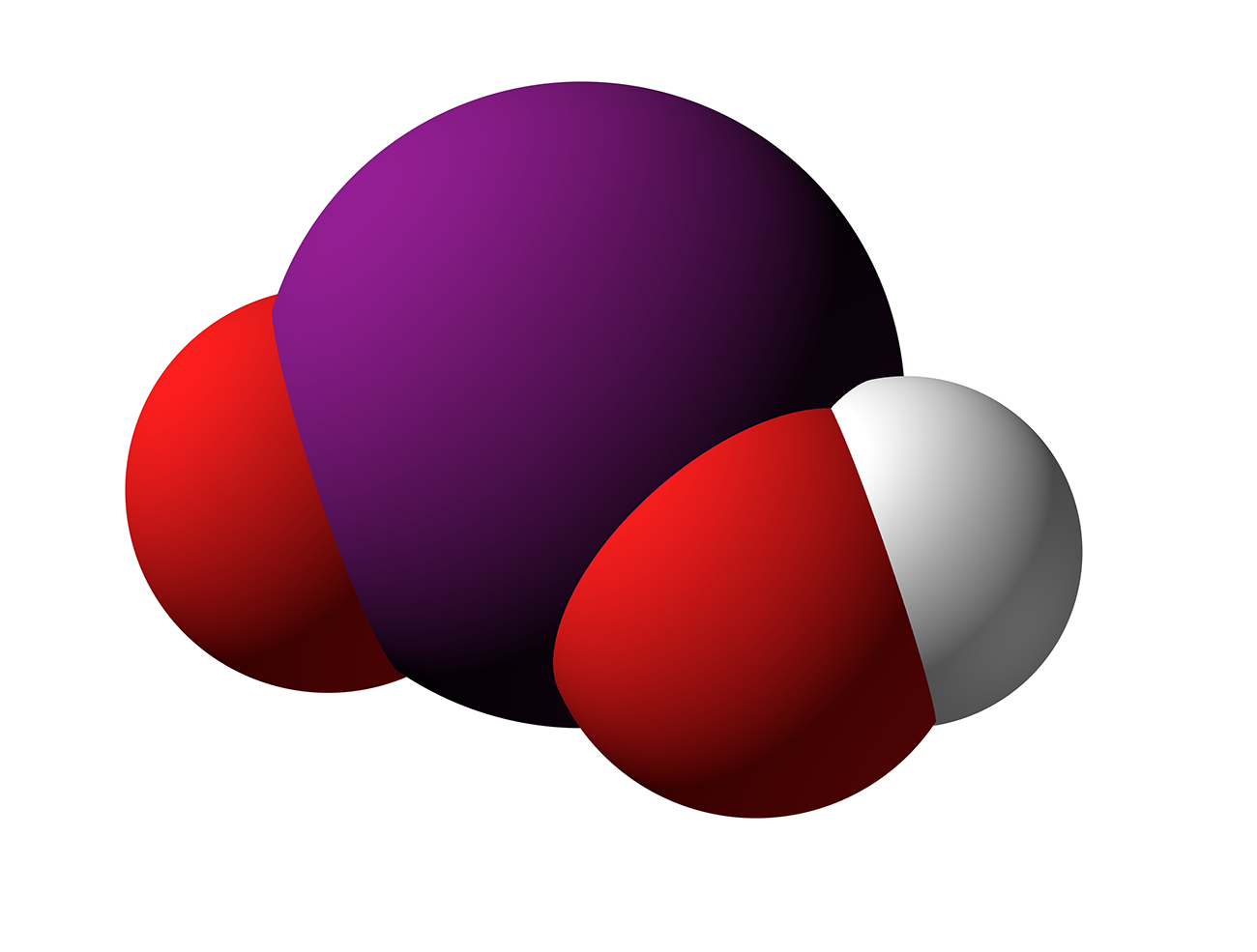
Space-filling model of iodous acid

Names
- IUPAC name iodous acid

Identifiers
CAS Number	12134-99-5
3D model (JSmol)	Interactive image
ChemSpider	145806
ECHA InfoCard	100.032.004
PubChem CID	166623
CompTox Dashboard (EPA)	DTXSID801030159
- InChI: InChI=1S/HIO2/c2-1-3/h(H,2,3)
- SMILES: O[I+][O-]

Properties
Chemical formula	HIO_{2}
Molar mass	159.911
Conjugate base	Iodite
- Except where otherwise noted, data are given for materials in their standard state (at 25 °C [77 °F], 100 kPa). Infobox references

Iodous acid is the chemical compound with the formula HIO_{2}. Its salts are named iodites; these are exceedingly unstable and have been observed but never isolated. They will rapidly disproportionate to molecular iodine and iodates.

== Other oxyacids ==
Iodous acid is part of a series of oxyacids in which iodine can assume oxidation states of −1, +1, +3, +5, or +7. A number of neutral iodine oxides are also known.

Iodine oxidation state	−1	+1	+3	+5	+7
Name	Hydrogen iodide	Hypoiodous acid	Iodous acid	Iodic acid	Periodic acid
Formula	HI	HIO	HIO_{2}	HIO_{3}	HIO_{4} or H_{5}IO_{6}
