= Halite (oxyanion) =

Class of anions

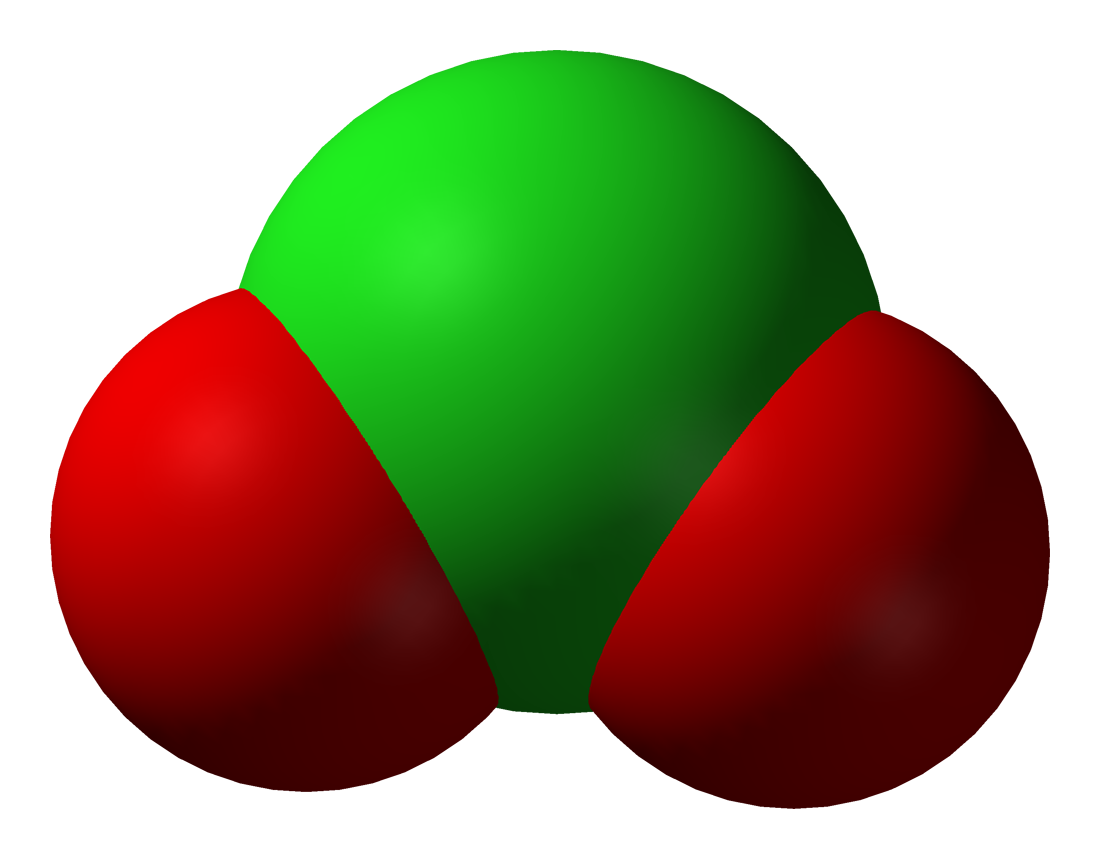
Chlorite (ClO^{−}_{2}), a halite

A halite, also known as a halogenite, is an oxyanion containing a halogen in a +3 oxidation state. It is the conjugate base of a halous acid. The known halites are chlorite, bromite, and iodite.

== Uses ==
Halites can be used to generate the respective halogen dioxides via a one-electron oxidation:

5 NaClO_{2} + 4 HCl → 5 NaCl + 4 ClO^{•}_{2} + 2 H_{2}O
BrO^{−}_{2} + HBrO_{3} + H^{+} → 2 BrO^{•}_{2} + H_{2}O

This reaction in particular is used in bleach to generate chlorine dioxide.

== Stability ==
Chlorites tend to decompose rapidly, some even explosively, upon heating. A few bromites have been isolated, but no iodites have.
