= Criegee oxidation =

Reaction in organic chemistry

Named after	Rudolf Criegee
Reaction type	Organic redox reaction

Identifiers
RSC ontology ID	RXNO:0000257

The Criegee oxidation is a glycol cleavage reaction in which vicinal diols are oxidized to form ketones and aldehydes using lead tetraacetate. It is analogous to the use of periodate (Malaprade reaction) but uses a milder oxidant. This oxidation was discovered by Rudolf Criegee and coworkers and first reported in 1931 using ethylene glycol as the substrate.

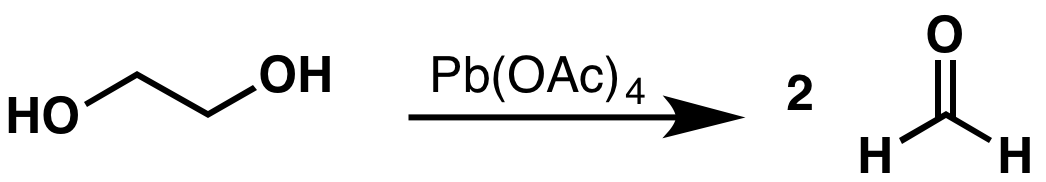

The rate of the reaction is highly dependent on the relative geometric position of the two hydroxyl groups, so much so that diols that are cis on certain rings can be reacted selectively as opposed to those that are trans on them. It was heavily stressed by Criegee that the reaction must be run in anhydrous solvents, as any water present would hydrolyze the lead tetraacetate; however, subsequent publications have reported that if the rate of oxidation is faster than the rate of hydrolysis, the cleavage can be run in wet solvents or even aqueous solutions. For example, glucose, glycerol, mannitol, and xylose can all undergo a Criegee oxidation in aqueous solutions, but sucrose cannot.

== Mechanism ==
Two mechanisms are proposed for the Criegee oxidation, depending on the configuration of the diol. If the oxygen atoms of the two hydroxy groups are conformationally close enough to form a five-membered ring with the lead atom, the reaction occurs via a cyclic intermediate. If the structure cannot adopt such a conformation, an alternate mechanism is possible, but is slower. Trans-fused five member rings are heavily strained, thus trans-diols that are on a five-membered ring will react slower than cis-alcohols on such a structure.

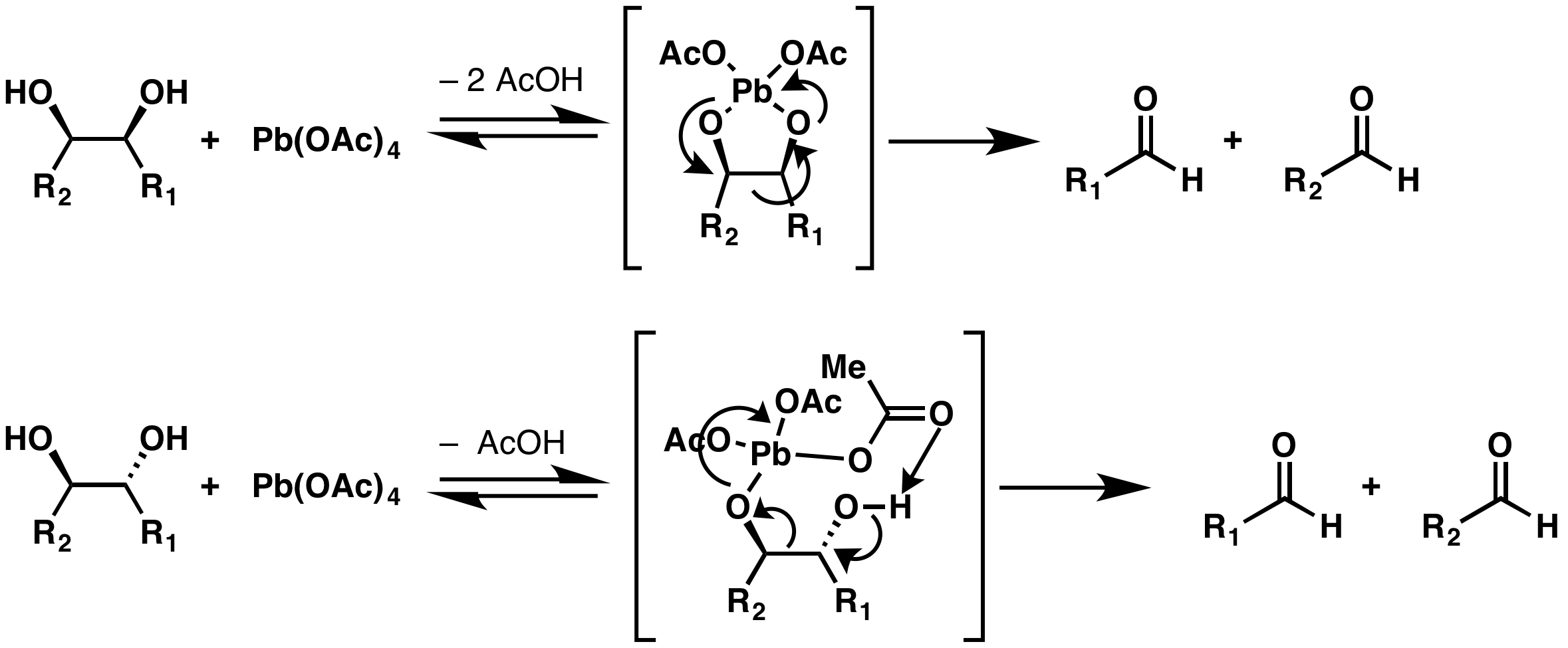
Criegee Mechanism

== Modifications ==
Although the classic substrate for the Criegee oxidation are 1,2-diols, the oxidation can be employed with β-amino alcohols, α-hydroxy carbonyls, and α-keto acids, In the case of β-amino alcohols, a free radical mechanism is proposed.

The Criegee oxidation can also be employed with 2,3-epoxy alcohols forms α-acetoxy carbonyls. Because the substrates can be produced with specific stereochemistry, such as by Sharpless epoxidation of allylic alcohols, this process can yield chiral molecules.

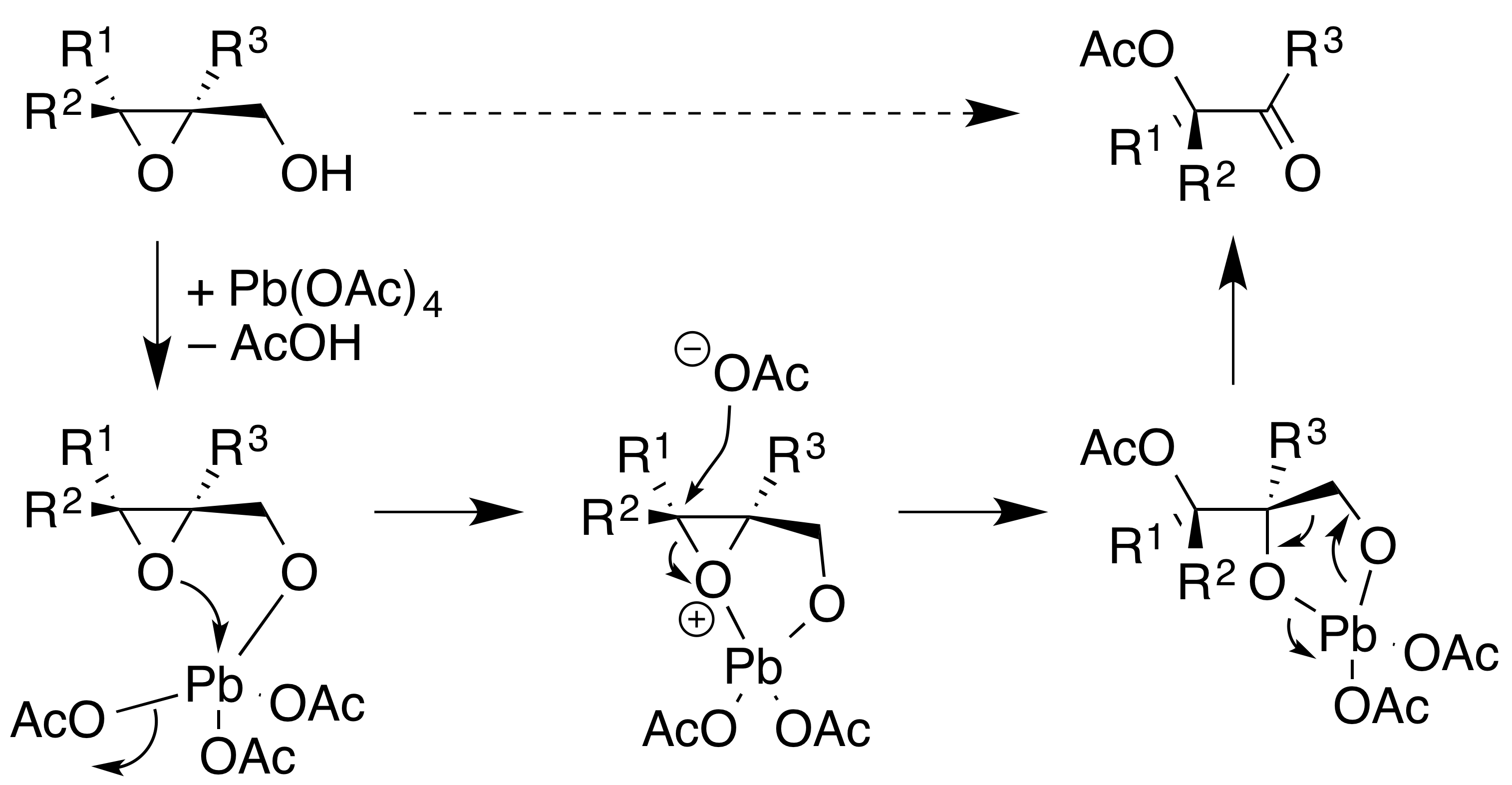

Criegee oxidations are commonly used in carbohydrate chemistry to cleave 1,2-glycols and differentiate between different kinds of glycol groups.
