= Zirconium(IV) acetate =

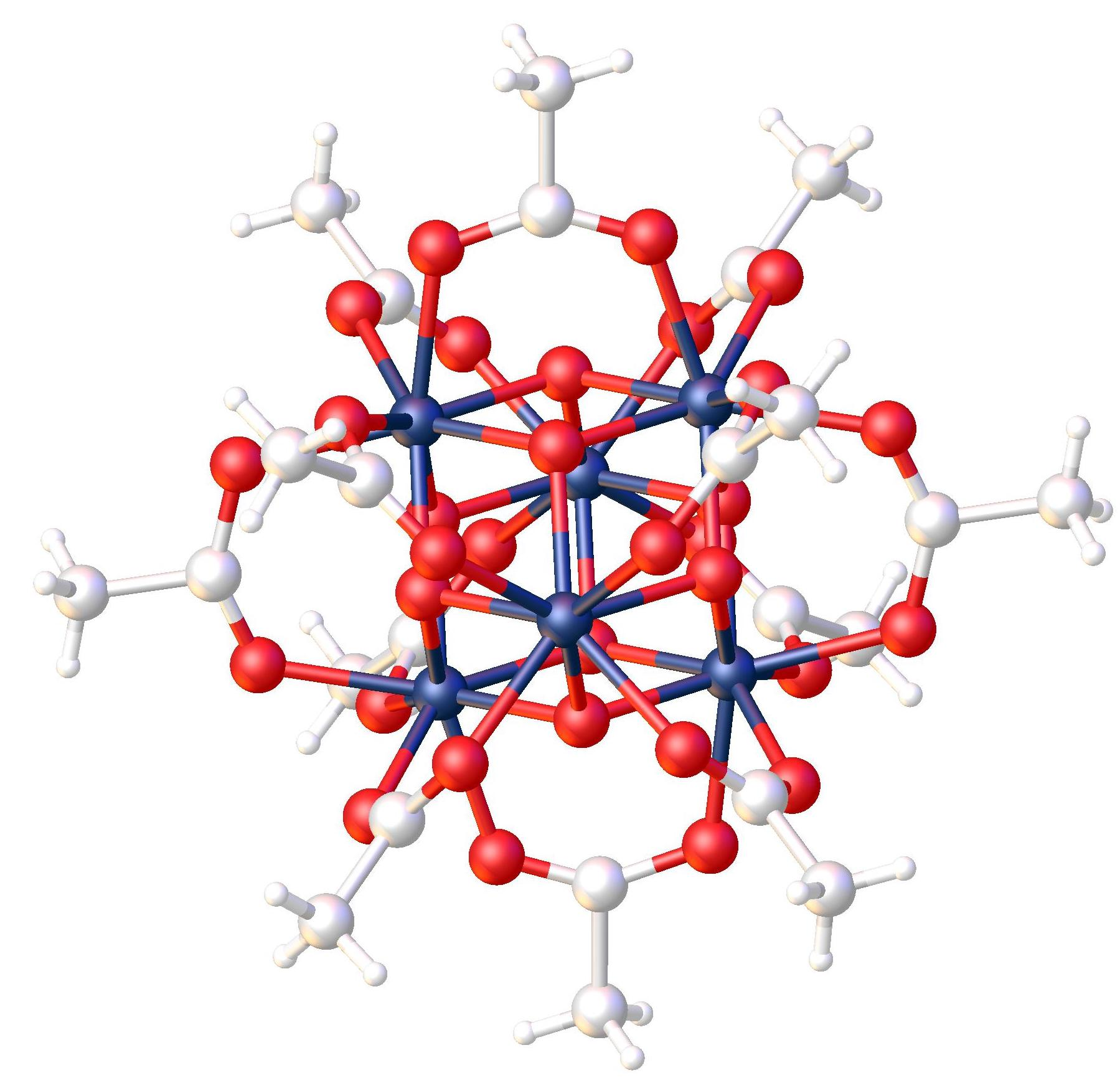

Identifiers
CAS Number	4229-34-9
3D model (JSmol)	Interactive image
ECHA InfoCard	100.021.982
CompTox Dashboard (EPA)	DTXSID20890586
- InChI: InChI=1S/12C2H4O2.4H2O.4O.6Zr/c12*1-2(3)4;;;;;;;;;;;;;;/h12*1H3,(H,3,4);4*1H2;;;;;;;;;;/q;;;;;;;;;;;;;;;;4*-2;6*+4/p-16 Key: RGWBNEKRIQDQRP-UHFFFAOYSA-A
- SMILES: [Zr+4].[Zr+4].[Zr+4].[Zr+4].[Zr+4].[Zr+4].[OH-].[OH-].[OH-].[OH-].[O-2].[O-2].[O-2].[O-2].CC(=O)[O-].CC(=O)[O-].CC(=O)[O-].CC(=O)[O-].CC(=O)[O-].CC(=O)[O-].CC(=O)[O-].CC(=O)[O-].CC(=O)[O-].CC(=O)[O-].CC(=O)[O-].CC(=O)[O-]

Properties
Chemical formula	Zr_{6}O_{4}(OH)_{4}(CH_{3}CO_{2})_{12}
Molar mass	1387.896 g·mol^{−1}
Appearance	white solid
Solubility in water	soluble

Related compounds
Related compounds	zirconium dioxide, zirconium(IV) chloride
- Except where otherwise noted, data are given for materials in their standard state (at 25 °C [77 °F], 100 kPa). Infobox references

Zirconium(IV) acetate or zirconyl acetate, or just zirconium acetate, usually refers to the chemical formula Zr_{6}O_{4}(OH)_{4}(CH_{3}CO_{2})_{12} (hexazirconium(IV) tetroxide tetrahydroxide dodecaacetate). It is a white solid formed by the reaction of zirconyl chloride with acetic acid. Claims of Zr(CH_{3}CO_{2})_{4} (zirconium(IV) acetate) have been superseded by experiments using X-ray crystallography.

The species Zr_{6}O_{4}(OH)_{4}(CH_{3}CO_{2})_{12} is a common precursor to metal-organic frameworks (MOFs). The structure of the 8.5 hydrate (Zr_{6}O_{4}(OH)_{4}(CH_{3}CO_{2})_{12}·8.5H_{2}O) has been determined by EXAFS. The core can be described as a Zr_{6} octahedron is face-capped with oxide and hydroxide ligands.
