= Periodic acid =

Oxoacid of iodine (H5IO6 or HIO4)

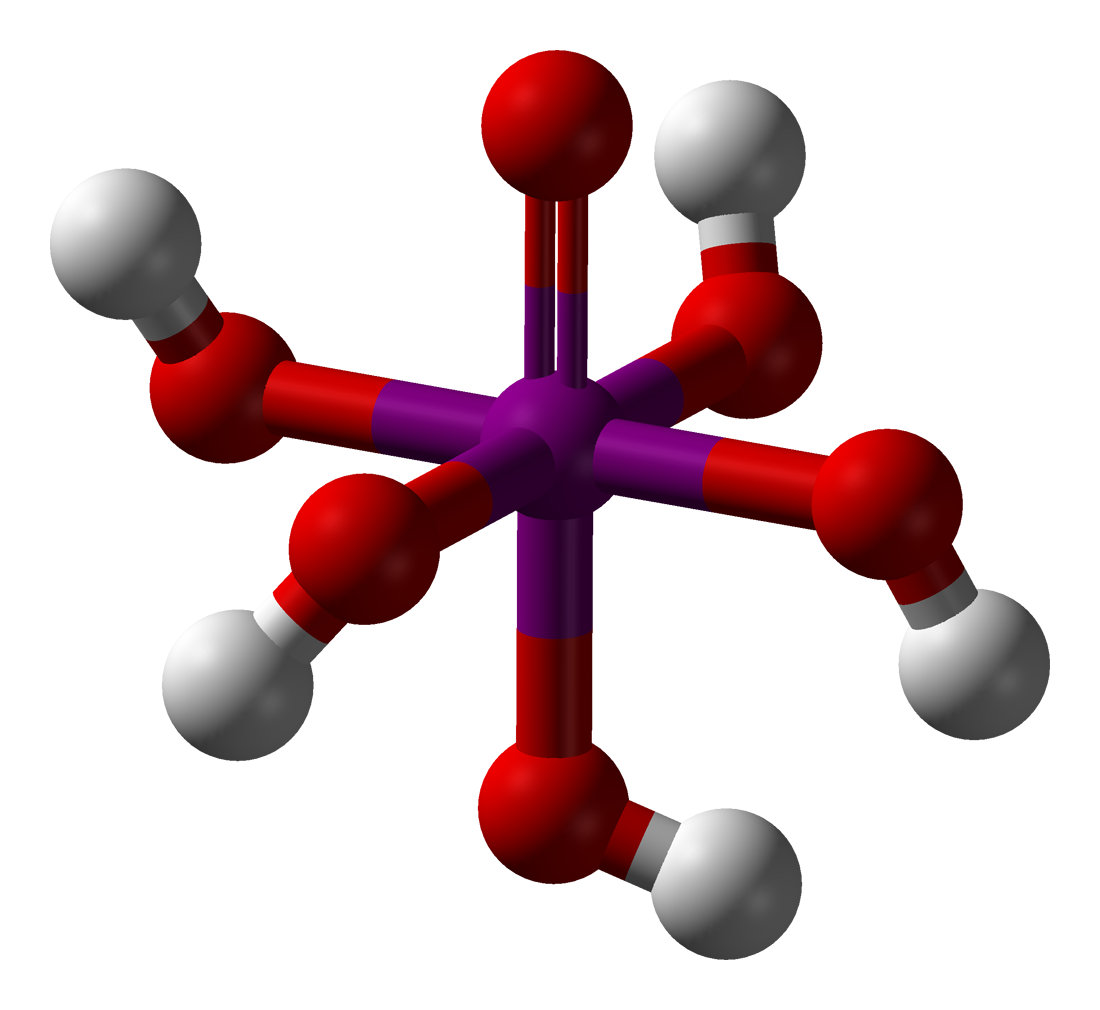
Orthoperiodic acid

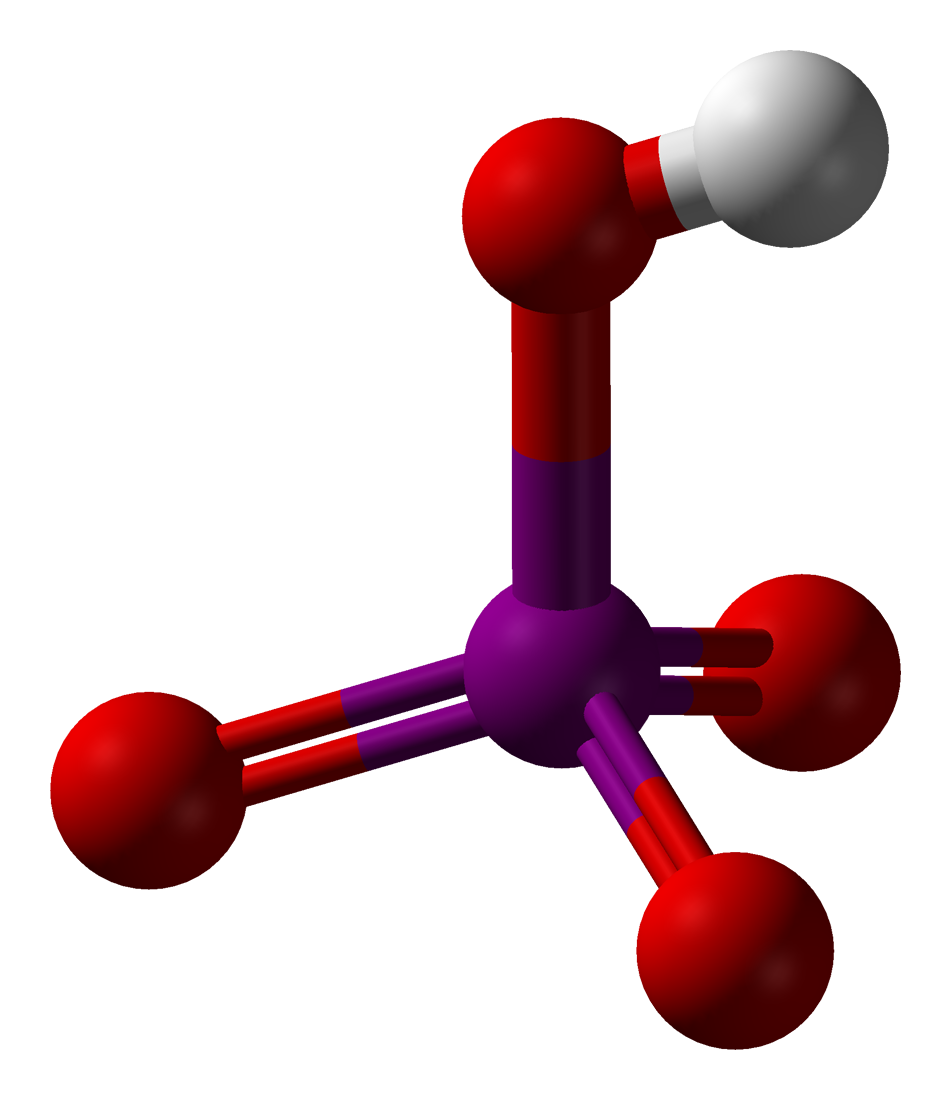
Metaperiodic acid
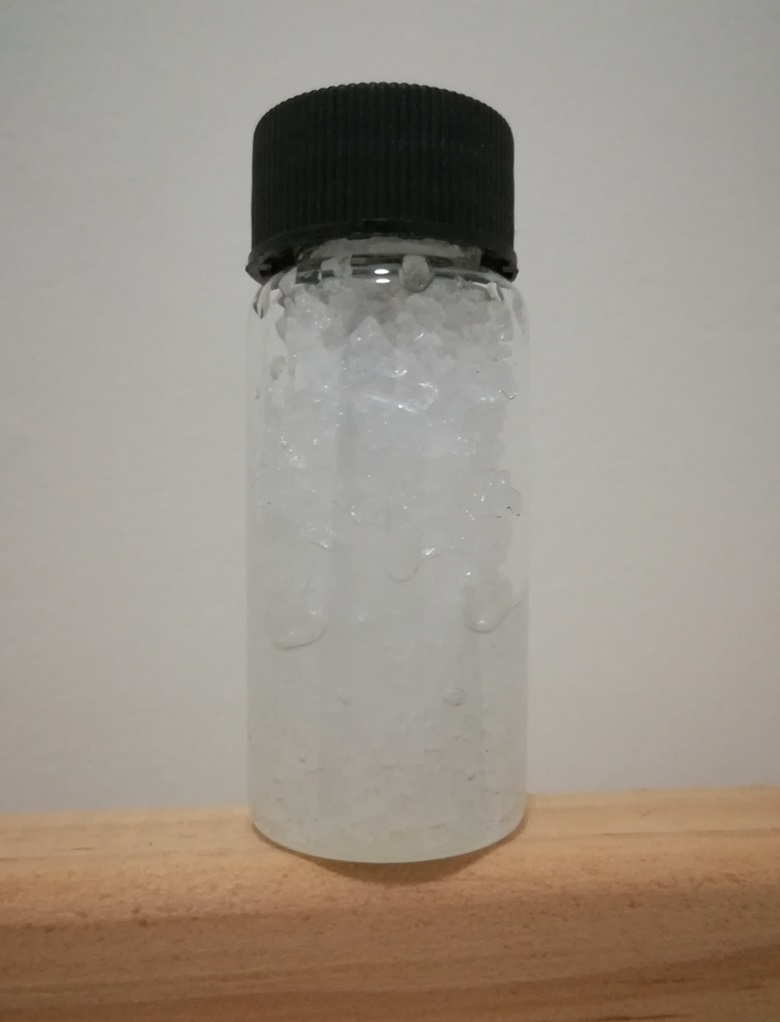
- Orthoperiodic acid

Names
- Other names: Paraperiodic acid; Iodic(VII) acid; Hydrogen periodate

Identifiers
CAS Number	orthoperiodic: 10450-60-9; metaperiodic: 13444-71-8
3D model (JSmol)	orthoperiodic: Interactive image; metaperiodic: Interactive image
ChemSpider	orthoperiodic: 23622; metaperiodic: 58684
ECHA InfoCard	100.030.839
EC Number	orthoperiodic: 236-585-6
PubChem CID	metaperiodic: 65185
UNII	orthoperiodic: AK1D44L87G; metaperiodic: D4B1481B2J
UN number	UN3085
CompTox Dashboard (EPA)	orthoperiodic: DTXSID10883144
- InChI: orthoperiodic: InChI=I=1S/H5IO6/c2-1(3,4,5,6)7/h(H5,2,3,4,5,6,7) Key: TWLXDPFBEPBAQB-UHFFFAOYSA-N; metaperiodic: InChI=1/HIO4/c2-1(3,4)5/h(H,2,3,4,5) Key: KHIWWQKSHDUIBK-UHFFFAOYAH
- SMILES: orthoperiodic: OI(=O)(O)(O)(O)O; metaperiodic: O[I+3]([O-])([O-])[O-]

Properties
Chemical formula	HIO_{4} (metaperiodic); H_{5}IO_{6} (orthoperiodic)
Molar mass	190.91 g/mol (HIO_{4}); 227.941 g/mol (H_{5}IO_{6})
Appearance	Colourless crystals
Melting point	128.5 °C (263.3 °F; 401.6 K)
Solubility	soluble in water, alcohols
Acidity (pK_{a})	pK_{a1} = 3.29; pK_{a2} = 8.31; pK_{a1} = 11.60
Conjugate base	Periodate

Hazards
- GHS labelling
Pictograms	(GHS03: Oxidizing) (GHS05: Corrosive) (GHS08: Health hazard) (GHS09: Environmental hazard)
Signal word	Danger
Hazard statements	H271, H314, H372, H400
Precautionary statements	P210, P260, P273, P303+P361+P353, P305+P351+P338
NFPA 704 (fire diamond)	3 0 0 OX
Safety data sheet (SDS)	External MSDS

Related compounds
Other anions	Perchloric acid HClO_{4}; Perbromic acid HBrO_{4}; Permanganic acid HMnO_{4}; Telluric acid Te(OH)_{6}; Perxenic acid H_{4}XeO_{6}
Other cations	Sodium periodate; Potassium periodate
- Except where otherwise noted, data are given for materials in their standard state (at 25 °C [77 °F], 100 kPa). verify (what is ?) Infobox references

Periodic acid (/ˌpɜːraɪˈɒdɪk/ per-eye-OD-ik) is an oxoacid of iodine. It can exist in two forms: orthoperiodic acid, with the chemical formula H_{5}IO_{6}, and metaperiodic acid, which has the formula HIO_{4}. Periodic acids are colourless crystals. Periodic acid features iodine in the highest oxidation state of +7.

Periodic acid was discovered by Heinrich Gustav Magnus and C. F. Ammermüller in 1833.

== Properties ==
Orthoperiodic acid has a number of acid dissociation constants. The pK_{a} of metaperiodic acid has not been determined.

H_{5}IO_{6} ⇌ H_{4}IO^{−}_{6} + H^{+}, pK_{a1} = 3.29

H_{4}IO^{−}_{6} ⇌ H_{3}IO^{2−}_{6} + H^{+}, pK_{a2} = 8.31

H_{3}IO^{2−}_{6} ⇌ H_{2}IO^{3−}_{6} + H^{+}, pK_{a1} = 11.60

There being two forms of periodic acid, it follows that two types of periodate salts are formed. For example, sodium metaperiodate, NaIO_{4}, can be synthesised from HIO_{4} while sodium orthoperiodate, Na_{5}IO_{6} can be synthesised from H_{5}IO_{6}.

=== Structure ===
Orthoperiodic acid forms monoclinic crystals (space group P2_{1}/n) consisting of a slightly deformed IO_{6} octahedron interlinked via bridging hydrogens. Five I–O bond distances are in the range 1.87–1.91 Å and one I–O bond is 1.78 Å. The structure of metaperiodic acid also includes IO_{6} octahedra, however these are connected via cis-edge-sharing with bridging oxygens to form one-dimensional infinite chains.

== Synthesis ==
Modern industrial scale production involves the oxidation of a solution of sodium iodate under alkaline conditions, either electrochemically on a PbO_{2} anode, or by treatment with chlorine:

IO^{−}_{3} + 6 HO^{−} - 2 e^{−} → IO^{5−}_{6} + 3 H_{2}O, E^{⊖} = −1.6 V
IO^{−}_{3} + 6 HO^{−} + Cl_{2} → IO^{5−}_{6} + 2 Cl^{−} + 3 H_{2}O

A standard laboratory preparation involves treating a mixture of tribarium dihydrogen orthoperiodate with nitric acid. Upon concentrating the mixture, the barium nitrate, which is less soluble, is separated from periodic acid:

Ba_{3}(H_{2}IO_{6})_{2} + 6 HNO_{3} → 3 Ba(NO_{3})_{2} + 2 H_{5}IO_{6}

== Reactions ==
Orthoperiodic acid can be dehydrated to give metaperiodic acid by heating to 100 °C (212 °F) under reduced pressure.

H_{5}IO_{6} ⇌ HIO_{4} + 2 H_{2}O

Further heating to around 150 °C (302 °F) gives iodine pentoxide (I_{2}O_{5}) rather than the expected anhydride diiodine heptoxide (I_{2}O_{7}). Metaperiodic acid can also be prepared from various orthoperiodates by treatment with dilute nitric acid.

Like all periodates periodic acid can be used to cleave various 1,2-difunctional compounds. Most notably periodic acid will cleave vicinal diols into two aldehyde or ketone fragments (Malaprade reaction).

This can be useful in determining the structure of carbohydrates as periodic acid can be used to open saccharide rings. This process is often used in labeling saccharides with fluorescent molecules or other tags such as biotin. Because the process requires vicinal diols, periodate oxidation is often used to selectively label the 3′-termini of RNA (ribose has vicinal diols) instead of DNA as deoxyribose does not have vicinal diols.

Periodic acid is also used as an oxidising agent of moderate strength, as exemplified in the Babler oxidation of secondary allyl alcohols which are oxidised to enones by stoichiometric amounts of orthoperiodic acid with catalyst PCC.

Violent explosions have occurred when using a Dimethyl sulfoxide (DMSO)-Periodic acid oxidizing system with a relatively low concentration of the acid (1.5 N).

== Other oxyacids ==
Periodic acid is part of a series of oxyacids in which iodine can assume oxidation states of −1, +1, +3, +5, or +7. A number of neutral iodine oxides are also known.

Iodine oxidation state	−1	+1	+3	+5	+7
Name	Hydrogen iodide	Hypoiodous acid	Iodous acid	Iodic acid	Periodic acid
Formula	HI	HIO	HIO_{2}	HIO_{3}	HIO_{4} or H_{5}IO_{6}

== See also ==
Compounds with a similar structure:

- Perchloric acid, perbromic acid, the related perhalogenic acids
- Telluric acid and perxenic acid, the isoelectronic oxoacids of tellurium and xenon

Compounds with similar chemistry:

- Lead tetraacetate (Criegee oxidation)
