= Lead(IV) acetate =

Organometallic compound (Pb(C2H3O2)4)

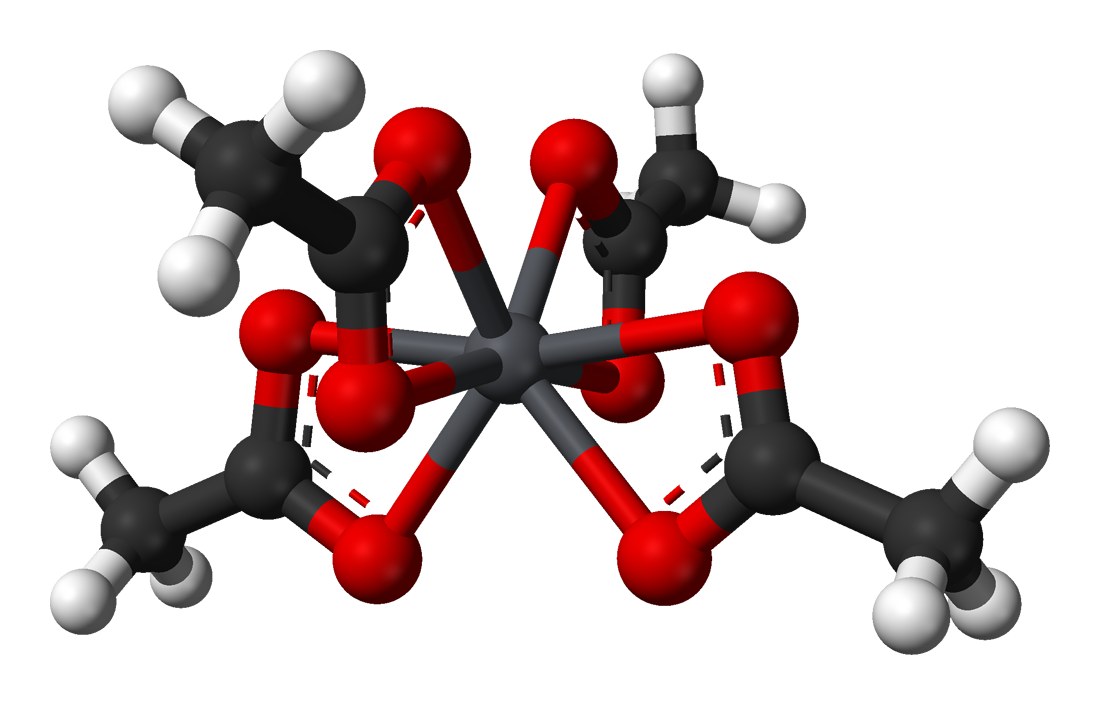

Names
- IUPAC name Lead(IV) acetate
- Systematic IUPAC name Tetrakis(acetyloxy)plumbane
- Other names Lead tetraacetate Plumbic acetate

Identifiers
CAS Number	546-67-8
3D model (JSmol)	monodentate acetate: Interactive image; bidentate acetate: Interactive image
ChEBI	CHEBI:77245
ChemSpider	10608816
ECHA InfoCard	100.008.099
EC Number	208-908-0
PubChem CID	11025
UNII	CFN24B03DB
CompTox Dashboard (EPA)	DTXSID801047756 DTXSID6041058, DTXSID801047756
- InChI: InChI=1S/4C2H4O2.Pb/c4*1-2(3)4;/h4*1H3,(H,3,4);/q;;;;+4/p-4 Key: JEHCHYAKAXDFKV-UHFFFAOYSA-J
- SMILES: monodentate acetate: CC(=O)O[Pb](OC(C)=O)(OC(C)=O)OC(C)=O; bidentate acetate: O0[C-](C)O[Pb+4]0123(O[C-](C)O1)(O[C-]C(C)O2)O[C-](C)O3

Properties
Chemical formula	(CH_{3}CO_{2})_{4}Pb
Molar mass	443.376 g/mol
Appearance	colorless or pink columnar crystals
Odor	vinegar
Density	2.228 g/cm^{3} (17 °C)
Melting point	175 °C (347 °F; 448 K)
Boiling point	decomposes
Solubility in water	soluble, reversible hydrolysis
Solubility	Reacts with ethanol. Soluble in chloroform, benzene, nitrobenzene, hot acetic acid, HCl(aq), tetrachloroethane.

Hazards
- Occupational safety and health (OHS/OSH)
Main hazards	Toxic
- GHS labelling
Pictograms	(GHS07: Exclamation mark) (GHS08: Health hazard) (GHS09: Environmental hazard)
Signal word	Danger
NFPA 704 (fire diamond)	3 0 0

Related compounds
Related compounds	Lead(II) acetate; Tin(IV) acetate; Zirconium(IV) acetate; Bismuth(III) acetate
- Except where otherwise noted, data are given for materials in their standard state (at 25 °C [77 °F], 100 kPa). verify (what is ?) Infobox references

Lead(IV) acetate or lead tetraacetate is an metalorganic compound with chemical formula (CH_{3}CO_{2})_{4}Pb, often abbreviated as Pb(OAc)_{4}, where Ac is acetyl. It is a colorless solid that is soluble in nonpolar, organic solvents, indicating that it is not a salt. It is degraded by moisture and is typically stored with additional acetic acid. The compound is used in organic synthesis.

== Structure ==
In the solid state the lead(IV) centers are coordinated by four acetate ions, which are bidentate, each coordinating via two oxygen atoms. The lead atom is 8 coordinate and the O atoms form a flattened trigonal dodecahedron.

== Preparation ==
It is typically prepared by treating of red lead with acetic acid and acetic anhydride (Ac_{2}O), which absorbs water. The net reaction is shown:

Pb_{3}O_{4} + 4 Ac_{2}O → Pb(OAc)_{4} + 2 Pb(OAc)_{2}

The remaining lead(II) acetate can be partially oxidized to the tetraacetate by Cl_{2}, with a PbCl_{2} by-product:

2 Pb(OAc)_{2} + Cl_{2} → Pb(OAc)_{4} + PbCl_{2}

== Reagent in organic chemistry ==
Lead tetraacetate is a strong oxidizing agent, a source of acetyloxy groups, and a general reagent for the preparation of organolead compounds. Some of its many uses in organic chemistry:

- Acetoxylation of benzylic, allylic, and α-oxygen ether C−H bonds, for example the conversion of dioxane to 2-acetoxy-1,4-dioxane
- An alternative reagent to bromine in Hofmann rearrangement
- Dehydrogenation of hydrazones and hydrazines, for example that of hexafluoroacetone hydrazone to bis(trifluoromethyl)diazomethane
- Cleavage of α-hydroxy acids or 1,2-diols to their corresponding aldehydes or ketones, often replacing ozonolysis; for instance, the oxidation of di-n-butyl d-tartrate to n-butyl glyoxylate.
- Reaction with alkenes to form γ-lactones
- Oxidation of alcohols carrying a δ-proton to cyclic ethers.
- Oxidative cleavage of certain allyl alcohols in conjunction with ozone:
- Transformation of 1,2-dicarboxylic acids or cyclic anhydrides to alkenes

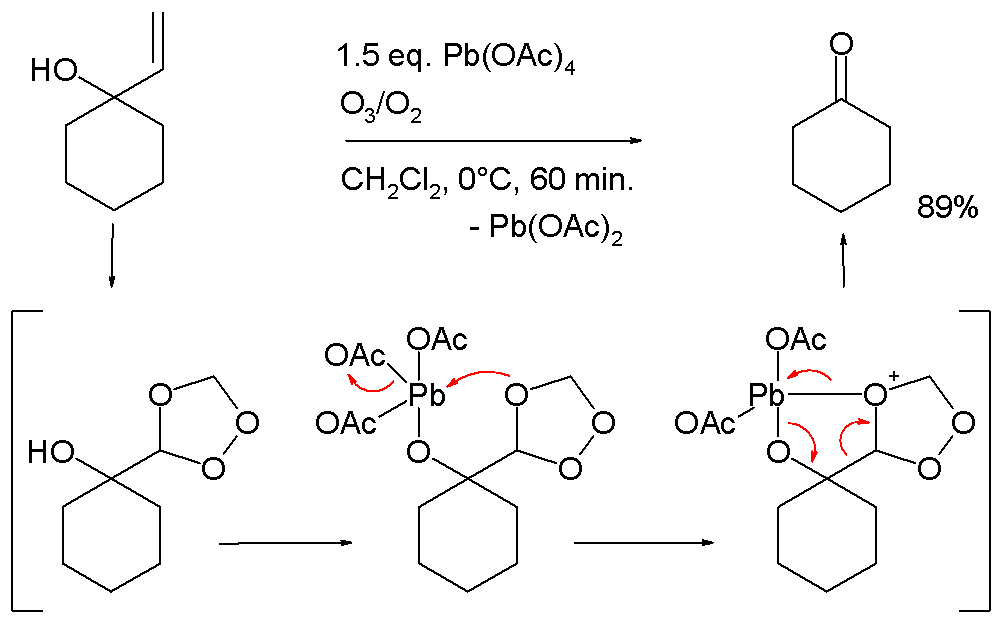
oxidative cleavage of allyl alcohols

- Conversion of acetophenones to phenyl acetic acids
- Decarboxylation of carboxylic acids to alkyl halides in the Kochi reaction

== Safety ==
Lead(IV) acetate is toxic, because of lead. It is a neurotoxin. It badly affects the gum tissue, central nervous system, kidneys, blood, and reproductive system.
