= Berkelium compounds =

Chemical compounds

Berkelium forms a number of chemical compounds, where it normally exists in an oxidation state of +3 or +4, and behaves similarly to its lanthanide analogue, terbium. Like all actinides, berkelium easily dissolves in various aqueous inorganic acids, liberating gaseous hydrogen and converting into the trivalent oxidation state. This trivalent state is the most stable, especially in aqueous solutions, but tetravalent berkelium compounds are also known. The existence of divalent berkelium salts is uncertain and has only been reported in mixed lanthanum chloride-strontium chloride melts. Aqueous solutions of Bk^{3+} ions are green in most acids. The color of the Bk^{4+} ions is yellow in hydrochloric acid and orange-yellow in sulfuric acid. Berkelium does not react rapidly with oxygen at room temperature, possibly due to the formation of a protective oxide surface layer; however, it reacts with molten metals, hydrogen, halogens, chalcogens and pnictogens to form various binary compounds. Berkelium can also form several organometallic compounds.

== Oxides ==
Two oxides of berkelium are known, with berkelium in the +3 (Bk_{2}O_{3}) and +4 (BkO_{2}) oxidation states. Berkelium(IV) oxide is a brown solid that crystallizes in a cubic (fluorite) crystal structure with the space group Fm3̅m and the coordination numbers of Bk[8] and O[4]. The lattice parameter is 533.4 ± 0.5 pm.

Berkelium(III) oxide, a yellow-green solid, is formed from BkO_{2} by reduction with hydrogen:

$$\mathrm{2\ BkO_2\ +\ H_2\ \longrightarrow \ Bk_2O_3\ +\ H_2O}$$

The compound has a melting point of 1920 °C, body-centered cubic crystal lattice and a lattice constant a = 1088.0 ± 0.5 pm. Upon heating to 1200 °C, the cubic Bk_{2}O_{3} transforms to a monoclinic structure, which further converts to a hexagonal phase at 1750 °C; the latter transition is reversible. Such three-phase behavior is typical for the actinide sesquioxides.

A divalent oxide BkO has been reported as a brittle gray solid with a face centered cubic (fcc) structure and a lattice constant a = 496.4 pm, but its exact chemical composition is uncertain.

== Halides ==
In halides, berkelium assumes the oxidation states +3 and +4. The +3 state is most stable, especially in solutions, and the tetravalent halides BkF_{4} and Cs_{2}BkCl_{6} are only known in the solid phase. The coordination of the berkelium atom in its trivalent fluoride and chloride is tricapped trigonal prismatic, with a coordination number of 9. In the trivalent bromide, it is bicapped trigonal prismatic (coordination 8) or octahedral (coordination 6), and in the iodide it is octahedral.

Oxidation number	F	Cl	Br	I
+4	Berkelium(IV) fluoride BkF_{4} Yellow	Cs_{2}BkCl_{6} Orange		
+3	Berkelium(III) fluoride BkF_{3} Yellow	Berkelium(III) chloride BkCl_{3} Green; Cs_{2}NaBkCl_{6}	Berkelium(III) bromide BkBr_{3} Yellow-green	Berkelium(III) iodide BkI_{3} Yellow

=== Fluorides ===
Berkelium(IV) fluoride (BkF_{4}) is a yellow-green ionic solid which crystallizes in the monoclinic crystal system (Pearson symbol mS60, space group C2/c No. 15, lattice constants a = 1247 pm, b = 1058 pm, c = 817 pm) and is isotypic with uranium tetrafluoride or zirconium(IV) fluoride.

Berkelium(III) fluoride (BkF_{3}) is also a yellow-green solid, but it has two crystalline structures. The most stable phase at low temperatures has an orthorhombic symmetry, isotypic with yttrium(III) fluoride (Pearson symbol oP16, space group Pnma, No. 62, a = 670 pm, b = 709 pm, c = 441 pm). Upon heating to 350 to 600 °C, it transforms to a trigonal structure found in lanthanum(III) fluoride (Pearson symbol hP24, space group P3̅c1, No. 165, a = 697 pm, c = 714 pm).

=== Chlorides ===
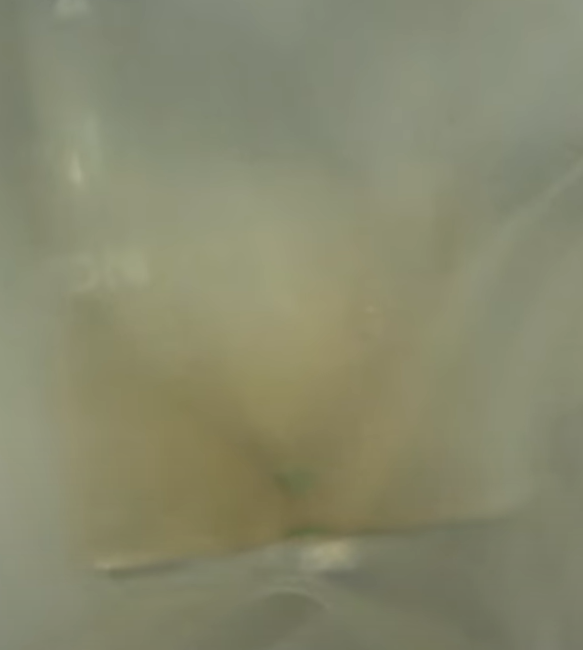
Berkelium(III) chloride

Visible amounts of berkelium(III) chloride (BkCl_{3}) were first isolated and characterized in 1962, and weighed only 3 billionths of a gram. It can be prepared by introducing hydrogen chloride vapors into an evacuated quartz tube containing berkelium oxide at a temperature of about 500 °C. This green solid has a melting point of 603 °C and crystallizes in the hexagonal crystal system isotypic with uranium(III) chloride (Pearson symbol hP8, space group P6_{3}/m, No. 176). Upon heating to just below its melting point, BkCl_{3} converts into an orthorhombic phase. The hexahydrate BkCl_{3}·6H_{2}O (berkelium trichloride hexahydrate) has a monoclinic structure with the lattice constants a = 966 pm, b = 654 pm and c = 797 pm. Another berkelium(III) chloride, Cs_{2}NaBkCl_{6} can be crystallized from a chilled aqueous solution containing berkelium(III) hydroxide, hydrochloric acid and caesium chloride. It has a face-centered cubic structure where Bk(III) ions are surrounded by chloride ions in an octahedral configuration.

The ternary berkelium(IV) chloride Cs_{2}BkCl_{6} is obtained by dissolving berkelium(IV) hydroxide in a chilled solution of caesium chloride in concentrated hydrochloric acid. It forms orange hexagonal crystals with the lattice constants a = 745.1 pm and c = 1209.7 pm. The average radius of the BkCl_{6}^{2−} ion in this compound is estimated as 270 pm.

=== Bromides and iodides ===
Two forms of berkelium(III) bromide are known, a monoclinic with berkelium coordination 6 and orthorhombic with coordination 8; the latter is less stable and transforms to the former phase upon heating to about 350 °C. An important phenomenon for radioactive solids has been studied for these two crystal forms: the structures of fresh and aged ^{249}BkBr_{3} samples were studied using X-ray diffraction over a period longer than 3 years, so that various fractions of ^{249}Bk had beta decayed to ^{249}Cf. No change in structure was observed upon the ^{249}BkBr_{3}—^{249}CfBr_{3} transformation, even though the orthorhombic bromide was previously unknown for californium. However, other differences were noted for ^{249}BkBr_{3} and ^{249}CfBr_{3}. For example, the latter could be reduced with hydrogen to^{249}CfBr_{2}, but the former could be not – this result was reproduced on individual ^{249}BkBr_{3} and ^{249}CfBr_{3} samples, as well on the samples containing both bromides. The intergrowth of californium in berkelium occurs at a rate of 0.22% per day and is an intrinsic obstacle in studying berkelium properties. Besides a chemical contamination, ^{249}Cf, as an alpha emitter brings undesirable self-damage of the crystal lattice due to the resulting self-heating. This can be avoided by performing measurements as a function of time and extrapolating the obtained results.

Berkelium(III) iodide forms hexagonal crystals with the lattice constants a = 758.4 pm and c = 2087 pm. The known oxyhalides of berkelium include BkOCl, BkOBr and BkOI; they all crystallize in a tetragonal lattice.

== Other inorganic compounds ==
=== Pnictides ===
The monopnictides of berkelium-249 are known for the elements nitrogen, phosphorus, arsenic and antimony. They are prepared by the reaction of either berkelium(III) hydride (BkH_{3}) or metallic berkelium with these elements at elevated temperatures (about 600 °C) under high vacuum in quartz ampoules. They crystallize in the cubic crystal system with the lattice constant of 495.1 pm for BkN, 566.9 pm for BkP, 582.9 for BkAs and 619.1 pm for BkSb. These lattice constant values are smaller than those in curium pnictides, but are comparable to those of terbium pnictides.

=== Chalcogenides ===
Berkelium(III) sulfide, Bk_{2}S_{3}, has been prepared by either treating berkelium oxide with a mixture of hydrogen sulfide and carbon disulfidevapors at 1130 °C, or by directly reacting metallic berkelium with sulfur. These procedures yield brownish-black crystals with a cubic symmetry and lattice constant a = 844 pm.

=== Other compounds ===
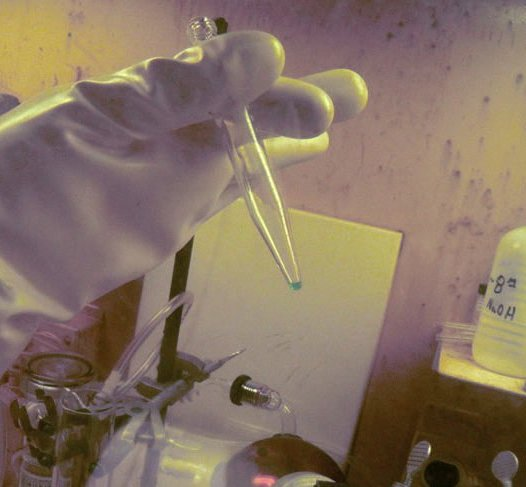
A solution of berkelium(III) nitrate

Berkelium(III) and berkelium(IV) hydroxides are both stable in 1 M sodium hydroxide solutions. Berkelium(III) phosphate (BkPO_{4}) has been prepared as a solid, which shows strong fluorescence under argon laser (514.5 nm line) excitation. Berkelium hydrides are produced by reacting metal with hydrogen gas at temperatures about 250 °C. They are non-stoichiometric with the nominal formula BkH_{2+x} (0 < x < 1). Whereas the trihydride has a hexagonal symmetry, the dihydride crystallizes in an fcc structure with the lattice constant a = 523 pm. Several other salts of berkelium are known, including Bk_{2}O_{2}S, Bk(NO_{3})_{3}·4H_{2}O, BkCl_{3}·6H_{2}O, Bk_{2}(SO_{4})_{3}·12H_{2}O and Bk_{2}(C_{2}O_{4})_{3}·4H_{2}O. Thermal decomposition at about 600 °C in an argon atmosphere (to avoid oxidation to BkO_{2}) of Bk_{2}(SO_{4})_{3}·12H_{2}O yields the body-centered orthorhombic crystals of berkelium(IV) oxysulfate (Bk_{2}O_{2}SO_{4}). This compound is thermally stable to at least 1000 °C in an inert atmosphere.

== Organoberkelium compounds ==
Berkelium forms a trigonal (η^{5}–C_{5}H_{5})_{3}Bk complex with three cyclopentadienyl rings, which can be synthesized by reacting berkelium(III) chloride with the molten beryllocene Be(C_{5}H_{5})_{2} at about 70 °C. It has an amber color and orthorhombic symmetry, with the lattice constants of a = 1411 pm, b = 1755 pm and c = 963 pm and the calculated density of 2.47 g/cm^{3}. The complex is stable to heating to at least 250 °C, and sublimates without melting at about 350 °C. The high radioactivity of berkelium gradually destroys the compound within a period of weeks. One C_{5}H_{5} ring in (η^{5}–C_{5}H_{5})_{3}Bk can be substituted by chlorine to yield [Bk(C_{5}H_{5})_{2}Cl]_{2}. The optical absorption spectra of this compound are very similar to those of (η^{5}–C_{5}H_{5})_{3}Bk.

Berkelium(III) polyborate(Bk[B_{6}O_{8}(OH)_{5}]), produced by the reaction of berkelium(III) chloride and boric acid, is a yellow solid which is unusual in the fact that the berkelium is covalently pound to the borate, similar to californium(III) polyborate.

== See also ==
- Terbium compounds
- Californium compounds

== Bibliography ==
- Greenwood, Norman N.; Earnshaw, Alan (1997). Chemistry of the Elements (2nd ed.). Butterworth-Heinemann. doi:10.1016/C2009-0-30414-6. ISBN 978-0-08-037941-8.
- Holleman, Arnold F. and Wiberg, Nils Textbook of Inorganic Chemistry, 102 Edition, de Gruyter, Berlin 2007, ISBN 978-3-11-017770-1.
- Peterson J. R. and Hobart D. E. "The Chemistry of Berkelium" in Harry Julius Emeléus (Ed.) Advances in inorganic chemistry and radiochemistry, Volume 28, Academic Press, 1984 ISBN 0-12-023628-1, pp. 29–64, doi:10.1016/S0898-8838(08)60204-4
