= Tetrafluoride =

A tetrafluoride is a chemical compound with four fluorines in its formula.

== List of tetrafluorides ==
- Argon tetrafluoride, ArF_{4} (hypothetical)
- Americium tetrafluoride, AmF_{4}
- Berkelium tetrafluoride, BkF_{4}
- Californium tetrafluoride, CfF_{4}
- Carbon tetrafluoride (tetrafluoromethane)
- Cerium tetrafluoride, CeF_{4}
- Cobalt tetrafluoride, CoF_{4}
- Curium tetrafluoride, CmF_{4}
- Diboron tetrafluoride, B_{2}F_{4}, a colorless gas
- Dinitrogen tetrafluoride, N_{2}F_{4} (Tetrafluorohydrazine)
- Einsteinium tetrafluoride, EsF_{4}
- Germanium tetrafluoride, GeF_{4}
- Hafnium tetrafluoride, HfF_{4}
- Iridium tetrafluoride, IrF_{4}
- Iron tetrafluoride, FeF_{4}
- Krypton tetrafluoride, KrF_{4} (predicted)
- Lead tetrafluoride, PbF_{4}
- Manganese tetrafluoride, MnF_{4}
- Mercury tetrafluoride, HgF_{4} (dubious)
- Molybdenum tetrafluoride, MoF_{4}
- Neodymium tetrafluoride, NdF_{4}
- Neptunium tetrafluoride, NpF_{4}
- Niobium tetrafluoride, NbF_{4}
- Oganesson tetrafluoride, OgF_{4} (predicted)
- Osmium tetrafluoride, OsF_{4}
- Palladium tetrafluoride, PdF_{4}
- Platinum tetrafluoride, PtF_{4}
- Plutonium tetrafluoride, PuF_{4}
- Polonium tetrafluoride, PoF_{4}, decomposes via radiolysis.
- Praseodymium tetrafluoride, PrF_{4}
- Protactinium tetrafluoride, PaF_{4}
- Radon tetrafluoride, RnF_{4} (predicted)
- Rhenium tetrafluoride, ReF_{4}
- Selenium tetrafluoride, SeF_{4}, a liquid at standard conditions
- Silicon tetrafluoride, SiF_{4} or Tetrafluorosilane
- Sulfur tetrafluoride, SF_{4}, a gas at standard conditions
- Tellurium tetrafluoride, TeF_{4}, a stable, white, hygroscopic crystalline solid
- Terbium tetrafluoride, TbF_{4}
- Thionyl tetrafluoride, SOF_{4}
- Thorium tetrafluoride, ThF_{4}
- Tin tetrafluoride, SnF_{4}
- Titanium tetrafluoride, TiF_{4}
- Tungsten tetrafluoride, WF_{4}
- Uranium tetrafluoride, UF_{4}, a green crystalline solid
- Vanadium tetrafluoride, VF_{4}
- Xenon tetrafluoride, XeF_{4}
- Zirconium tetrafluoride, ZrF_{4}

== Ions ==
Some atoms can form a complex ion with four fluorine atoms which may form compounds containing the term tetrafluoride. Examples include

- Tetrafluoroaluminate, [AlF_{4}]^{−}
- Tetrafluoroberyllate, [BeF_{4}]^{2−}
- Tetrafluoroborate, [BF_{4}]^{−}
- Tetrafluoromagnesate, [MgF_{4}]^{2−}
- Tetrafluoroammonium, [NF_{4}]^{+}

== See also ==
- Fluorination by sulfur tetrafluoride produces organofluorine compounds from oxidized organic compounds, including alcohols, carbonyl compounds, alkyl halides, and others
