= Californium oxide =

Californium oxide is a solid compound with two isotopes. "Californium oxide" may refer to:

- Californium(III) oxide, a yellow-green chemical compound
- Californium(IV) oxide, a dark brown chemical compound
