= Einsteinium fluoride =

Einsteinium fluoride may refer to:

- Einsteinium(III) fluoride (einsteinium trifluoride), EsF_{3}
- Einsteinium(IV) fluoride (einsteinium tetrafluoride), EsF_{4}
- Einsteinium(VI) fluoride (einsteinium hexafluoride), EsF_{6}
