= Californium tetrafluoride =

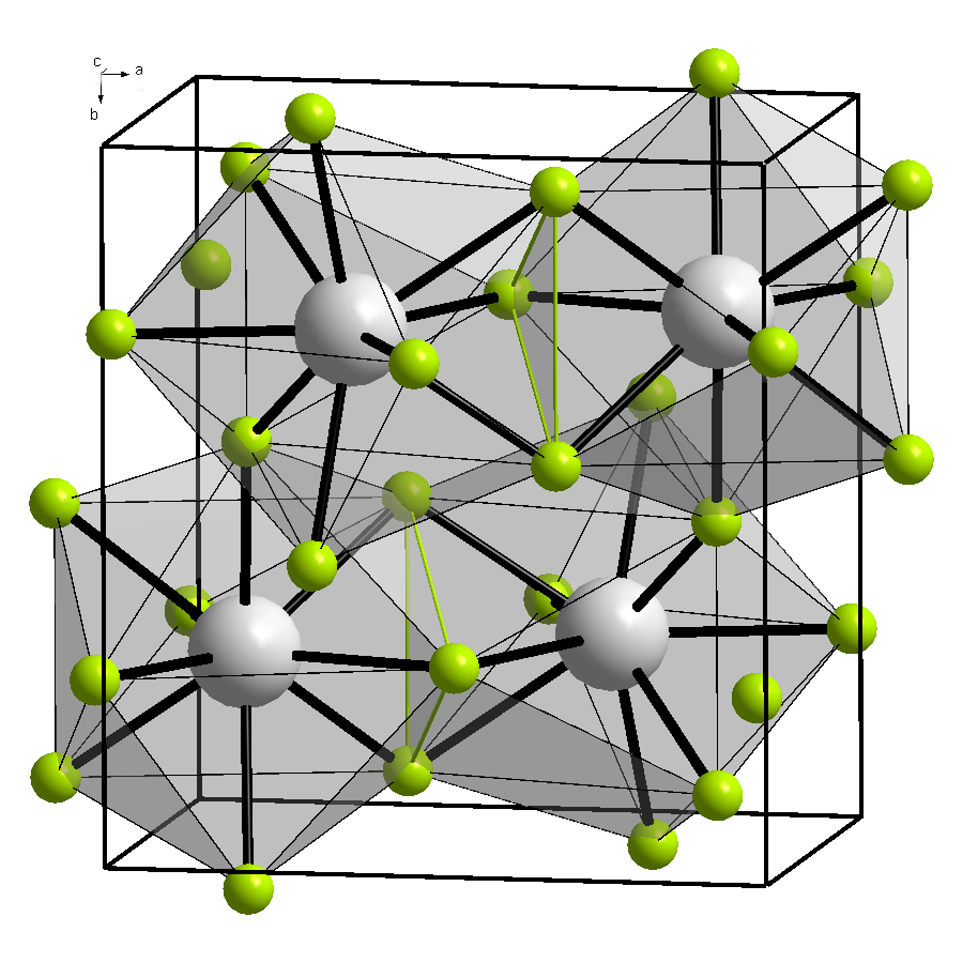

Names
- Other names Californium tetrafluoride

Identifiers
CAS Number	42845-08-9
3D model (JSmol)	Interactive image
- InChI: InChI=1S/Cf.4FH/h;4*1H/q+4;;;;/p-4 Key: OXMFOZUWMXDEGZ-UHFFFAOYSA-J
- SMILES: [Cf+4].[F-].[F-].[F-].[F-]

Properties
Chemical formula	CfF_{4}
Molar mass	327 g·mol^{−1}
Appearance	light green solid
Density	g/cm^{3}

Structure
Crystal structure	monoclinic

Related compounds
Related compounds	Berkelium tetrafluoride Einsteinium tetrafluoride

Hazards
- Occupational safety and health (OHS/OSH)
Main hazards	Radioactive
- Except where otherwise noted, data are given for materials in their standard state (at 25 °C [77 °F], 100 kPa). Infobox references

Californium tetrafluoride is a binary inorganic compound of californium and fluorine with the formula CfF_{4}.

== Synthesis ==
Californium tetrafluoride can be prepared from Cf_{2}O_{3} and F_{2} at 400 °C.

2Cf_{2}O_{3} + 8F_{2} → 4CfF_{4} + 3O_{2}

Also californium tetrafluoride is produced by β-decay of BkF_{4}.

== Physical properties ==
Californium tetrafluoride is a light green solid. It possesses a monoclinic UF_{4} structure.

== Chemical properties ==
CfF_{4} decomposes to californium trifluoride when heated:

2CfF_{4} → 2CfF_{3} + 2F
