= Curium fluoride =

Curium fluoride may refer to:

- Curium(III) fluoride (Curium trifluoride), CmF_{3}
- Curium(IV) fluoride (Curium tetrafluoride), CmF_{4}
- Curium(VI) fluoride (Curium hexafluoride), CmF_{6}
