= Berkelium(III) nitrate =

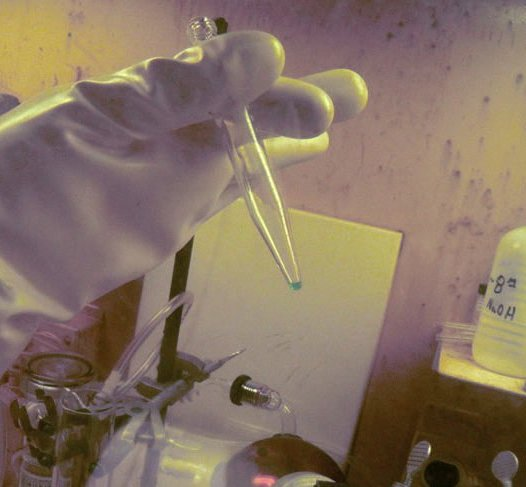
- A 22 milligram solution of berkelium(III) nitrate, photographed c. 2009/10

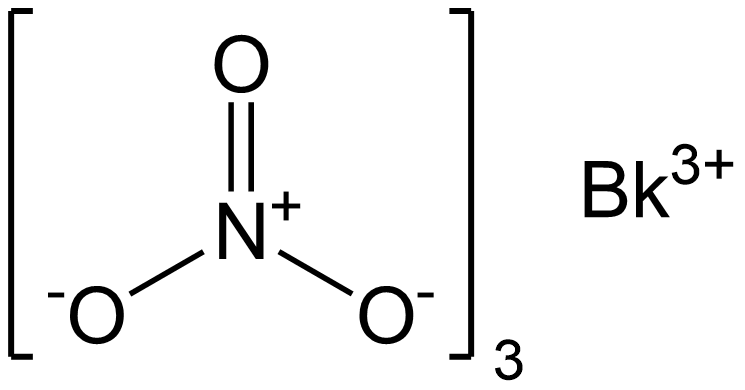

Names
- Other names: Berkelium trinitrate

Identifiers
CAS Number	42173-38-6
3D model (JSmol)	Interactive image
- InChI: InChI=1S/Bk.3NO3/c;3*2-1(3)4/q+3;3*-1 Key: JWJYBAUJHLXQJT-UHFFFAOYSA-N
- SMILES: [N+](=O)([O-])[O-].[N+](=O)([O-])[O-].[N+](=O)([O-])[O-].[Bk+3]

Properties
Chemical formula	Bk(NO_{3})_{3}
Molar mass	433.01 g/mol
Appearance	Light-green solid
Melting point	450 °C (842 °F; 723 K) decomposes
Solubility	Soluble in nitric acid

Hazards
- Occupational safety and health (OHS/OSH)
Main hazards	Radioactive
- Except where otherwise noted, data are given for materials in their standard state (at 25 °C [77 °F], 100 kPa). Infobox references

Berkelium(III) nitrate is the berkelium salt of nitric acid with the formula Bk(NO_{3})_{3}. It commonly forms the tetrahydrate, Bk(NO_{3})_{3}·4H_{2}O, which is a light green solid. If heated to 450 °C, it decomposes to berkelium(IV) oxide and 22 milligrams of the solution of this compound is reported to cost one million dollars.

== Production and uses ==
Berkelium(III) nitrate is produced by the reaction of berkelium metal, the hydroxide, or chloride with nitric acid. This compound has no commercial uses, but was used to synthesize the element tennessine. The aqueous compound was painted onto a titanium foil and was bombarded with calcium-48 atoms to synthesize the element tennessine.

This compound is used as a pathway to pentavalent berkelium compounds by the collision-induced dissociation of this compound to produce BkO_{2}(NO_{3})_{2}^{–} which contains berkelium in the +5 oxidation state.
