= Berkelium(III) nitride =

Names
- Other names berkelium mononitride

Identifiers
3D model (JSmol)	Interactive image
- InChI: InChI=1S/Bk.N/q+3;-3 Key: OWTTUVFFEGTQHI-UHFFFAOYSA-N
- SMILES: [Bk+3].[N-3]

Properties
Chemical formula	BkN
Molar mass	261 g·mol^{−1}
- Except where otherwise noted, data are given for materials in their standard state (at 25 °C [77 °F], 100 kPa). Infobox references

Berkelium(III) nitride is a binary inorganic compound of berkelium and nitrogen with the chemical formula BkN.
