= Praseodymium fluoride =

Praseodymium fluoride may refer to:

- Praseodymium(III) fluoride (Praseodymium trifluoride), PrF_{3}
- Praseodymium(IV) fluoride (Praseodymium tetrafluoride), PrF_{4}
