= Ammonium hexafluorouranate =

Names
- Other names Ammonium hexafluorouranate(IV)

Identifiers
CAS Number	17275-65-9
3D model (JSmol)	Interactive image
- InChI: InChI=1S/6FH.2H3N.U/h6*1H;2*1H3;/q;;;;;;;;+4/p-4 Key: ULQJFSVPMBYEIN-UHFFFAOYSA-J
- SMILES: [NH4+].[NH4+].F[U-2](F)(F)(F)(F)F

Properties
Chemical formula	F_{6}H_{8}N_{2}U
Molar mass	388.097 g·mol^{−1}
Appearance	yellow-green crystals
Density	g/cm^{3}
- Except where otherwise noted, data are given for materials in their standard state (at 25 °C [77 °F], 100 kPa). Infobox references

Ammonium hexafluorouranate is an inorganic chemical compound with the chemical formula (NH_{4})_{2}UF_{6}.

== Synthesis ==
Ammonia reduces uranium hexafluoride at room temperature to produce the compound.

== Physical properties ==
Ammonium hexafluorouranate exists in four crystal modifications.
