= Berkelium trihydride =

Names
- Other names Berkelium(III) hydride

Identifiers
3D model (JSmol)	Interactive image
- InChI: InChI=1S/Bk.3H
- SMILES: [BkH3]

Properties
Chemical formula	BkH_{3}
Molar mass	250 g·mol^{−1}
Appearance	solid

Structure
Crystal structure	hexagonal lattice

Related compounds
Related compounds	Americium trihydride Protactinium trihydride
- Except where otherwise noted, data are given for materials in their standard state (at 25 °C [77 °F], 100 kPa). Infobox references

Berkelium trihydride is a binary inorganic compound of berkelium and hydrogen with the chemical formula BkH_{3}. It is a radioactive, solid actinide hydride formed by the direct reaction of berkelium metal with hydrogen gas. The compound is notable for confirming that berkelium exhibits trivalent lanthanide-like behavior in its hydride chemistry, extending the known actinide-hydrogen system through element 97.

== Structure ==
The compound was initially reported by Fahey et al. in the 1970s, who prepared a face-centered cubic hydride phase and identified it as a dihydride (BkH₂₊ₓ). The existence of a trihydride phase was later confirmed and characterized in detail by Gibson et al. in 1985 through X-ray powder diffraction studies. The 1985 study established the hexagonal structure of BkH_{3} and demonstrated that berkelium follows the trivalent lanthanide pattern in hydride formation.

Berkelium trihydride crystallizes in a hexagonal lattice with space group symmetry analogous to other trivalent actinide and lanthanide trihydrides. The lattice parameters reported by Gibson et al. are a₀ = 0.3726(7) nm and c₀ = 0.6663(20) nm, giving a c/a ratio of 1.788(9).

== Synthesis ==
Berkelium trihydride is prepared by the direct reaction of berkelium metal with hydrogen gas at elevated temperatures. The synthesis typically produces a mixture of phases. The reaction is conducted at temperatures above 250 °C, though studies by Gibson et al. used temperatures below 300 °C.

Berkelium trihydride can also serve as a precursor for the synthesis of other berkelium compounds, such as berkelium pnictides (BkX, where X = N, P, As, Sb), which are prepared by reacting BkH_{3} with the corresponding elements under high vacuum at elevated temperatures.
