= Americium hexafluoride =

Names
- Other names Americium(VI) fluoride

Identifiers
CAS Number	90116-77-1
3D model (JSmol)	Interactive image
- InChI: InChI=1S/Am.6FH/h;6*1H/q+6;;;;;;/p-6 Key: MOPXCOMYGFTBPM-UHFFFAOYSA-H
- SMILES: F[Am](F)(F)(F)(F)F

Properties
Chemical formula	AmF_{6}
Molar mass	357 g·mol^{−1}

Related compounds
Related compounds	Uranium hexafluoride Curium hexafluoride Einsteinium hexafluoride
- Except where otherwise noted, data are given for materials in their standard state (at 25 °C [77 °F], 100 kPa). Infobox references

Americium hexafluoride is a hypothetical inorganic chemical compound of americium and fluorine with the chemical formula AmF_{6}. Synthesis by fluorination of americium tetrafluoride was unsuccessfully attempted in 1990. A thermochromatographic identification in 1986 remains inconclusive. Calculations suggest that it may be distorted from octahedral symmetry.

== Synthesis ==
It is proposed that AmF_{6} can be prepared by in both the condensed and gaseous states by the reaction of KrF_{2} with AmF_{3} in anhydrous HF at 313–333 K.

2 AmF_{3} + 3 KrF_{2} → 2 AmF_{6} + 3 Kr
