= Berkelium(III) fluoride =

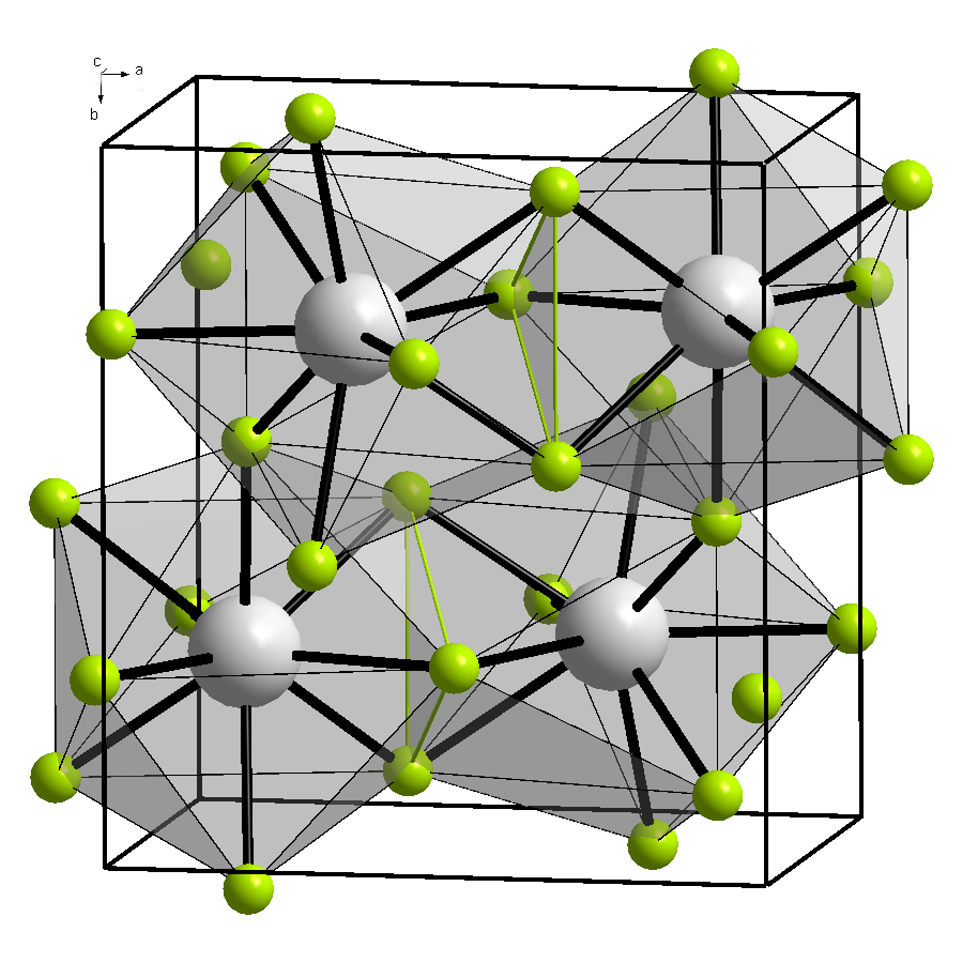

Names
- Other names berkelium trifluoride

Identifiers
CAS Number	20716-88-5
3D model (JSmol)	Interactive image
ChemSpider	^{249}Bk: 64886344
- InChI: InChI=1S/Bk.3FH/h;3*1H/q+3;;;/p-3 Key: DAFXIOTWBMWEKP-UHFFFAOYSA-K
- SMILES: [Bk+3].[F-].[F-].[F-]

Properties
Chemical formula	BkF_{3}
Molar mass	304 g·mol^{−1}
Appearance	yellow-green solid
Density	9.70 g/cm^{3}

Related compounds
Related compounds	Berkelium tetrafluoride Einsteinium(III) fluoride
- Except where otherwise noted, data are given for materials in their standard state (at 25 °C [77 °F], 100 kPa). Infobox references

Berkelium(III) fluoride is a binary inorganic compound of berkelium and fluorine with the chemical formula BkF_{3}.

== Synthesis ==
The compound can be prepared by treating Bk_{2}O_{3} with a gaseous mixture of H_{2} and HF at 600 °C.

== Physical properties ==
Berkelium trifluoride forms a yellow-green solid with two structures. At low temperature, it is orthorhombic (YF_{3} structure), with lattice parameters a = 670 pm, b = 709 pm, and c = 441 pm. At high temperature, it is trigonal (LaF_{3} structure), with lattice parameters a = 697 pm and c = 714 pm. The transition temperature of BkF_{3} is between 350 and 600 °C.

== Chemical properties ==
Berkelium trifluoride is reduced by lithium to obtain metallic berkelium:

BkF_{3} + 3Li → Bk + 3LiF
