= Americium nitride =

Names
- Other names Americium mononitride, azanylidyneamericium

Identifiers
3D model (JSmol)	Interactive image
- InChI: InChI=1S/Am.N Key: GWSIEJPULFRSMU-UHFFFAOYSA-N
- SMILES: [Am]#N

Properties
Chemical formula	AmN
Molar mass	257 g·mol^{−1}
- Except where otherwise noted, data are given for materials in their standard state (at 25 °C [77 °F], 100 kPa). Infobox references

Americium nitride is a binary inorganic compound of americium and nitride with the chemical formula AmN.

== Preparation ==
Americium can be obtained from the reaction of metallic americium with nitrogen or ammonia at 750–800°C:

2Am + N_{2} → 2AmN
2Am + 2NH_{3} → 2AmN + 3H_{2}

It can also be obtained from the reaction of americium trihydride (AmH_{3}) with nitrogen at 750 °C:

AmH_{3} + N_{2} → AmN + NH_{3}

== Chemical properties ==
Americium nitride reacts with cadmium chloride to form americium trichloride:

2 AmN + 3 CdCl_{2} → 2 AmCl_{3} + Cd_{3}N_{2}
