= Uranium(IV) compounds =

Uranium cation

Uranous is the chemical term for the reduced tetrapositive cation of uranium that exhibits the valence U^{4+}. It is one of the two common ionic states of uranium found in nature, the other being the oxidised hexapositive ion called uranyl. Uranous compounds are usually unstable; they revert to the oxidised form on exposure to air.

Examples of these compounds include salts such as uranium tetrachloride (UCl_{4}) and uranium tetrafluoride (UF_{4}), which are important in molten salt reactor applications, and uranium dioxide (UO_{2}), a common form of nuclear fuel.

The solvated U^{4+} ion is normally not present in water. Most of the compounds like UCl_{4} are better described with the covalent bond than an ionic bond.

Minerals containing the uranous ion are more subdued in colour, typically brown or black, and occur in reducing environments. Common uranous minerals include uraninite and coffinite.
