= Berkelium(III) chloride =

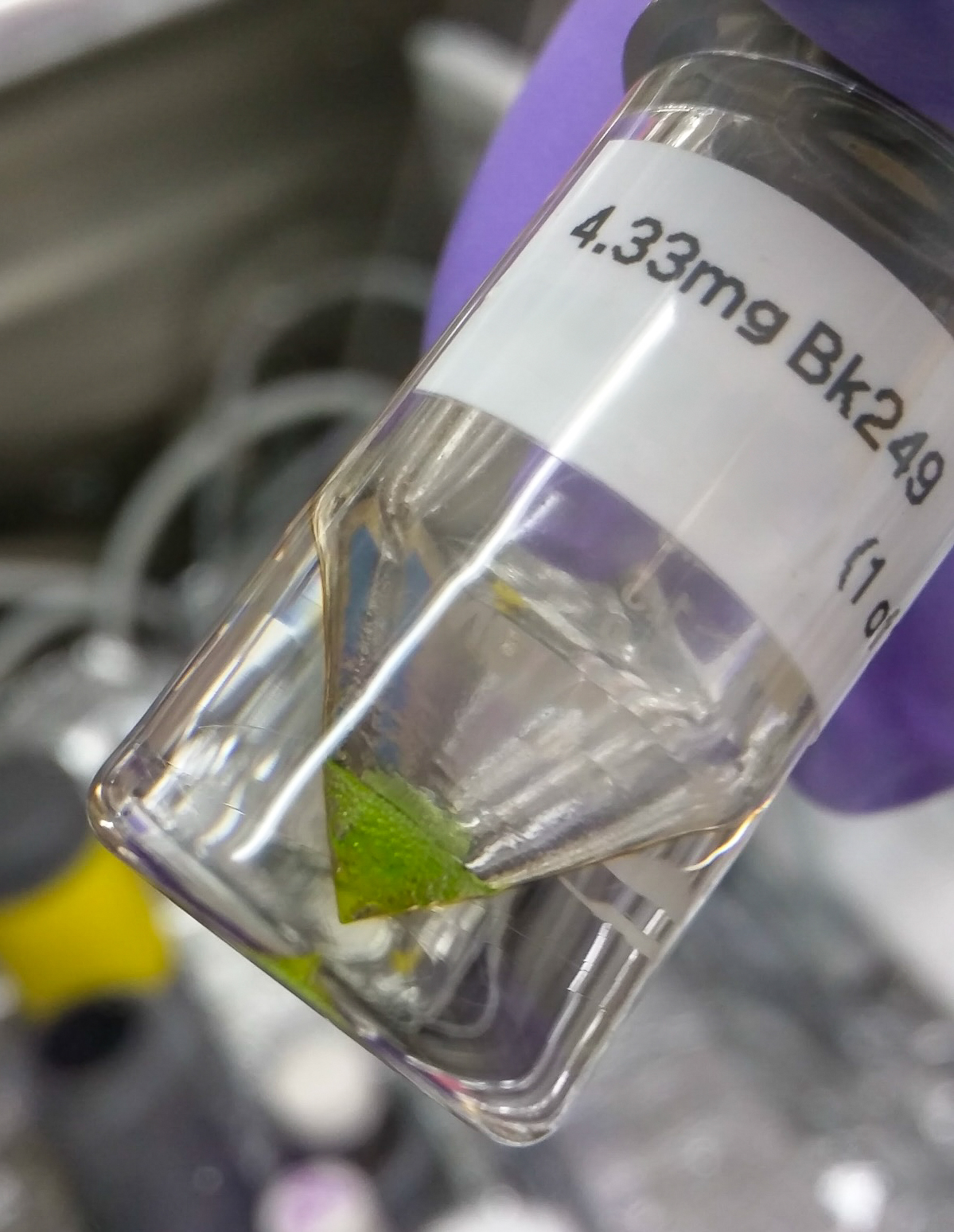

Names
- Other names: Berkelium trichloride

Identifiers
CAS Number	20063-16-5
3D model (JSmol)	Interactive image
- InChI: InChI=1S/Bk.3ClH/h;3*1H/p-3 Key: IZRUUNBZXOYLEH-UHFFFAOYSA-K
- SMILES: [Cl-].[Cl-].[Cl-].[Bk+3]

Properties
Chemical formula	BkCl_{3}
Molar mass	353.36 g/mol
Appearance	Green solid
Melting point	603 °C (1,117 °F; 876 K)
Solubility in water	Soluble

Structure
Crystal structure	Hexagonal
Space group	P_{6}3/m
- Except where otherwise noted, data are given for materials in their standard state (at 25 °C [77 °F], 100 kPa). Infobox references

Berkelium(III) chloride also known as berkelium trichloride, is a binary inorganic compound of berkelium and chlorine with the formula BkCl_{3}. It is a water-soluble green salt with a melting point of 603 °C. This compound forms the hexahydrate, BkCl_{3}·6H_{2}O.

== Preparation and reactions ==
This compound was first prepared in 1970 by reacting hydrogen chloride gas and berkelium(IV) oxide or berkelium(III) oxide at 520 °C:

Bk_{2}O_{3} + 6HCl → 2BkCl_{3} + 3H_{2}O

Berkelium(III) chloride reacts with beryllocene to produce berkelocene(Bk(C_{5}H_{5})_{3}). It also reacts with oxalic acid to produce berkelium oxalate. This reaction is used to purify this compound, by reacting the oxalate with hydrochloric acid.

== Structure ==
Anhydrous berkelium(III) chloride has a hexagonal crystal structure, is isostructural to uranium trichloride, and has the person symbol hP6. When heated it its melting point, it converts to an orthorhombic phase. However, the hexahydrate has a monoclinic crystal structure and is isostructural to americium trichloride hexahydrate with the lattice constants a = 966 pm, b = 654 pm and c = 797 pm. This hexahydrate consists of BkCl_{2}(OH_{2})_{6}^{+} ions and Cl^{−} ions.

== Complexes ==
Caesium sodium berkelium chloride is known with the formula Cs_{2}NaBkCl_{6} and is produced by the reaction of berkelium(III) hydroxide, hydrochloric acid, and caesium chloride.
