= Mercury(IV) fluoride =

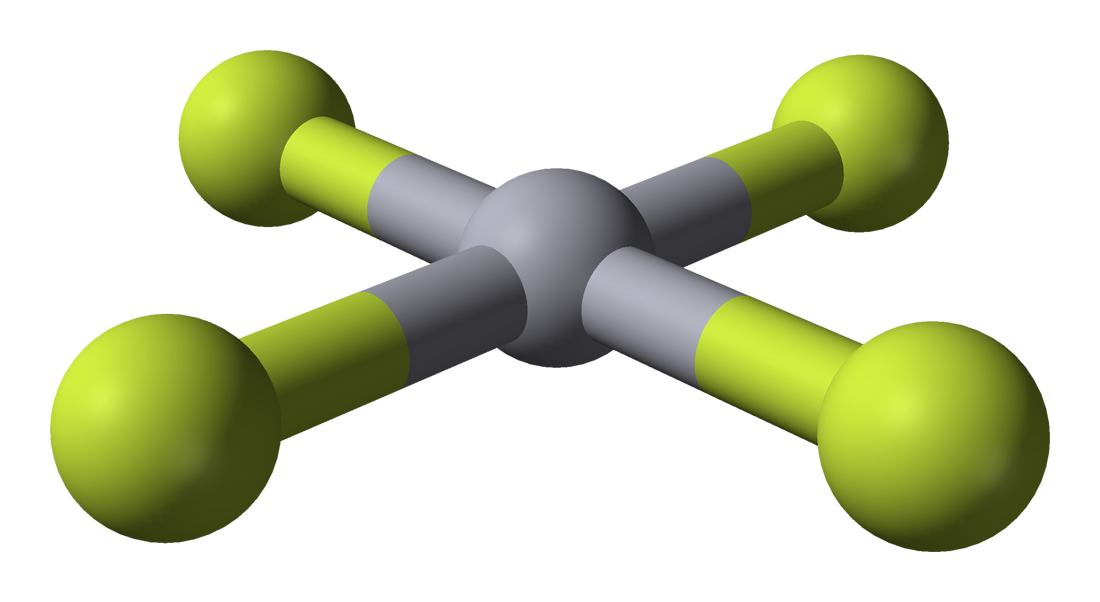

Identifiers
3D model (JSmol)	Interactive image
- InChI: InChI=1S/4FH.Hg/h4*1H;/q;;;;+4/p-4 Key: JYXOXCXRRXEIOL-UHFFFAOYSA-J
- SMILES: F[Hg](F)(F)F

Properties
Chemical formula	HgF_{4}
Molar mass	276.58 g/mol
- Except where otherwise noted, data are given for materials in their standard state (at 25 °C [77 °F], 100 kPa). verify (what is ?) Infobox references

Mercury(IV) fluoride, HgF_{4}, is a purported compound, the first to be reported with mercury in the +4 oxidation state. Mercury, like the other group 12 elements (cadmium and zinc), has an s^{2}d^{10} electron configuration and generally only forms bonds involving its 6s orbital. This means that the highest oxidation state mercury normally attains is +2, and for this reason it is sometimes considered a post-transition metal instead of a transition metal. HgF_{4} was first reported from experiments in 2007, but its existence remains disputed; experiments conducted in 2008 could not replicate the compound.

== History ==
Speculation about higher oxidation states for mercury had existed since the 1970s, and theoretical calculations in the 1990s predicted that it should be stable in the gas phase, with a square-planar geometry consistent with a formal d^{8} configuration. However, experimental proof remained elusive until 2007, when HgF_{4} was first prepared using solid neon and argon for matrix isolation at a temperature of 4 K. The compound was detected using infrared spectroscopy.

However, the compound's synthesis has not been replicated in other labs, and more recent theoretical studies cast doubt on the possible existence of mercury(IV) (and copernicium(IV)) fluoride. Dirac–Hartree–Fock computations including both relativistic effects and electron correlation suggest that an HgF_{4} compound would be unbound by about 2 eV (and CnF_{4} by 14 eV).

== Explanation ==
Theoretical studies suggest that mercury is unique among the natural elements of group 12 in forming a tetrafluoride, and attribute this observation to relativistic effects. According to calculations, the tetrafluorides of the "less relativistic" elements cadmium and zinc are unstable and eliminate a fluorine molecule, F_{2}, to form the metal difluoride complex. On the other hand, the tetrafluoride of the "more relativistic" synthetic element 112, copernicium, is predicted to be more stable.

Subsequent density functional theory and coupled cluster calculations indicated that bonding in HgF_{4} (if it really exists) involves d orbitals. This has led to the suggestion that mercury should be considered a transition metal (the group 12 metals are sometimes excluded from the transition metals because they do not oxidize beyond +2). Chemical historian William B. Jensen has argued that the compound alone is insufficient to reclassify the metal, because HgF_{4} represents at best a non-equilibrium transient state.

== Purported synthesis and properties ==
HgF_{4} is claimed to be produced by the reaction of elemental mercury with fluorine:

Hg + 2 F_{2} → HgF_{4}

HgF_{4} is claimed to be only stable in matrix isolation at 4 K (−269 °C); upon heating, or if the HgF_{4} molecules touch each other, it decomposes to mercury(II) fluoride and fluorine:

HgF_{4} → HgF_{2} + F_{2}

HgF_{4} is a diamagnetic, square planar molecule. The mercury atom has a formal 6s^{2}5d^{8}6p^{6} electron configuration, and as such obeys the octet rule but not the 18-electron rule. HgF_{4} is isoelectronic with the tetrafluoroaurate anion, AuF^{−}_{4}, and is valence isoelectronic with the tetrachloroaurate (AuCl^{−}_{4}), tetrabromoaurate (AuBr^{−}_{4}), and tetrachloroplatinate (PtCl^{2−}_{4}) anions.
