= Berkelium(III) iodide =

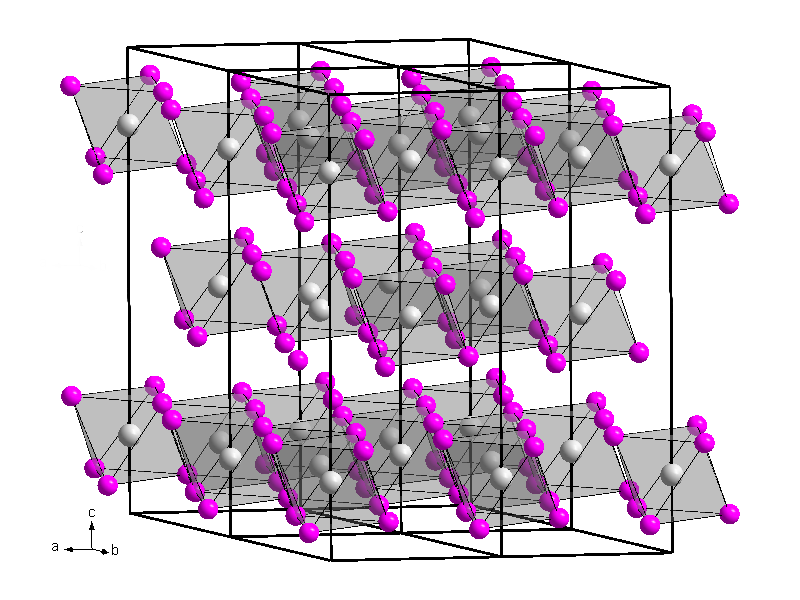

Names
- Other names berkelium triiodide

Identifiers
CAS Number	23171-53-1
3D model (JSmol)	Interactive image
ChemSpider	64886032
PubChem CID	129660023
- InChI: InChI=1S/Bk.3HI/h;3*1H/q+3;;;/p-3 Key: HQJHQZJIELHZEV-UHFFFAOYSA-K
- SMILES: [Bk+3].[I-].[I-].[I-]

Properties
Chemical formula	BkI_{3}
Molar mass	628 g·mol^{−1}
Appearance	yellow solid
Density	g/cm^{3}
Boiling point	650 °C (1,202 °F; 923 K)

Structure
Crystal structure	trigonal

Hazards
- Occupational safety and health (OHS/OSH)
Main hazards	Radioactive
- Except where otherwise noted, data are given for materials in their standard state (at 25 °C [77 °F], 100 kPa). Infobox references

Berkelium(III) iodide is a binary inorganic compound of berkelium and iodine with the chemical formula BkI_{3}.

== Synthesis ==
Synthesis of berkelium(III) iodide is by action of hydrogen iodine on berkelium oxide at 650 °C.

== Physical properties ==
Berkelium triiodide forms a yellow solid of the trigonal crystal system, space group R3 (No. 148), lattice parameters a = 758.4 pm and c = 2087 pm. Its crystal structure is the same as that of bismuth triiodide.
