= Uranium hexafluoride =

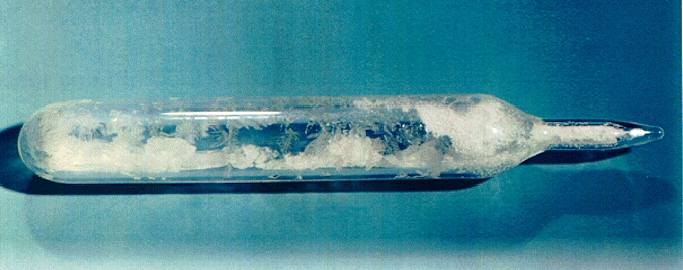

Names
- IUPAC names Uranium hexafluoride Uranium(VI) fluoride

Identifiers
CAS Number	7783-81-5
3D model (JSmol)	Interactive image
Abbreviations	hex
ChEBI	CHEBI:30235
ChemSpider	22966
ECHA InfoCard	100.029.116
EC Number	232-028-6
Gmelin Reference	2923
PubChem CID	24560
RTECS number	YR4720000
UNII	N06GJ1D94J
UN number	2978 (<1% ^{235}U); 2977 (>1% ^{235}U)
CompTox Dashboard (EPA)	DTXSID4074566
- InChI: InChI=1S/6FH.U/h6*1H;/q;;;;;;+6/p-6 Key: SANRKQGLYCLAFE-UHFFFAOYSA-H; InChI=1/6FH.U/h6*1H;/q;;;;;;+6/p-6/rF6U/c1-7(2,3,4,5)6 Key: SANRKQGLYCLAFE-IIYYNVFAAT
- SMILES: F[U](F)(F)(F)(F)F

Properties
Chemical formula	UF_{6}
Molar mass	352.02 g/mol
Appearance	Colorless solid
Density	5.09 g/cm^{3}, solid
Boiling point	56.5 °C (133.7 °F; 329.6 K) (sublimes, at atmospheric pressure)
Solubility in water	Hydrolyzes
Solubility	Soluble in chloroform, CCl_{4}, liquid chlorine, and bromine; Dissolves in nitrobenzene; 151 kPa

Structure
Crystal structure	Orthorhombic, oP28
Space group	Pnma, No. 62
Coordination geometry	Octahedral (O_{h})
Dipole moment	0

Thermochemistry
Std molar entropy (S^{⦵}_{298})	Solid, 227.8±1.3 J K^{−1} mol^{−1}; Gaseous, 377.8±1.3 J K^{−1} mol^{−1}
Std enthalpy of formation (Δ_{f}H^{⦵}_{298})	Solid, −2197.7±1.8 kJ mol^{−1}; Gaseous, −2148.1±1.8 kJ mol^{−1}

Hazards
- Occupational safety and health (OHS/OSH)
Main hazards	Toxic, corrosive, radioactive
- GHS labelling
Pictograms	(GHS06: Toxic) (GHS08: Health hazard) (GHS09: Environmental hazard)
Signal word	Danger
Hazard statements	H300, H330, H373, H411
NFPA 704 (fire diamond)	4 0 2 W; OX
Flash point	Non-flammable
Safety data sheet (SDS)	ICSC 1250

Related compounds
Other anions	Uranium hexachloride
Other cations	Neptunium hexafluoride; Plutonium hexafluoride; Americium hexafluoride; Curium hexafluoride; Tungsten hexafluoride
Related uranium fluorides	Uranium(III) fluoride; Uranium(IV) fluoride; Uranium(V) fluoride
- Except where otherwise noted, data are given for materials in their standard state (at 25 °C [77 °F], 100 kPa). verify (what is ?) Infobox references

Uranium hexafluoride, sometimes called hex, is an inorganic compound with the formula UF_{6}. Uranium hexafluoride is a volatile, white solid that is used in enriching uranium for nuclear reactors and nuclear weapons.

== Preparation ==
Uranium dioxide is converted with hydrofluoric acid (HF) to uranium tetrafluoride:

UO_{2} + 4 HF → UF_{4} + 2 H_{2}O

The resulting UF_{4} is subsequently oxidized with fluorine to give the hexafluoride:

UF_{4} + F_{2} → UF_{6}

In samples contaminated with uranium trioxide, uranyl fluoride, an oxyfluoride compound is produced in the HF step:

UO_{3} + 2 HF → UO_{2}F_{2} + H_{2}O

which can be fluorinated to produce the same product, uranium hexafluoride.

UO_{2}F_{2} + 2 F_{2} → UF_{6} + O_{2}

The fluorination steps in both reactions above are highly exothermic.

== Properties ==
=== Physical properties ===
At atmospheric pressure, UF_{6} sublimes at 56.5 °C.

The solid-state structure was determined by neutron diffraction at 77 K and 293 K.

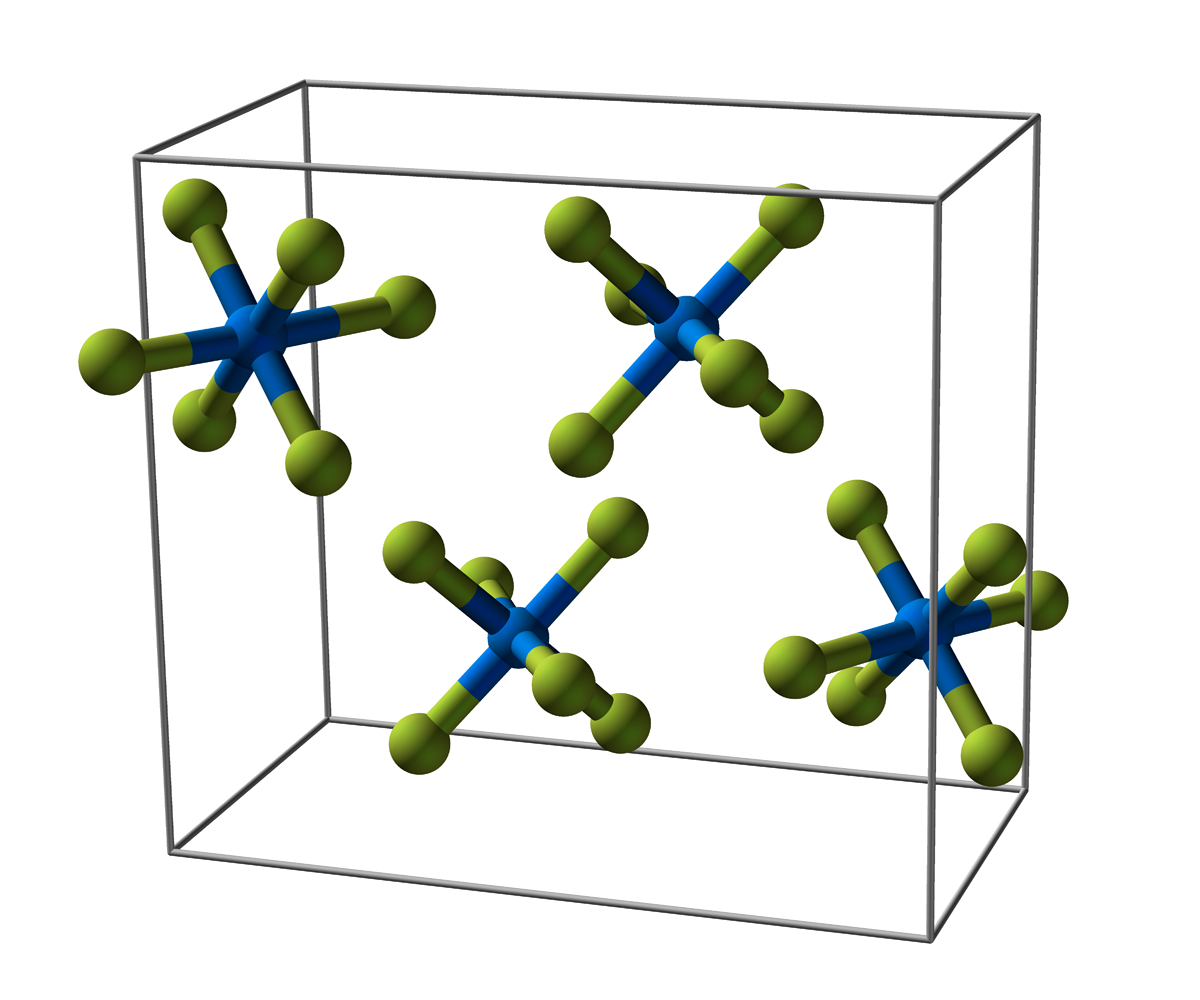
Packing of UF_{6} in its unit cell.

=== Chemical properties ===
UF_{6} reacts with water, releasing hydrofluoric acid. The compound reacts with aluminium, forming a surface layer of AlF_{3} that resists any further reaction from the compound.

Uranium hexafluoride is a mild oxidant. It is a Lewis acid as evidenced by its binding to form heptafluorouranate(VI), [UF_{7}]^{−}.

Polymeric uranium(VI) fluorides containing organic cations have been isolated and characterized by X-ray diffraction.

== Application in the fuel cycle ==
Phase diagram of UF_{6}

As one of the most volatile compounds of uranium, uranium hexafluoride is relatively convenient to process and is used in both of the main uranium enrichment methods, namely gaseous diffusion and the gas centrifuge process. Since the triple point of UF_{6}, which is 64 °C (147 °F; 337 K) and 152 kPa (22 psi; 1.5 atm), is close to ambient conditions, phase transitions can be achieved with little thermodynamic work.

Fluorine has only a single naturally occurring stable isotope, so isotopologues of UF_{6} differ in their molecular weight based solely on the uranium isotope present. This difference is the basis for the physical separation of isotopes in enrichment.

All the other uranium fluorides are nonvolatile solids that are coordination polymers.

The conversion factor for the ^{238}U isotopologue of UF_{6} ("hex") to "U mass" is 0.676.

Gaseous diffusion requires about 60 times as much energy as the gas centrifuge process: gaseous diffusion-produced nuclear fuel produces 25 times more energy than is used in the diffusion process, while centrifuge-produced fuel produces 1,500 times more energy than is used in the centrifuge process.

In addition to its use in enrichment, uranium hexafluoride has been used in an advanced reprocessing method (fluoride volatility), which was developed in the Czech Republic. In this process, spent nuclear fuel is treated with fluorine gas to transform the oxides or elemental metals into a mixture of fluorides. This mixture is then distilled to separate the different classes of material. Some fission products form nonvolatile fluorides which remain as solids and can then either be prepared for storage as nuclear waste or further processed either by solvation-based methods or electrochemically.

Uranium enrichment produces large quantities of depleted uranium hexafluoride (DUF_{6} or D-UF_{6}) as a waste product. The long-term storage of D-UF_{6} presents environmental, health, and safety risks because of its chemical instability. When UF_{6} is exposed to moist air, it reacts with the water in the air to produce UO_{2}F_{2} (uranyl fluoride) and HF (hydrogen fluoride) both of which are highly corrosive and toxic. In 2005, about 686,000 tonnes of D-UF_{6} was housed in 57,122 storage cylinders located near Portsmouth, Ohio; Oak Ridge, Tennessee; and Paducah, Kentucky. Storage cylinders must be regularly inspected for signs of corrosion and leaks. The estimated lifetime of the steel cylinders is measured in decades.

== Accidents and disposal ==
There have been several accidents involving uranium hexafluoride in the US, including a cylinder-filling accident and material release at the Sequoyah Fuels Corporation in 1986 where an estimated 29,500 lb (13,400 kg) of gaseous UF_{6} escaped. The US government has been converting DUF_{6} to solid uranium oxides for disposal. Such disposal of the entire DUF_{6} stockpile could cost anywhere from $15 million to $450 million.

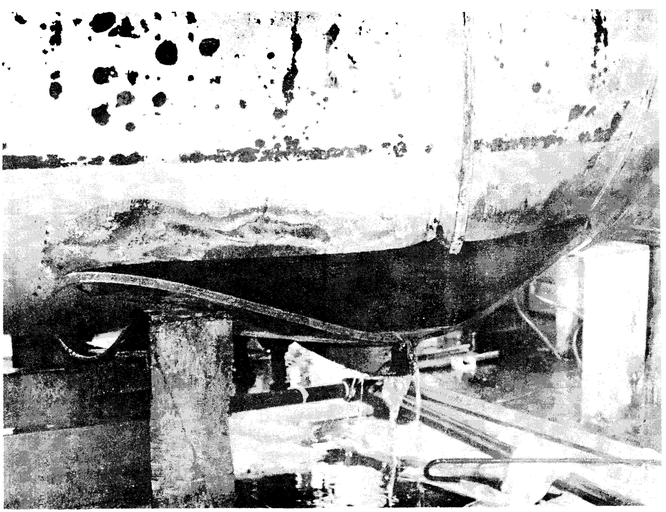
Ruptured 14-ton UF_{6} shipping cylinder. 1 fatality, dozens injured. ~29,500 lb (13,400 kg) of material released. Sequoyah Fuels Corporation 1986.

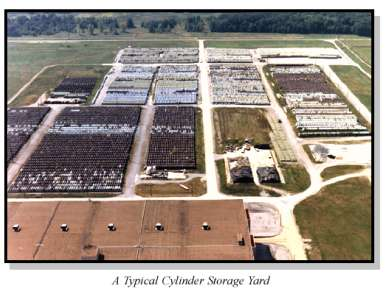
DUF_{6} storage yard from afar

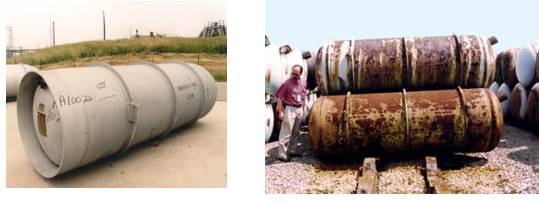
DUF_{6} cylinders: painted (left) and corroded (right)

== See also ==
- Enriched uranium
- Hexafluorouranate
