= Americium trihydride =

Names
- Other names Americium hydride

Identifiers
CAS Number	13774-24-8
3D model (JSmol)	Interactive image
- InChI: InChI=1S/Am.3H Key: BXJLKKMHMQLURG-UHFFFAOYSA-N
- SMILES: [Am+3].[H-].[H-].[H-]

Properties
Chemical formula	AmH_{3}
Molar mass	246 g·mol^{−1}
Density	9/76 g/cm^{3}

Related compounds
Related compounds	Berkelium trihydride
- Except where otherwise noted, data are given for materials in their standard state (at 25 °C [77 °F], 100 kPa). Infobox references

Americium trihydride is a binary inorganic compound of americium and hydrogen with the chemical formula AmH_{3}.

== Physical properties ==
The compound crystalyzes with a hexagonal crystal structure. It is stable at low temperatures.

== Chemical properties ==
Reaction of americium trihydride with nitrogen at 750 °C produces americium nitride:

AmH_{3} + N_{2} → AmN + NH_{3}
