= Berkelium(III) oxide =

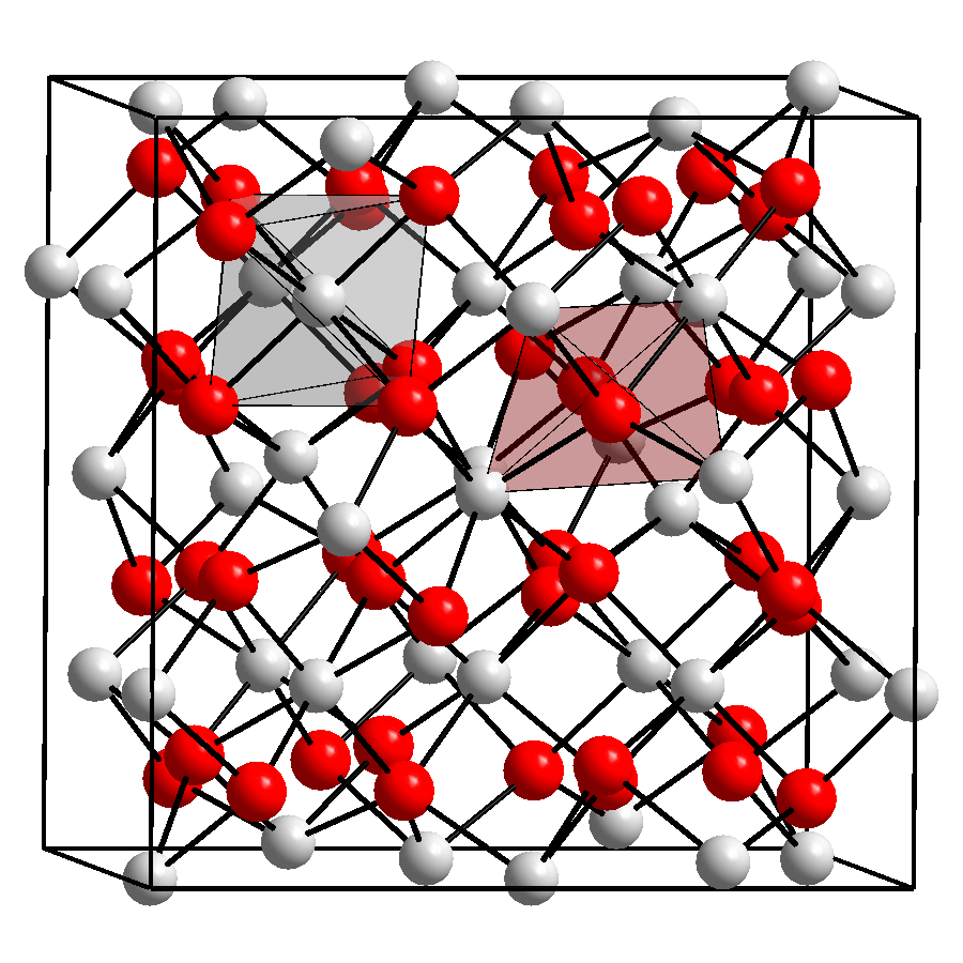

Names
- Other names diberkelium trioxide, berkelium sequioxide

Identifiers
CAS Number	12310-58-6
3D model (JSmol)	Interactive image
- InChI: InChI=1S/2Bk.3O/q2*+3;3*-2 Key: LIPRULCJHNQYDI-UHFFFAOYSA-N
- SMILES: [Bk+3].[Bk+3].[O-2].[O-2].[O-2]

Properties
Chemical formula	Bk_{2}O_{3}
Molar mass	542 g·mol^{−1}
Appearance	yellow-green solid
Density	g/cm^{3}
Melting point	1,920 °C (3,490 °F; 2,190 K)
Solubility in water	insoluble

Structure
Crystal structure	cubic

Related compounds
Related compounds	Californium(III) oxide
- Except where otherwise noted, data are given for materials in their standard state (at 25 °C [77 °F], 100 kPa). Infobox references

Berkelium(III) oxide is a binary inorganic compound of berkelium and oxygen with the chemical formula Bk_{2}O_{3}.

== Synthesis ==
Berkelium(III) oxide can be prepared from berkelium(IV) oxide by reduction with hydrogen:

2BkO_{2} + H_{2} → Bk_{2}O_{3} + H_{2}O

== Physical properties ==
The compound forms a yellow-green solid with a melting point of 1920 °C. It forms a body-centered cubic crystal lattice with a = 1088.0 ± 0.5 pm.

Insoluble in water.
