= Berkelium tetrafluoride =

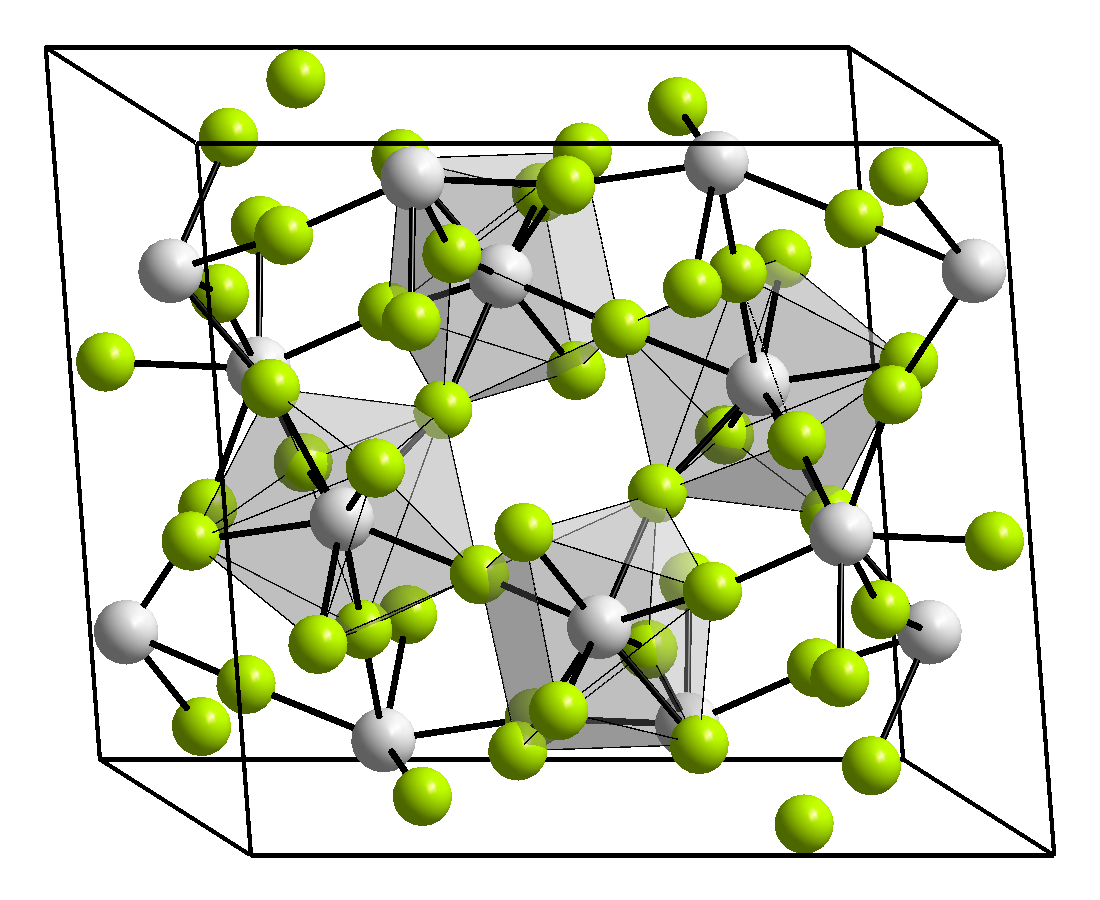

Names
- Other names berkelium(IV) fluoride

Identifiers
CAS Number	22422-27-1
3D model (JSmol)	Interactive image
- InChI: InChI=1S/Bk.4FH/h;4*1H/q+4;;;;/p-4 Key: RCTCKHUWZHELJP-UHFFFAOYSA-J
- SMILES: [Bk+4].[F-].[F-].[F-].[F-]

Properties
Chemical formula	BkF_{4}
Molar mass	323 g·mol^{−1}
Appearance	yellow-green solid
Solubility in water	practically insoluble

Structure
Crystal structure	monoclinic

Related compounds
Related compounds	Curium(III) fluoride, berkelium trifluoride
- Except where otherwise noted, data are given for materials in their standard state (at 25 °C [77 °F], 100 kPa). Infobox references

Berkelium tetrafluoride is a binary inorganic compound of berkelium and fluorine with the chemical formula BkF_{4}.

== Synthesis ==
Berkelium tetrafluoride may be formed by the fluorination of berkelium trioxide, dioxide, or trifluoride with elemental fluorine at elevated temperatures:

2Bk_{2}O_{3} + 8F_{2} → 4BkF_{4} + 3O_{2}
2BkF_{3} + F_{2} → 2BkF_{4}

== Physical properties ==
Berkelium(IV) fluoride forms light brown crystals of monoclinic crystal structure of uranium tetrafluoride type. Cell parameters: a = 1.2396 nm, b = 1.0466 nm, c = 0.8118 nm, angle β = 126.33°.

== Chemical properties ==
Berkelium tetrafluoride is reduced by lithium at elevated temperatures to metallic berkelium:

BkF_{4} + 4Li → Bk + 4LiF
