= Einsteinium hexafluoride =

Names
- Other names Einsteinium(VI) fluoride

Identifiers
| CAS Number | 67620-36-4 |
| 3D model (JSmol) | Interactive image |
- InChI: InChI=1S/Es.6FH/h;6*1H/q+6;;;;;;/p-6 Key: XDVFQSVXFYEDNB-UHFFFAOYSA-H
- SMILES: [Es+6].[F-].[F-].[F-].[F-].[F-].[F-]

Properties
| Chemical formula | EsF_{6} |
| Molar mass | 366 g·mol^{−1} |

Related compounds
| Related compounds | Curium hexafluoride Americium hexafluoride |
- Except where otherwise noted, data are given for materials in their standard state (at 25 °C [77 °F], 100 kPa). Infobox references

Einsteinium hexafluoride is a binary inorganic chemical compound of einsteinium and fluorine with the chemical formula EsF_{6}. This is a hypothetical compound—its existence has been predicted theoretically, but the compound has yet to be isolated.

== Physical properties ==
It is unlikely that the compound is stable.
