= Californium(IV) oxide =

Names
- Other names Californium dioxide

Identifiers
CAS Number	12015-10-0
3D model (JSmol)	Interactive image
ChemSpider	64885445
ECHA InfoCard	100.031.448
EC Number	234-606-3
- InChI: InChI=1S/Cf.2O/q+4;2*-2 Key: LCCVNIITEFXFMU-UHFFFAOYSA-N
- SMILES: [Cf+4].[O-2].[O-2]

Properties
Chemical formula	CfO_{2}
Molar mass	283 g·mol^{−1}
Appearance	Black-brown solid
Density	g/cm^{3}
Solubility in water	Insoluble

Structure
Crystal structure	cubic

Related compounds
Related compounds	Berkelium dioxide, dicalifornium trioxide
- Except where otherwise noted, data are given for materials in their standard state (at 25 °C [77 °F], 100 kPa). Infobox references

Californium(IV) oxide, also called californium dioxide, is a binary inorganic compound of californium and oxygen with the chemical formula CfO_{2}.

== Synthesis ==
Californium dioxide is produced by oxidizing californium with molecular and atomic oxygen at high pressure.

== Physical properties ==
Californium(IV) oxide is a black-brown solid that has a cubic fluorite crystal structure with a lattice parameter, the distance between unit cells in the crystal, of 531.0 ± 0.2 picometers (pm) (530.8 - 531.2).
