= Einsteinium tetrafluoride =

Names
- Other names Einsteinium(IV) fluoride

Identifiers
CAS Number	74833-99-1
3D model (JSmol)	Interactive image
- InChI: InChI=1S/Es.4FH/h;4*1H/q+4;;;;/p-4 Key: IUMDLUONUYWEGQ-UHFFFAOYSA-J
- SMILES: [Es+4].[F-].[F-].[F-].[F-]

Properties
Chemical formula	EsF_{4}
Molar mass	328 g·mol^{−1}

Related compounds
Related compounds	Curium(IV) fluoride Berkelium(IV) fluoride
- Except where otherwise noted, data are given for materials in their standard state (at 25 °C [77 °F], 100 kPa). Infobox references

Einsteinium tetrafluoride is a binary inorganic chemical compound of einsteinium and fluorine with the chemical formula EsF_{4}. The compound was observed by thermochromatography.

== Synthesis ==
The compound can be prepared via fluorination of einsteinium trifluoride.

2EsF_{3} + F_{2} → 2EsF_{4}

== Physical properties ==
The compound is volatile. Volatility is comparable to that of other transuranium tetrafluorides.
