= Praseodymium(IV) fluoride =

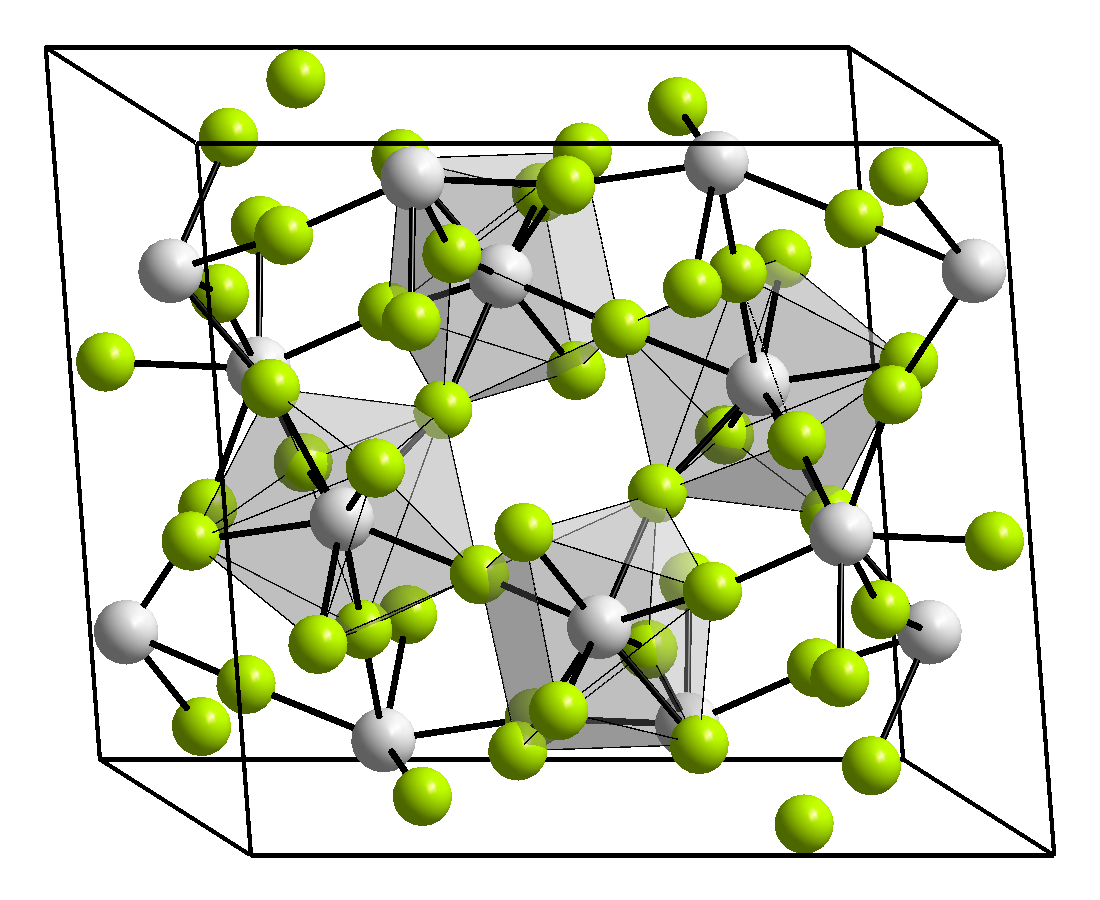

Names
- Other names tetrafluoropraseodymium, praseodymium tetrafluoride

Identifiers
CAS Number	15192-24-2
3D model (JSmol)	Interactive image
ChemSpider	9588184
PubChem CID	11413297
CompTox Dashboard (EPA)	DTXSID201336913
- InChI: InChI=1S/4FH.Pr/h4*1H;/q;;;;+4/p-4 Key: AQHKOMUMLGCMJB-UHFFFAOYSA-J
- SMILES: F[Pr](F)(F)F

Properties
Chemical formula	F_{4}Pr
Molar mass	216.90127 g·mol^{−1}
Appearance	light-yellow crystals
Density	g/cm^{3}
Solubility in water	reacts with water

Hazards
- GHS labelling
Pictograms	(GHS07: Exclamation mark)
Signal word	Warning

Related compounds
Other cations	CeF_{4}
- Except where otherwise noted, data are given for materials in their standard state (at 25 °C [77 °F], 100 kPa). Infobox references

Praseodymium(IV) fluoride (also praseodymium tetrafluoride) is a binary inorganic compound, a highly oxidised metal salt of praseodymium and fluoride with the chemical formula PrF_{4}.

== Synthesis ==
Praseodymium(IV) fluoride can be prepared by the effect of krypton difluoride on praseodymium(IV) oxide:

$$\mathsf{ PrO_2 + 2 KrF_2 \ \xrightarrow{}\ PrF_4 + O_2 + 2 Kr }$$

Praseodymium(IV) fluoride can also be made by the dissolution of sodium hexafluoropraseodymate(IV) in liquid hydrogen fluoride:

$$\mathsf{ Na_2[PrF_6] + 2 HF \ \xrightarrow{}\ PrF_4\downarrow + 2 NaHF_2 }$$

== Properties ==
Praseodymium(IV) fluoride forms light yellow crystals. The crystal structure is anticubic and isomorphic to that of uranium tetrafluoride UF_{4}. It decomposes when heated:

$$\mathsf{ 2 PrF_4 \ \xrightarrow{90^oC}\ 2 PrF_3 + F_2 }$$

Due to the high normal potential of the tetravalent praseodymium cations (Pr3+ / Pr4+: +3.2 V), praseodymium(IV) fluoride decomposes in water, releasing oxygen, O_{2}.

== See also ==
- Praseodymium(III) fluoride
- Uranium tetrafluoride
