= Californium(III) oxide =

Names
- Other names Californium sesquioxide, dicalifornium trioxide

Identifiers
CAS Number	12050-91-8
3D model (JSmol)	Interactive image
ChemSpider	^{252}Cf: 32698947
- InChI: InChI=1S/2Cf.3O/q2*+3;3*-2 Key: BZGNRENQZZWCKH-UHFFFAOYSA-N
- SMILES: [Cf+3].[Cf+3].[O-2].[O-2].[O-2]

Properties
Chemical formula	Cf_{2}O_{3}
Molar mass	550 g·mol^{−1}
Appearance	yellow-green solid
Melting point	1,750 °C (3,180 °F; 2,020 K)
Solubility in water	insoluble

Structure
Crystal structure	orthorhombic

Related compounds
Related compounds	Californium dioxide

Hazards
- Occupational safety and health (OHS/OSH)
Main hazards	radioactive
- Except where otherwise noted, data are given for materials in their standard state (at 25 °C [77 °F], 100 kPa). Infobox references

Californium(III) oxide is a binary inorganic compound of californium and oxygen with the formula Cf_{2}O_{3}. It is one of the first obtained solid compounds of californium, synthesized in 1958.

== Synthesis ==
The compound can be prepared by burning ionite in air, on which ions of trivalent californium are sorbed, at a temperature of 1400 °C. It can also be obtained by β-decay of berkelium(III) oxide.

== Physical properties ==
Californium(III) oxide forms a yellow-green solid with a melting point of 1750 °C and exists in three modifications. The body-centered cubic modification forms a crystal lattice with a = 1083.9 ± 0.4 pm. The transition temperature between body-centered cubic and monoclinic structures is about 1400 °C.

It is insoluble in water.
