= Curium hexafluoride =

Names
- IUPAC name Curium hexafluoride
- Other names Curium(VI) fluoride

Identifiers
CAS Number	105857-30-5
3D model (JSmol)	Interactive image
- InChI: InChI=1S/Cm.6FH/h;6*1H/q+6;;;;;;/p-6 Key: BWZXFPXJYOWDNR-UHFFFAOYSA-H
- SMILES: F[Cm](F)(F)(F)(F)F

Properties
Chemical formula	CmF_{6}
Molar mass	361 g·mol^{−1}

Related compounds
Related compounds	Americium hexafluoride, Einsteinium hexafluoride
- Except where otherwise noted, data are given for materials in their standard state (at 25 °C [77 °F], 100 kPa). Infobox references

Curium hexafluoride is an inorganic chemical compound of curium and fluorine with the chemical formula CmF_{6}. It is still supposed to be a hypothetical compound but claimed to be identified thermochromatographically.

== Synthesis ==
It is reported that the compound can be obtained by the reaction of BF_{3} and F_{2} with Cm at 800 °C.
