= Curium(IV) fluoride =

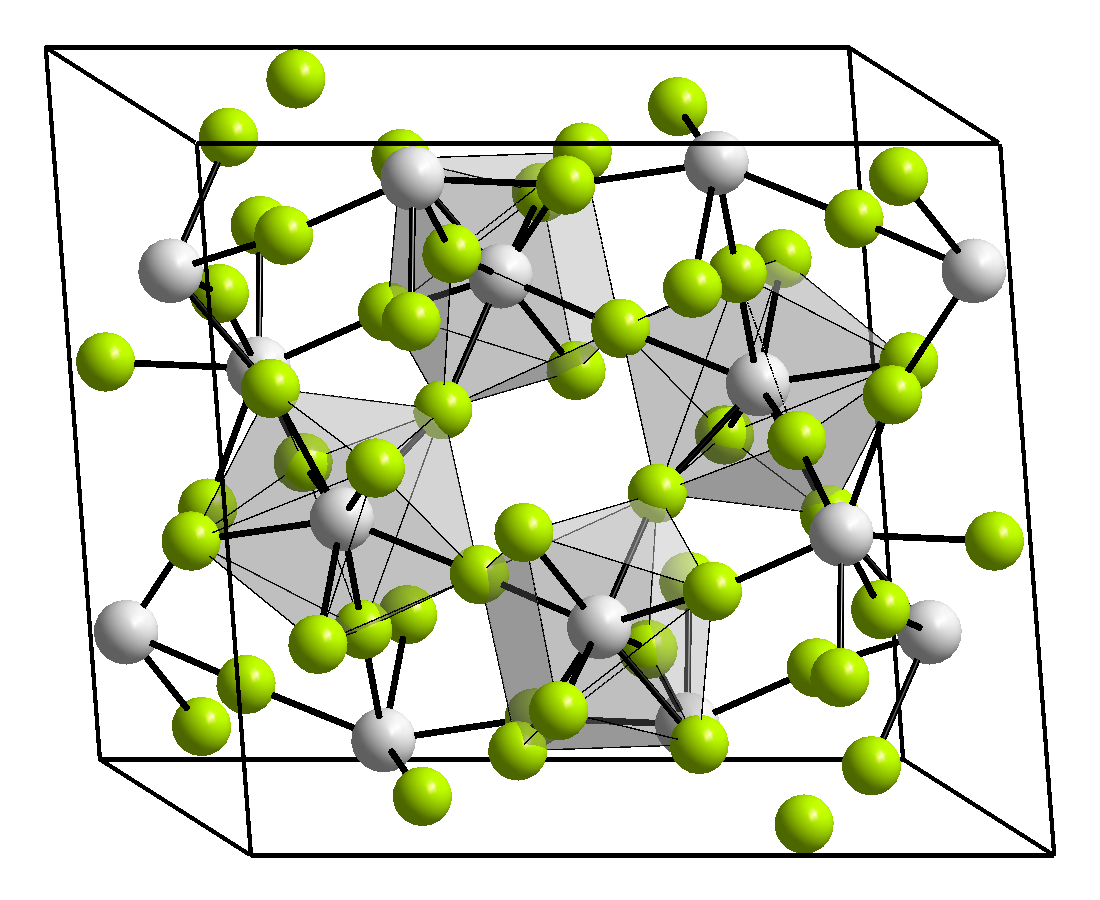

Names
- IUPAC name Curium tetrafluoride
- Other names Curium(IV) fluoride

Identifiers
CAS Number	24311-95-3
3D model (JSmol)	Interactive image
- InChI: InChI=1S/Cm.4FH/h;4*1H/q+4;;;;/p-4 Key: ZLUFUNLZMYTJKM-UHFFFAOYSA-J
- SMILES: [Cm+4].[F-].[F-].[F-].[F-]

Properties
Chemical formula	CmF_{4}
Molar mass	323 g·mol^{−1}
Appearance	brownish-tan solid

Related compounds
Related compounds	Americium tetrafluoride
- Except where otherwise noted, data are given for materials in their standard state (at 25 °C [77 °F], 100 kPa). Infobox references

Curium(IV) fluoride is an inorganic chemical compound, a salt of curium and fluorine with the chemical formula CmF_{4}.

== Synthesis ==
It is reported that the compound can be prepared by fluorination of CmF_{3} with elemental fluorine at 400°C.

2CmF_{3} + F_{2} → 2CmF_{4}

== Physical properties ==
The compound forms brownish-tan solid composed of Cm^{4+} and F^{−} ions. It has a monoclinic crystal structure of the space group C_{2/c} (No. 15), and lattice parameters a = 1250 pm, b = 1049 pm, and c = 818 pm. It has the same crystal structure as that of UF_{4}.
