= Berkelium(IV) oxide =

Names
- Other names: Berkelium dioxide

Identifiers
CAS Number	12010-84-3
3D model (JSmol)	Interactive image
ChemSpider	129557871
PubChem CID	165360219
CompTox Dashboard (EPA)	DTXSID201337109
- InChI: InChI=1S/Bk.2O/q+4;2*-2 Key: HHLDADCCGFTHIT-UHFFFAOYSA-N
- SMILES: [O-2].[O-2].[Bk+4]

Properties
Chemical formula	BkO_{2}
Molar mass	279 g·mol^{−1}
Appearance	Brown solid

Structure
Crystal structure	cubic
Space group	Fm3̅m
Lattice constant	a = 533.2 pm, b = 533.2 pm, c = 533.2 pm

Related compounds
Other anions	Berkelium(IV) sulfide
Other cations	Americium(IV) oxide Curium(IV) oxide Californium(IV) oxide
Related compounds	Berkelium(III) oxide
- Except where otherwise noted, data are given for materials in their standard state (at 25 °C [77 °F], 100 kPa). Infobox references

Berkelium(IV) oxide, also known as berkelium dioxide, is a chemical compound with the formula BkO_{2}. It can be converted to berkelium(III) oxide by hydrogen reduction at 600 °C.

2BkO_{2} + H_{2} → Bk_{2}O_{3} + H_{2}O

== Production ==
Berkelium(IV) oxide is produced by burning berkelium metal in air at 1200 °C. It can also be produced by reacting berkelium(III) oxide with oxygen at 600 °C.
