= Berkelium =

Berkelium, _{97}Bk
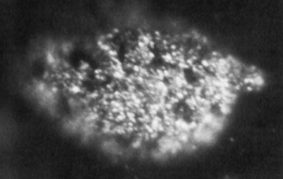

Berkelium
- Pronunciation: /bərˈkiːliəm/ (bər-KEE-lee-əm); /ˈbɜːrkliəm/ (BUR-klee-əm)
- Appearance: silvery
- Mass number: [247]

Berkelium in the periodic table
Hydrogen																															Helium
Lithium	Beryllium																									Boron	Carbon	Nitrogen	Oxygen	Fluorine	Neon
Sodium	Magnesium																									Aluminium	Silicon	Phosphorus	Sulfur	Chlorine	Argon
Potassium	Calcium															Scandium	Titanium	Vanadium	Chromium	Manganese	Iron	Cobalt	Nickel	Copper	Zinc	Gallium	Germanium	Arsenic	Selenium	Bromine	Krypton
Rubidium	Strontium															Yttrium	Zirconium	Niobium	Molybdenum	Technetium	Ruthenium	Rhodium	Palladium	Silver	Cadmium	Indium	Tin	Antimony	Tellurium	Iodine	Xenon
Caesium	Barium	Lanthanum	Cerium	Praseodymium	Neodymium	Promethium	Samarium	Europium	Gadolinium	Terbium	Dysprosium	Holmium	Erbium	Thulium	Ytterbium	Lutetium	Hafnium	Tantalum	Tungsten	Rhenium	Osmium	Iridium	Platinum	Gold	Mercury (element)	Thallium	Lead	Bismuth	Polonium	Astatine	Radon
Francium	Radium	Actinium	Thorium	Protactinium	Uranium	Neptunium	Plutonium	Americium	Curium	Berkelium	Californium	Einsteinium	Fermium	Mendelevium	Nobelium	Lawrencium	Rutherfordium	Dubnium	Seaborgium	Bohrium	Hassium	Meitnerium	Darmstadtium	Roentgenium	Copernicium	Nihonium	Flerovium	Moscovium	Livermorium	Tennessine	Oganesson
Tb
↑
Bk
↓
—
curium ← berkelium → californium
- Atomic number (Z): 97
- Group: f-block groups (no number)
- Period: period 7
- Block: f-block
- Electron configuration: [Rn] 5f^{9} 7s^{2}
- Electrons per shell: 2, 8, 18, 32, 27, 8, 2

Physical properties
- Phase at STP: solid
- Melting point: beta: 1259 K (986 °C, 1807 °F)
- Boiling point: beta: 2900 K (2627 °C, 4760 °F)
- Density (near r.t.): alpha: 14.78 g/cm^{3} beta: 13.25 g/cm^{3}
- Heat of fusion: 7.92 kJ/mol (calculated)

Atomic properties
- Oxidation states: common: +3 +2, +4, +5
- Electronegativity: Pauling scale: 1.3
- Ionization energies: 1st: 601 kJ/mol
- Atomic radius: empirical: 170 pm
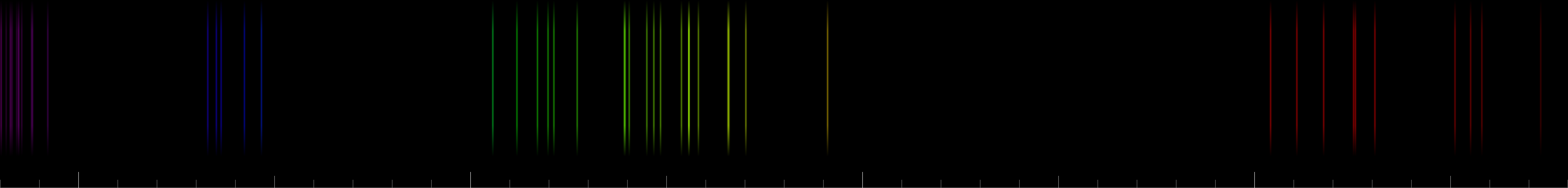
- Spectral lines of berkelium

Other properties
- Natural occurrence: synthetic
- Crystal structure: double hexagonal close-packed (dhcp)
- Thermal conductivity: 10 W/(m⋅K)
- Magnetic ordering: paramagnetic
- CAS Number: 7440-40-6

History
- Naming: after Berkeley, California, where it was discovered
- Discovery: Lawrence Berkeley National Laboratory (1949)

Isotopes of berkelium
Main isotopes			Decay	
Isotope	abundance	half-life (t_{1/2})	mode	product
^{245}Bk	synth	4.94 d	ε	^{245}Cm
^{245}Bk	synth	4.94 d	α	^{241}Am
^{246}Bk	synth	1.80 d	β^{+}	^{246}Cm
^{246}Bk	synth	1.80 d	α	^{242}Am
^{247}Bk	synth	1380 y	α	^{243}Am
^{248}Bk	synth	>9 y	α	^{244}Am
^{249}Bk	synth	327.2 d	β^{−}	^{249}Cf
^{249}Bk	synth	327.2 d	α	^{245}Am
^{249}Bk	synth	327.2 d	SF	–

Berkelium is a synthetic chemical element; it has symbol Bk and atomic number 97. It is a member of the actinide and transuranium element series. It is named after the city of Berkeley, California, the location of the Lawrence Berkeley National Laboratory (then the University of California Radiation Laboratory) where it was discovered in December 1949. Berkelium was the fifth transuranium element discovered after neptunium, plutonium, curium and americium.

The major isotope of berkelium, ^{249}Bk, is synthesized in minute quantities in dedicated high-flux nuclear reactors, mainly at the Oak Ridge National Laboratory in Tennessee, United States, and at the Research Institute of Atomic Reactors in Dimitrovgrad, Russia. The longest-lived and second-most important isotope, ^{247}Bk, can be synthesized via irradiation of ^{244}Cm with high-energy alpha particles.

Just over one gram of berkelium has been produced in the United States since 1967. There is no practical application of berkelium outside scientific research which is mostly directed at the synthesis of heavier transuranium elements and superheavy elements. A 22-milligram batch of berkelium-249 was prepared during a 250-day irradiation period and then purified for a further 90 days at Oak Ridge in 2009. This sample was used to synthesize the new element tennessine for the first time in 2009 at the Joint Institute for Nuclear Research, Russia, after it was bombarded with calcium-48 ions for 150 days. This was the culmination of the Russia–US collaboration on the synthesis of the heaviest elements on the periodic table.

Berkelium is a soft, silvery-white, radioactive metal. The berkelium-249 isotope emits low-energy beta particles and thus is relatively safe to handle. It decays with a half-life of 330 days to californium-249, which is a strong emitter of ionizing alpha particles. This gradual transmutation is an important consideration when studying the properties of elemental berkelium and its chemical compounds, since the formation of californium brings not only chemical contamination, but also free-radical effects and self-heating from the emitted alpha particles.

== Characteristics ==
=== Physical ===
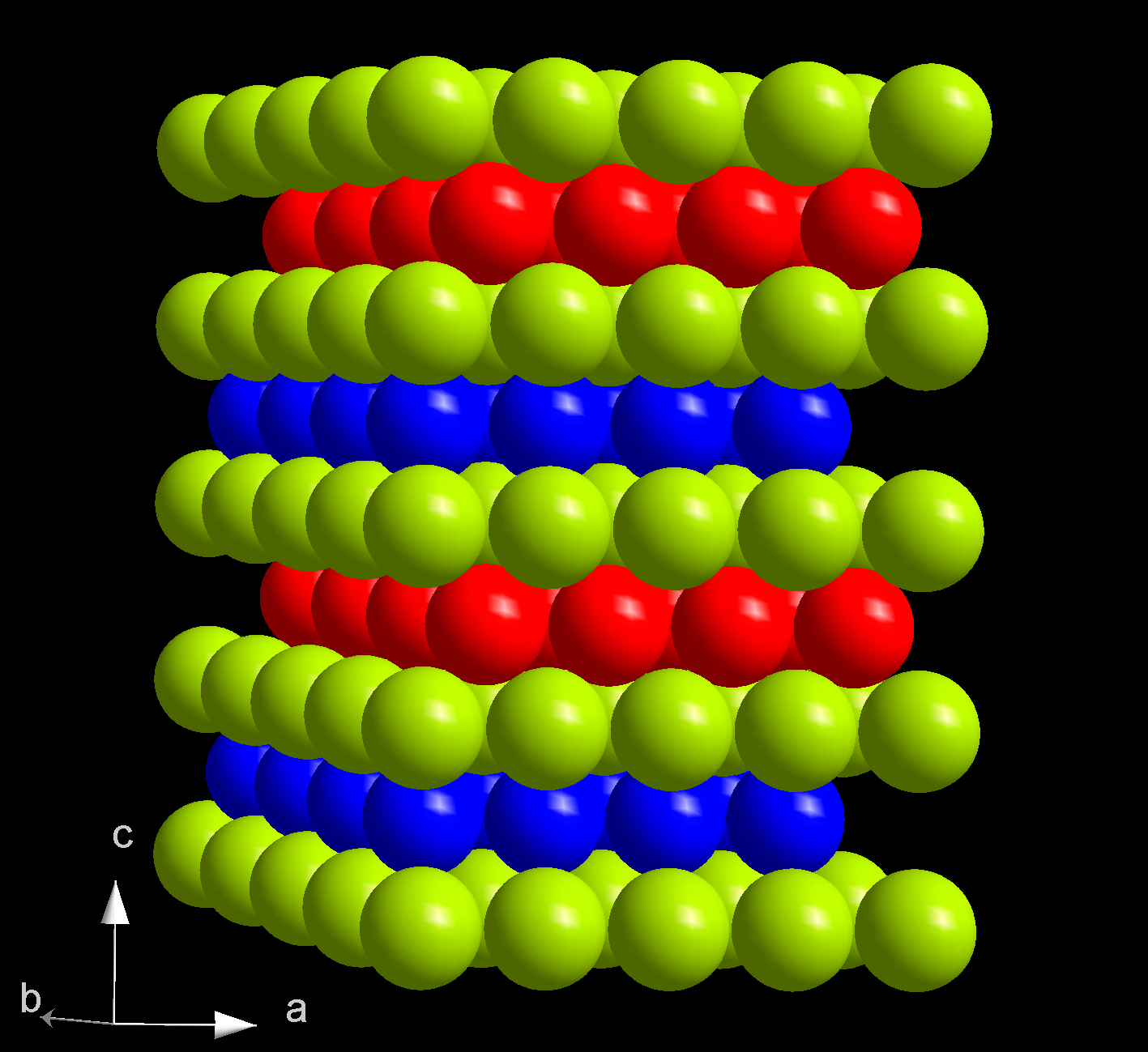
Double-hexagonal close packing with the layer sequence ABAC in the crystal structure of α-berkelium (A: green, B: blue, C: red)

Berkelium is a soft, silvery-white, radioactive actinide metal. In the periodic table, it is located to the right of the actinide curium, to the left of the actinide californium and below the lanthanide terbium with which it shares many similarities in physical and chemical properties. Its density of 14.78 g/cm^{3} lies between those of curium (13.52 g/cm^{3}) and californium (15.1 g/cm^{3}), as does its melting point of 986 °C, below that of curium (1340 °C) but higher than that of californium (900 °C). Berkelium is relatively soft and has one of the lowest bulk moduli among the actinides, at about 20 GPa (2×10^{10} Pa).

Berkelium(III) ions shows two sharp fluorescence peaks at 652 nanometers (red light) and 742 nanometers (deep red – near-infrared) due to internal transitions at the f-electron shell. The relative intensity of these peaks depends on the excitation power and temperature of the sample. This emission can be observed, for example, after dispersing berkelium ions in a silicate glass, by melting the glass in presence of berkelium oxide or halide.

Between 70 K and room temperature, berkelium behaves as a Curie–Weiss paramagnetic material with an effective magnetic moment of 9.69 Bohr magnetons (μ_{B}) and a Curie temperature of 101 K. This magnetic moment is almost equal to the theoretical value of 9.72 μ_{B} calculated within the simple atomic L-S coupling model. Upon cooling to about 34 K, berkelium undergoes a transition to an antiferromagnetic state. The enthalpy of dissolution in hydrochloric acid at standard conditions is −600 kJ/mol, from which the standard enthalpy of formation (Δ_{f}H°) of aqueous Bk^{3+} ions is obtained as −601 kJ/mol. The standard electrode potential Bk^{3+}/Bk is −2.01 V. The ionization potential of a neutral berkelium atom is 6.23 eV.

=== Allotropes ===
At ambient conditions, berkelium assumes its most stable α form which has a hexagonal symmetry, space group P6_{3}/mmc, lattice parameters of 341 pm and 1107 pm. The crystal has a double-hexagonal close packing structure with the layer sequence ABAC and so is isotypic (having a similar structure) with α-lanthanum and α-forms of actinides beyond curium. This crystal structure changes with pressure and temperature. When compressed at room temperature to 7 GPa, α-berkelium transforms to the β modification, which has a face-centered cubic (fcc) symmetry and space group Fm3̅m. This transition occurs without change in volume, but the enthalpy increases by 3.66 kJ/mol. Upon further compression to 25 GPa, berkelium transforms to an orthorhombic γ-berkelium structure similar to that of α-uranium. This transition is accompanied by a 12% volume decrease and delocalization of the electrons at the 5f electron shell. No further phase transitions are observed up to 57 GPa.

Upon heating, α-berkelium transforms into another phase with an fcc lattice (but slightly different from β-berkelium), space group Fm3̅m and the lattice constant of 500 pm; this fcc structure is equivalent to the closest packing with the sequence ABC. This phase is metastable and will gradually revert to the original α-berkelium phase at room temperature. The temperature of the phase transition is believed to be quite close to the melting point.

=== Chemical ===
Like all actinides, berkelium dissolves in various aqueous inorganic acids, liberating gaseous hydrogen and converting into the berkelium(III) state. This trivalent oxidation state (+3) is the most stable, especially in aqueous solutions, but tetravalent (+4), pentavalent (+5), and possibly divalent (+2) berkelium compounds are also known. The existence of divalent berkelium salts is uncertain and has only been reported in mixed lanthanum(III) chloride-strontium chloride melts. A similar behavior is observed for the lanthanide analogue of berkelium, terbium. Aqueous solutions of Bk^{3+} ions are green in most acids. The color of Bk^{4+} ions is yellow in hydrochloric acid and orange-yellow in sulfuric acid. Berkelium does not react rapidly with oxygen at room temperature, possibly due to the formation of a protective oxide layer surface. However, it reacts with molten metals, hydrogen, halogens, chalcogens and pnictogens to form various binary compounds.

In 2025 an organometallic compound containing berkelium was synthesized from 0.3 mg of berkelium and named berkelocene.

=== Isotopes ===
Twenty isotopes and six nuclear isomers (excited states of an isotope) of berkelium have been characterized, with mass numbers ranging from 233 to 253 (except 237). All of them are radioactive. The longest half-lives are observed for ^{247}Bk (1,380 years), ^{248}Bk (unknown, almost surely over 300 years), and ^{249}Bk (327.2 days); other isotopes are less than a week. The isotope which is the easiest to synthesize (reactor neutron capture) is berkelium-249. This emits mostly soft β-particles which are inconvenient for detection. Its alpha radiation is rather weak (1.45×10^{−3}%) with respect to the β-radiation, but is sometimes used to detect this isotope. The second important berkelium isotope, berkelium-247, is beta-stable and an alpha emitter, as are most long-lived actinide isotopes.

=== Occurrence ===
All berkelium isotopes have a half-life far too short to be primordial. Therefore, any primordial berkelium − that is, berkelium present on the Earth during its formation − has decayed by now.

On Earth, berkelium is mostly concentrated in certain areas, which were used for the atmospheric nuclear weapons tests between 1945 and 1980, as well as at the sites of nuclear incidents, such as the Chernobyl disaster, Three Mile Island accident and 1968 Thule Air Base B-52 crash. Analysis of the debris at the testing site of the first United States' first thermonuclear weapon, Ivy Mike, (1 November 1952, Enewetak Atoll), revealed high concentrations of various actinides, including berkelium. For reasons of military secrecy, this result was not published until 1956.

Nuclear reactors produce mostly, among the berkelium isotopes, berkelium-249. During the storage and before the fuel disposal, most of it beta decays to californium-249. The latter has a half-life of 351 years, which is relatively long compared to the half-lives of other isotopes produced in the reactor, and is therefore undesirable in the disposal products.

The transuranic elements up to fermium, including berkelium, should have been present in the natural nuclear fission reactor at Oklo, but any quantities produced then would have long since decayed away.

== History ==
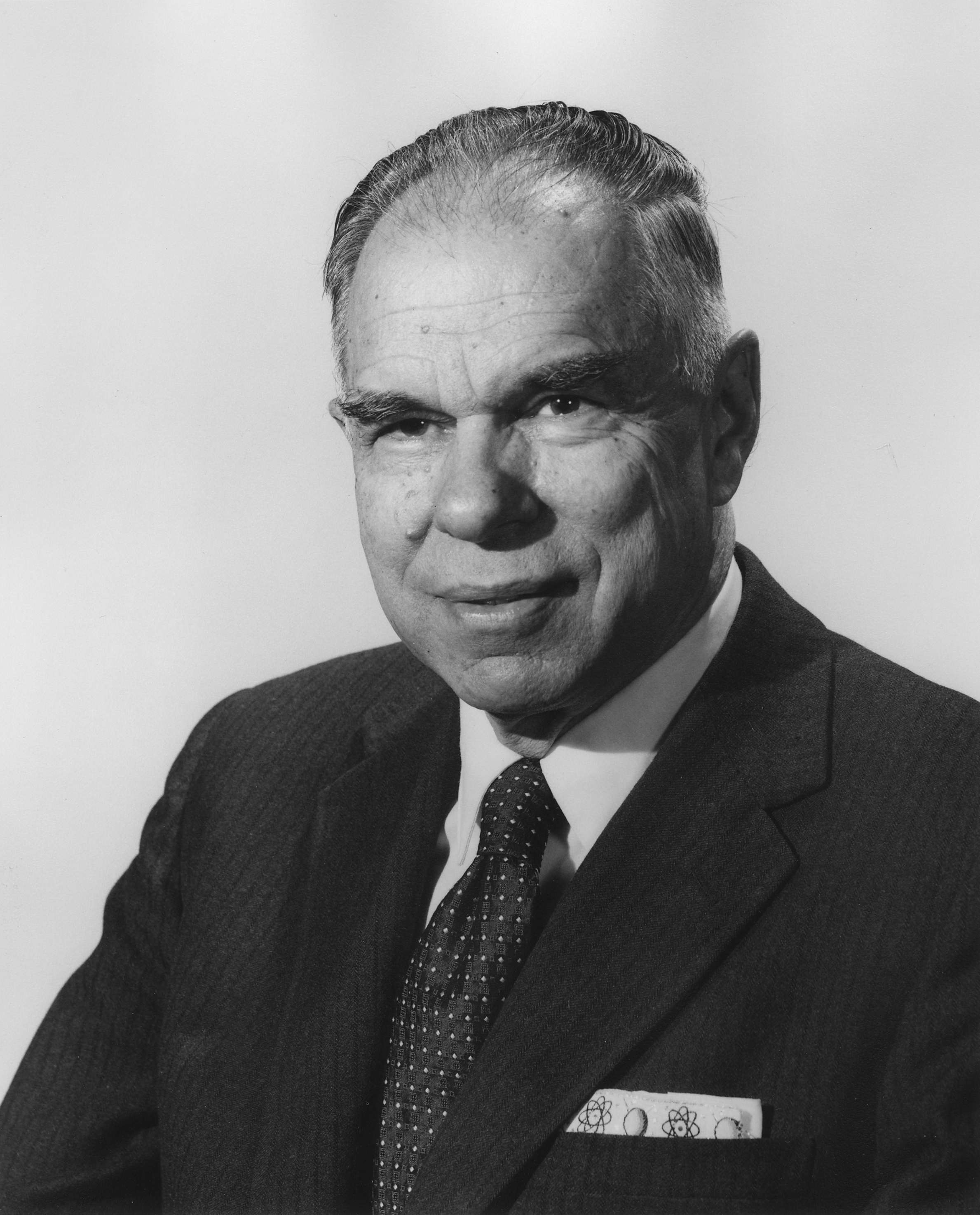
Glenn T. Seaborg

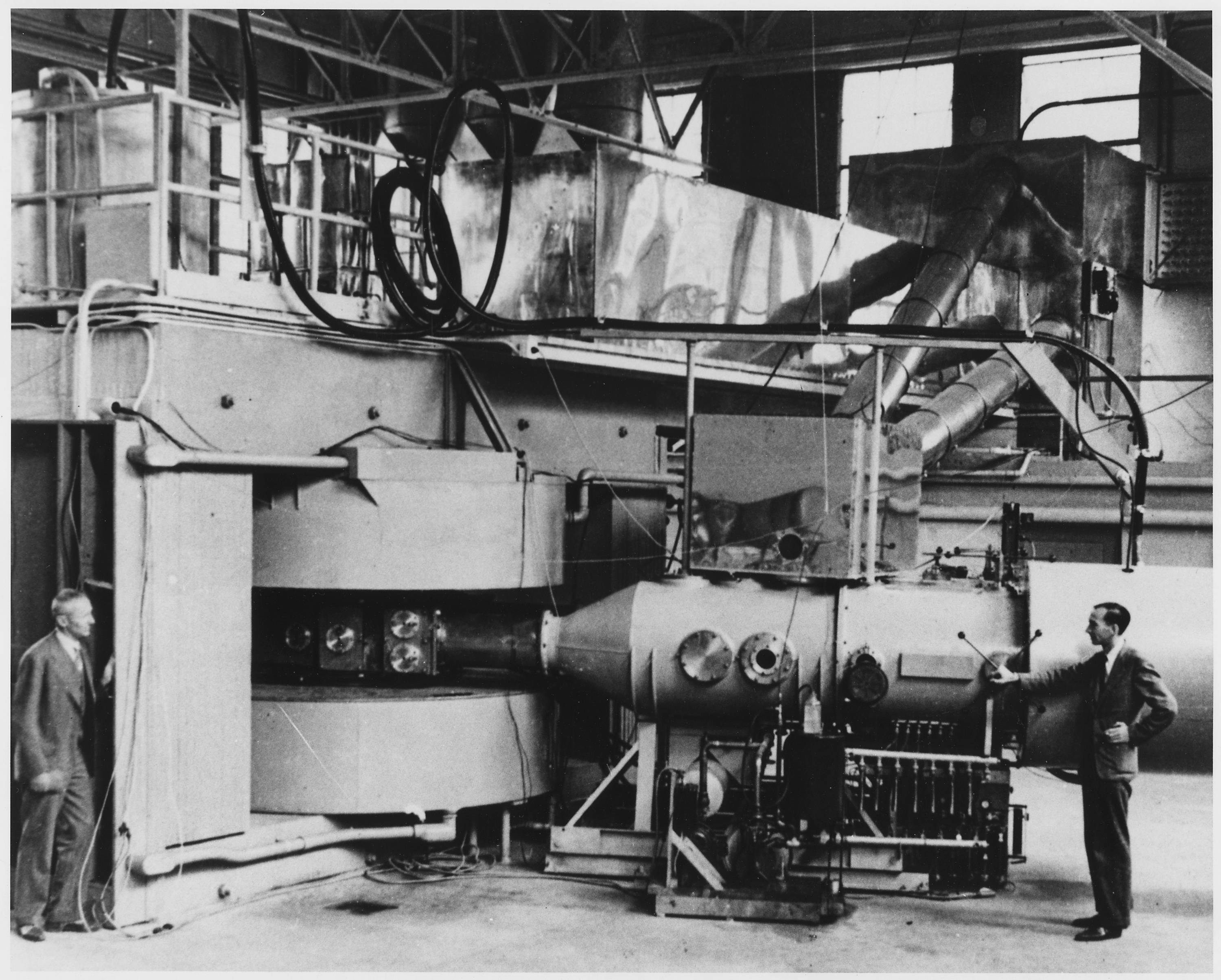
The 60-inch cyclotron at the Lawrence Radiation Laboratory, University of California, Berkeley, in August 1939

Although very small amounts of berkelium were possibly produced in previous nuclear experiments, it was first intentionally synthesized, isolated and identified in December 1949 by Glenn T. Seaborg, Albert Ghiorso, Stanley Gerald Thompson, and Kenneth Street Jr. They used the 60-inch cyclotron at the University of California, Berkeley. Similar to the nearly simultaneous discovery of americium (element 95) and curium (element 96) in 1944, the new elements berkelium and californium (element 98) were both produced in 1949–1950.

The name choice for element 97 followed the previous tradition of the Californian group to draw an analogy between the newly discovered actinide and the lanthanide element positioned above it in the periodic table. Previously, americium was named after a continent as its analogue europium, and curium honored scientists Marie and Pierre Curie as the lanthanide above it, gadolinium, was named after the explorer of the rare-earth elements Johan Gadolin. Thus, the discovery report by the Berkeley group reads: "It is suggested that element 97 be given the name berkelium (symbol Bk) after the city of Berkeley in a manner similar to that used in naming its chemical homologue terbium (atomic number 65) whose name was derived from the town of Ytterby, Sweden, where the rare earth minerals were first found." This tradition ended with berkelium, though, as the naming of the next discovered actinide, californium, was not related to its lanthanide analogue dysprosium, but after the discovery place.

The most difficult steps in synthesising berkelium were its separation from the final products and the production of sufficient quantities of americium for the target material. First, americium (^{241}Am) nitrate solution was coated on a platinum foil, the solution was evaporated and the residue converted by annealing to americium dioxide (AmO_{2}). This target was irradiated with 35 MeV alpha particles for 6 hours in the 60-inch cyclotron at the Lawrence Radiation Laboratory, University of California, Berkeley. The (α,2n) reaction induced by the irradiation yielded the ^{243}Bk isotope and two free neutrons:

^{241}_{95}Am + ^{4}_{2}He → ^{243}_{97}Bk + 2 ^{1}_{0}n

After the irradiation, the coating was dissolved with nitric acid and then precipitated as the hydroxide using concentrated aqueous ammonia solution. The product was centrifugated and re-dissolved in nitric acid. To separate berkelium from the unreacted americium, this solution was added to a mixture of aqueous ammonia and ammonium sulfate and heated in the presence of atmospheric oxygen to convert all the dissolved americium into the oxidation state +6. Unoxidized residual americium was precipitated by the addition of hydrofluoric acid as americium(III) fluoride (AmF_{3}). This step yielded a mixture of the accompanying product curium and the expected element 97 in form of trifluorides. The mixture was converted to the corresponding hydroxides by treating it with potassium hydroxide, and after centrifugation, was dissolved in perchloric acid.

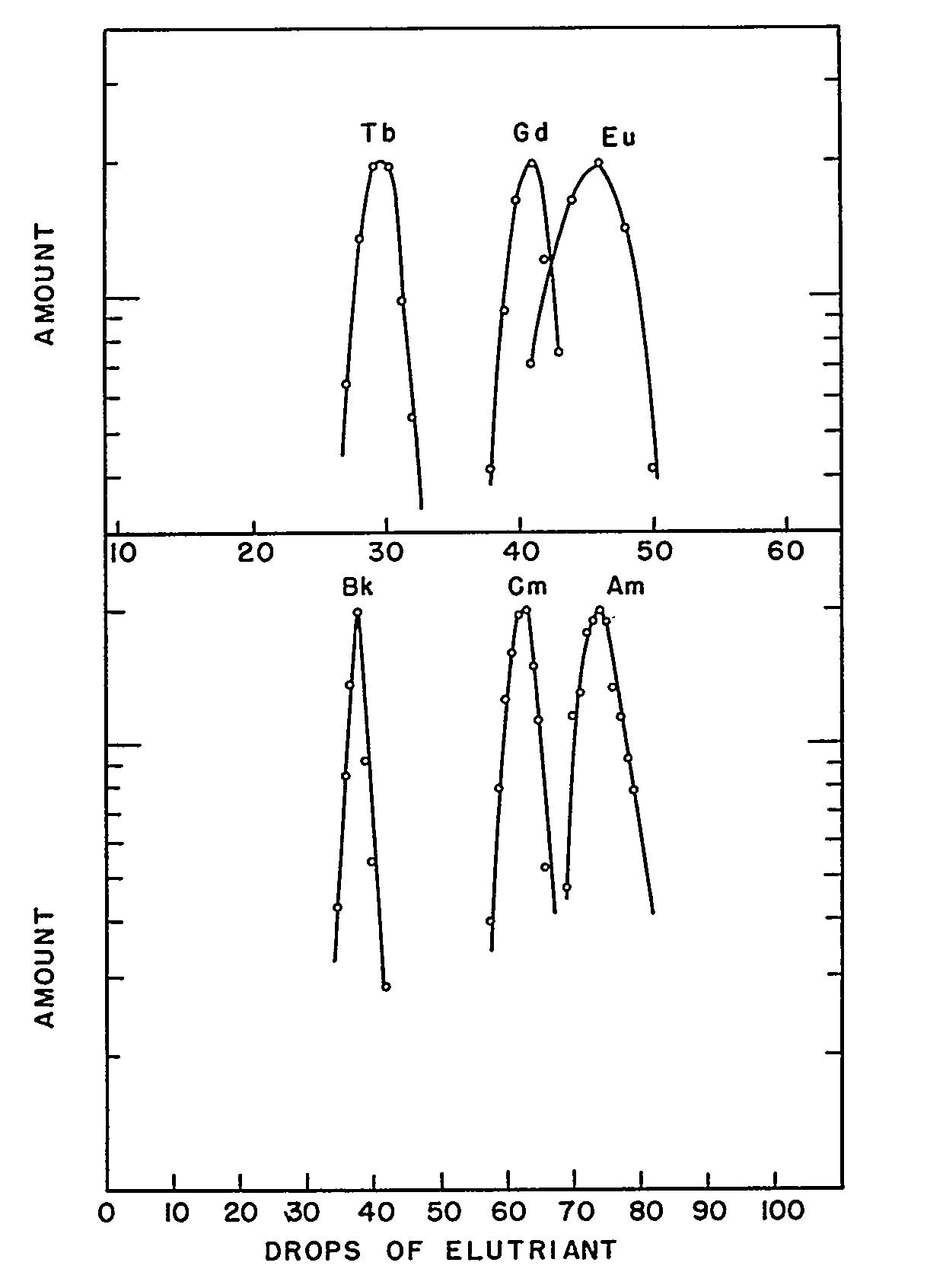
Chromatographic elution curves revealing the similarity between the lanthanides terbium (Tb), gadolinium (Gd), and europium (Eu) (top graph) and their corresponding actinides berkelium (Bk), curium (Cm), and americium (Am) (bottom graph)

Further separation was carried out in the presence of a citric acid/ammonium buffer solution in a weakly acidic medium (pH ≈ 3.5), using ion exchange at elevated temperature. The chromatographic separation behavior was unknown for element 97 at the time but was anticipated by analogy with terbium. The first results were disappointing because no alpha-particle emission signature could be detected from the elution product. With further analysis, searching for characteristic X-rays and conversion electron signals, a berkelium isotope was eventually detected. Its mass number was uncertain between 243 and 244 in the initial report, but was later established as 243.

== Synthesis and extraction ==
=== Preparation of isotopes ===
Berkelium is produced by bombarding lighter actinides uranium (^{238}U) or plutonium (^{239}Pu) with neutrons in a nuclear reactor. In a more common case of uranium fuel, plutonium is produced first by neutron capture (the so-called (n,γ) reaction or neutron fusion) followed by beta-decay:

$\ce{^{238}_{92}U ->[\ce{(n,\gamma)}] ^{239}_{92}U ->[\beta^-][23.5 \ \ce{min}] ^{239}_{93}Np ->[\beta^-][2.3565 \ \ce{d}] ^{239}_{94}Pu}$ (The times are half-lives.)

Plutonium-239 is further irradiated by a source that has a high neutron flux, several times higher than a conventional nuclear reactor, such as the 85-megawatt High Flux Isotope Reactor (HFIR) at the Oak Ridge National Laboratory in Tennessee, US. The higher flux promotes fusion reactions involving not one but several neutrons, converting ^{239}Pu to ^{244}Cm and then to ^{249}Cm:

$$\begin{align}
\ce{^{239}_{94}Pu ->[\ce{4(n,\gamma)}] ^{243}_{94}Pu ->[\beta^-][4.956 \ \ce{h}] ^{243}_{95}Am ->[\ce{(n,\gamma)}] ^{244}_{95}Am ->[\beta^-][10.1 \ \ce{h}]} & \ce{^{244}_{96}Cm}\\
& \ce{^{244}_{96}Cm ->[\ce{5(n,\gamma)}] ^{249}_{96}Cm}
\end{align}$$

Curium-249 has a short half-life of 64 minutes, and thus its further conversion to ^{250}Cm has a low probability. Instead, it transforms by beta-decay into ^{249}Bk:

$$\ce{^{249}_{96}Cm ->[{\beta^-}][64.15 \ \ce{min}] ^{249}_{97}Bk ->[\beta^-][330 \ \ce{d}] ^{249}_{98}Cf}$$

The thus-produced ^{249}Bk has a long half-life of 330 days and thus can capture another neutron. However, the product, ^{250}Bk, again has a relatively short half-life of 3.212 hours and thus does not yield any heavier berkelium isotopes. It instead decays to the californium isotope ^{250}Cf:

$$\ce{^{249}_{97}Bk ->[\ce{(n,\gamma)}] ^{250}_{97}Bk ->[\beta^-][3.212 \ \ce{h}] ^{250}_{98}Cf}$$

Although ^{247}Bk is the most stable isotope of berkelium, its production in nuclear reactors is very difficult because its potential progenitor ^{247}Cm has never been observed to undergo beta decay. Thus, ^{249}Bk is the most accessible isotope of berkelium, which still is available only in small quantities (only 0.66 grams have been produced in the US over the period 1967–1983) at a high price of the order 185 USD per microgram. It is the only berkelium isotope available in bulk quantities, and thus the only berkelium isotope whose properties can be extensively studied.

The isotope ^{248}Bk was first obtained in 1956 by bombarding a mixture of curium isotopes with 25 MeV α-particles. Although its direct detection was hindered by strong signal interference with ^{245}Bk, the existence of a new isotope was proven by the growth of the decay product ^{248}Cf which had been previously characterized. The half-life of ^{248}Bk was estimated as 23±5 hours, though later 1965 work gave a half-life in excess of 300 years (which may be due to an isomeric state). Berkelium-247 was produced during the same year by irradiating ^{244}Cm with alpha-particles:

$$\begin{cases}
\ce{^{244}_{96}Cm ->[\ce{(\alpha,n)}] ^{247}_{98}Cf ->[\epsilon][3.11 \ \ce{h}] ^{247}_{97}Bk}\\
\ce{^{244}_{96}Cm ->[\ce{(\alpha,p)}] ^{247}_{97}Bk}
\end{cases}$$

Berkelium-242 was synthesized in 1979 by bombarding ^{235}U with ^{11}B, ^{238}U with ^{10}B, ^{232}Th with ^{14}N or ^{232}Th with ^{15}N. It converts by electron capture to ^{242}Cm with a half-life of 7.0±1.3 minutes. A search for an initially suspected isotope ^{241}Bk was then unsuccessful; ^{241}Bk has since been synthesized.

$$\begin{cases}
\ce{^{235}_{92}U + ^{11}_{5}B -> ^{242}_{97}Bk + 4^{1}_{0}n} & \ce{^{232}_{90}Th + ^{14}_{7}N -> ^{242}_{97}Bk + 4^{1}_{0}n}\\
\ce{^{238}_{92}U + ^{10}_{5}B -> ^{242}_{97}Bk + 6^{1}_{0}n} & \ce{^{232}_{90}Th + ^{15}_{7}N -> ^{242}_{97}Bk + 5^{1}_{0}n}
\end{cases}$$

=== Separation ===
The fact that berkelium readily assumes oxidation state +4 in solids, and is relatively stable in this state in liquids, greatly assists separation of berkelium from many other actinides. These are produced in relatively large amounts during the nuclear synthesis and often favor the +3 state. This fact was not yet known in the initial experiments, which used a more complex separation procedure. Various inorganic oxidation agents can be applied to the berkelium(III) solution to convert it to the +4 state, such as bromates (BrO^{−}_{3}), bismuthates (BiO^{−}_{3}), chromates (CrO^{2−}_{4} and Cr_{2}O^{2−}_{7}), silver(I) thiolate (Ag_{2}S_{2}O_{8}), lead(IV) oxide (PbO_{2}), ozone (O_{3}), or photochemical oxidation procedures. More recently, it has been discovered that some organic and bio-inspired molecules, such as the chelator 3,4,3-LI(1,2-HOPO), can also oxidize Bk(III) and stabilize Bk(IV) under mild conditions. Berkelium(IV) is then extracted with ion exchange, extraction chromatography or liquid-liquid extraction using HDEHP (bis-(2-ethylhexyl) phosphoric acid), amines, tributyl phosphate or various other reagents. These procedures separate berkelium from most trivalent actinides and lanthanides, except for the lanthanide cerium (lanthanides are absent in the irradiation target but are created in various nuclear fission decay chains).

A more detailed procedure adopted at the Oak Ridge National Laboratory was as follows: the initial mixture of actinides is processed with ion exchange using lithium chloride reagent, then precipitated as hydroxides, filtered and dissolved in nitric acid. It is then treated with high-pressure elution from cation exchange resins, and the berkelium phase is oxidized and extracted using one of the procedures described above. Reduction of the thus-obtained berkelium(IV) to the +3 oxidation state yields a solution, which is nearly free from other actinides (but contains cerium). Berkelium and cerium are then separated with another round of ion-exchange treatment.

=== Bulk metal preparation ===
In order to characterize chemical and physical properties of solid berkelium and its compounds, a program was initiated in 1952 at the Material Testing Reactor, Arco, Idaho, US. It resulted in preparation of an eight-gram plutonium-239 target and in the first production of macroscopic quantities (0.6 micrograms) of berkelium by Burris B. Cunningham and Stanley Gerald Thompson in 1958, after a continuous reactor irradiation of this target for six years. This irradiation method was and still is the only way of producing weighable amounts of the element, and most solid-state studies of berkelium have been conducted on microgram or submicrogram-sized samples.

The world's major irradiation sources are the 85-megawatt High Flux Isotope Reactor at the Oak Ridge National Laboratory in Tennessee, USA, and the SM-2 loop reactor at the Research Institute of Atomic Reactors (NIIAR) in Dimitrovgrad, Russia, which are both dedicated to the production of transcurium elements (atomic number greater than 96). These facilities have similar power and flux levels, and are expected to have comparable production capacities for transcurium elements, although the quantities produced at NIIAR are not publicly reported. In a "typical processing campaign" at Oak Ridge, tens of grams of curium are irradiated to produce decigram quantities of californium, milligram quantities of berkelium-249 and einsteinium, and picogram quantities of fermium. In total, just over one gram of berkelium-249 has been produced at Oak Ridge since 1967.

The first berkelium metal sample weighing 1.7 micrograms was prepared in 1971 by the reduction of berkelium(III) fluoride with lithium vapor at 1000 °C; the fluoride was suspended on a tungsten wire above a tantalum crucible containing molten lithium. Later, metal samples weighing up to 0.5 milligrams were obtained with this method.

BkF_{3} + 3 Li → Bk + 3 LiF

Similar results are obtained with berkelium(IV) fluoride. Berkelium metal can also be produced by the reduction of berkelium(IV) oxide with thorium or lanthanum.

== Compounds ==
=== Oxides ===
Two oxides of berkelium are known, with the berkelium oxidation state of +3 (Bk_{2}O_{3}) and +4 (BkO_{2}). Berkelium(IV) oxide is a brown solid, while berkelium(III) oxide is a yellow-green solid with a melting point of 1920 °C and is formed from BkO_{2} by reduction with molecular hydrogen:

2 BkO_{2} + H_{2} → Bk_{2}O_{3} + H_{2}O

Upon heating to 1200 °C, the oxide Bk_{2}O_{3} undergoes a phase change; it undergoes another phase change at 1750 °C. Such three-phase behavior is typical for the actinide sesquioxides. Berkelium(II) oxide, BkO, has been reported as a brittle gray solid but its exact chemical composition remains uncertain.

=== Halides ===
In halides, berkelium assumes the oxidation states +3 and +4. The +3 state is the most stable, especially in solutions, while the tetravalent halides BkF_{4} and Cs_{2}BkCl_{6} are only known in the solid phase. The coordination of berkelium atom in its trivalent fluoride and chloride is tricapped trigonal prismatic, with the coordination number of 9. In trivalent bromide, it is bicapped trigonal prismatic (coordination 8) or octahedral (coordination 6), and in the iodide it is octahedral.

Oxidation number	F	Cl	Br	I
+4	BkF_{4} (yellow)	Cs_{2}BkCl_{6} (orange)		
+3	BkF_{3} (yellow)	BkCl_{3} (green); Cs_{2}NaBkCl_{6}	BkBr_{3} (yellow-green)	BkI_{3} (yellow)

Berkelium(IV) fluoride (BkF_{4}) is a yellow-green ionic solid and is isotypic with uranium tetrafluoride or zirconium tetrafluoride. Berkelium(III) fluoride (BkF_{3}) is also a yellow-green solid, but it has two crystalline structures. The most stable phase at low temperatures is isotypic with yttrium(III) fluoride, while upon heating to between 350 and 600 °C, it transforms to the structure found in lanthanum trifluoride.

Visible amounts of berkelium(III) chloride (BkCl_{3}) were first isolated and characterized in 1962, and weighed only 3 billionths of a gram. It can be prepared by introducing hydrogen chloride vapors into an evacuated quartz tube containing berkelium oxide at a temperature about 500 °C. This green solid has a melting point of 600 °C, and is isotypic with uranium(III) chloride. Upon heating to nearly melting point, BkCl_{3} converts into an orthorhombic phase.

Two forms of berkelium(III) bromide are known: one with berkelium having coordination 6, and one with coordination 8. The latter is less stable and transforms to the former phase upon heating to about 350 °C. An important property of radioactive solids has been studied on these two crystal forms: the structure of fresh and aged ^{249}BkBr_{3} samples was probed by X-ray diffraction over a period longer than 3 years, so that various fractions of berkelium-249 had beta decayed to californium-249. No change in structure was observed upon the ^{249}BkBr_{3}—^{249}CfBr_{3} transformation. However, other differences were noted for ^{249}BkBr_{3} and ^{249}CfBr_{3}. For example, the latter could be reduced with hydrogen to ^{249}CfBr_{2}, but the former could not – this result was reproduced on individual ^{249}BkBr_{3} and ^{249}CfBr_{3} samples, as well on the samples containing both bromides. The intergrowth of californium in berkelium occurs at a rate of 0.22% per day and is an obstacle to studying berkelium properties. Beside a chemical contamination, ^{249}Cf, being an alpha emitter, brings undesirable self-damage of the crystal lattice and the resulting self-heating. The chemical effect however can be avoided by performing measurements as a function of time and extrapolating the obtained results.

=== Other inorganic compounds ===
The pnictides of berkelium-249 of the type BkX are known for the elements nitrogen, phosphorus, arsenic and antimony. They crystallize in the rock-salt structure and are prepared by the reaction of either berkelium(III) hydride (BkH_{3}) or metallic berkelium with these elements at elevated temperature (about 600 °C) under high vacuum.

Berkelium(III) sulfide, Bk_{2}S_{3}, is prepared by either treating berkelium oxide with a mixture of hydrogen sulfide and carbon disulfide vapors at 1130 °C, or by directly reacting metallic berkelium with elemental sulfur. These procedures yield brownish-black crystals.

Berkelium(III) and berkelium(IV) hydroxides are both stable in 1 molar solutions of sodium hydroxide. Berkelium(III) phosphate (BkPO_{4}) has been prepared as a solid, which shows strong fluorescence under excitation with a green light. Berkelium hydrides are produced by reacting metal with hydrogen gas at temperatures about 250 °C. They are non-stoichiometric with the nominal formula BkH_{2+x} (0 < x < 1). Several other salts of berkelium are known, including an oxysulfide (Bk_{2}O_{2}S), and hydrated nitrate (Bk(NO_{3})_{3}·4H_{2}O), chloride (BkCl_{3}·6H_{2}O), sulfate (Bk_{2}(SO_{4})_{3}·12H_{2}O) and oxalate (Bk_{2}(C_{2}O_{4})_{3}·4H_{2}O). Thermal decomposition at about 600 °C in an argon atmosphere (to avoid oxidation to BkO_{2}) of Bk_{2}(SO_{4})_{3}·12H_{2}O yields the crystals of berkelium(III) oxysulfate (Bk_{2}O_{2}SO_{4}). This compound is thermally stable to at least 1000 °C in inert atmosphere.

=== Organoberkelium compounds ===
Berkelium forms a trigonal (η^{5}–C_{5}H_{5})_{3}Bk metallocene complex with three cyclopentadienyl rings, which can be synthesized by reacting berkelium(III) chloride with the molten beryllocene (Be(C_{5}H_{5})_{2}) at about 70 °C. It has an amber color and a density of 2.47 g/cm^{3}. The complex is stable to heating to at least 250 °C, and sublimates without melting at about 350 °C. The high radioactivity of berkelium gradually destroys the compound (within a period of weeks). One cyclopentadienyl ring in (η^{5}–C_{5}H_{5})_{3}Bk can be substituted by chlorine to yield [Bk(C_{5}H_{5})_{2}Cl]_{2}. The optical absorption spectra of this compound are very similar to those of (η^{5}–C_{5}H_{5})_{3}Bk.

Berkelium also forms berkelocene, an actinocene complex, with substituted cyclooctatetraenides.

== Applications ==
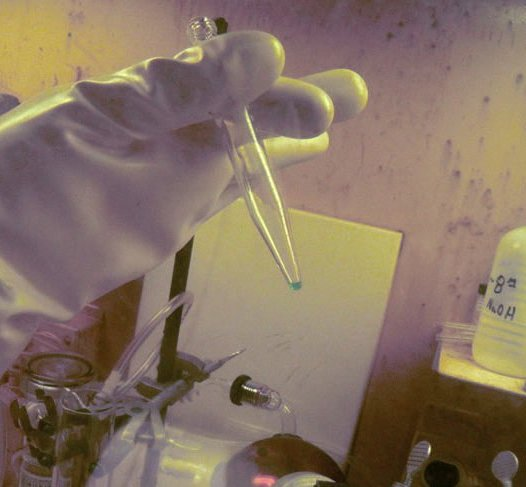
22 milligrams of berkelium (as nitrate) prepared at HFIR in 2009 at a cost of approximately one million dollars, used for the synthesis of tennessine in JINR

There is currently no use for any isotope of berkelium outside basic scientific research. Berkelium-249 is a common target nuclide to prepare still heavier transuranium elements and superheavy elements, such as lawrencium, rutherfordium and bohrium. It is also useful as a source of the isotope californium-249, which is used for studies on the chemistry of californium in preference to the more radioactive californium-252 that is produced in neutron bombardment facilities such as the HFIR.

A 22 milligram batch of berkelium-249 was prepared in a 250-day irradiation and then purified for 90 days at Oak Ridge in 2009. This target yielded the first 6 atoms of tennessine at the Joint Institute for Nuclear Research (JINR), Dubna, Russia, after bombarding it with calcium ions in the U400 cyclotron for 150 days. This synthesis was a culmination of the Russia-US collaboration between JINR and Lawrence Livermore National Laboratory on the synthesis of elements 113 to 118 which was initiated in 1989.

== Nuclear fuel cycle ==
The nuclear fission properties of berkelium are different from those of the neighboring actinides curium and californium, and they suggest berkelium to perform poorly as a fuel in a nuclear reactor. Specifically, berkelium-249 has a moderately large neutron capture cross section of 710 barns for thermal neutrons, 1200 barns resonance integral, but very low fission cross section for thermal neutrons. In a thermal reactor, much of it will therefore be converted to berkelium-250 which quickly decays to californium-250. In principle, berkelium-249 can sustain a nuclear chain reaction in a fast breeder reactor. Its critical mass is relatively high at 192 kg, which can be reduced with a water or steel reflector but would still exceed the world production of this isotope.

Berkelium-247 can maintain a chain reaction both in a thermal-neutron and in a fast-neutron reactor, however, its production is rather complex and thus the availability is much lower than its critical mass, which is about 75.7 kg for a bare sphere, 41.2 kg with a water reflector and 35.2 kg with a steel reflector (30 cm thickness).

== Health issues ==
Little is known about the effects of berkelium on human body, and analogies with other elements may not be drawn because of different radiation products (electrons for berkelium and alpha particles, neutrons, or both for most other actinides). The low energy of electrons emitted from berkelium-249 (less than 126 keV) hinders its detection, due to signal interference with other decay processes, but also makes this isotope relatively harmless to humans as compared to other actinides. However, berkelium-249 transforms with a half-life of only 330 days to the strong alpha-emitter californium-249, which is rather dangerous and has to be handled in a glovebox in a dedicated laboratory. Berkelium might promote cancer, and in the skeleton, its radiation can damage red blood cells. The maximum permissible amount of berkelium-249 in the human skeleton is 0.4 nanograms.

== Bibliography ==
- Greenwood, Norman N.; Earnshaw, Alan (1997). Chemistry of the Elements (2nd ed.). Oxford: Butterworth-Heinemann. ISBN 978-0-08-037941-8.
- Holleman, Arnold F.; Wiberg, Nils (2007). Textbook of Inorganic Chemistry (102nd ed.). Berlin: de Gruyter. ISBN 978-3-11-017770-1.
- Peterson, J. R.; Hobart, D. E. (1984). "The Chemistry of Berkelium". In Emeléus, Harry Julius (ed.). Advances in inorganic chemistry and radiochemistry. Vol. 28. Academic Press. pp. 29–64. doi:10.1016/S0898-8838(08)60204-4. ISBN 978-0-12-023628-2.
