= Uranium tetrafluoride =

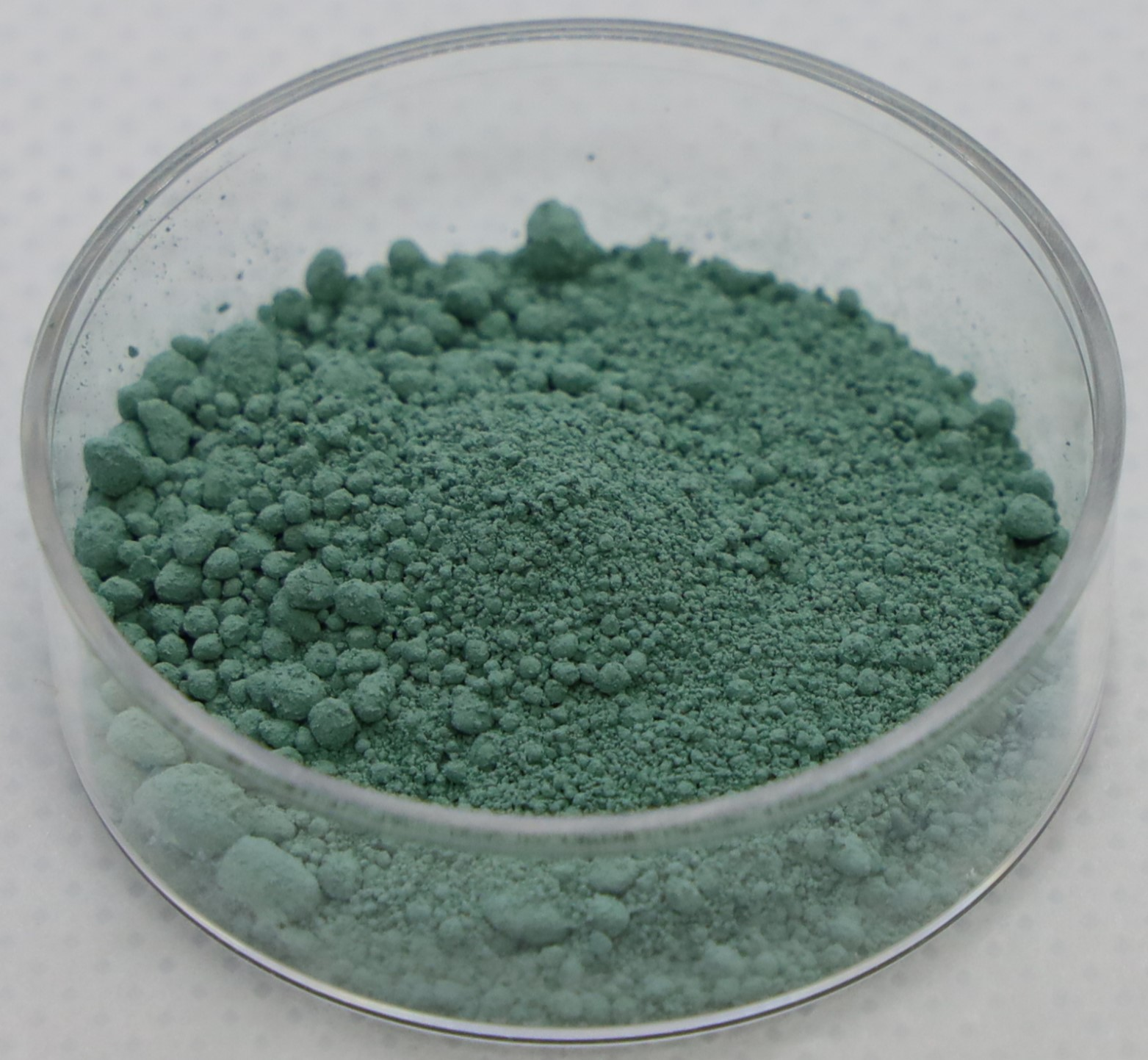

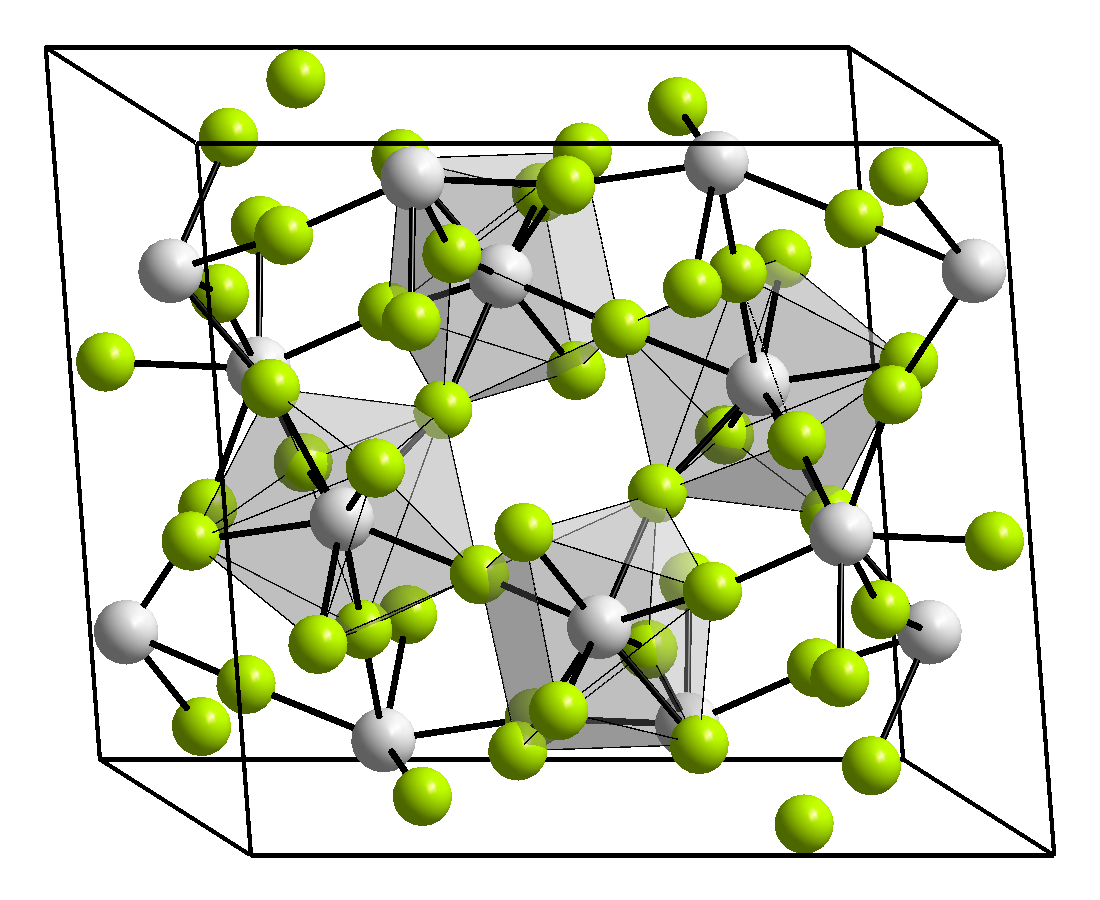

Names
- IUPAC names Uranium(IV) fluoride Uranium tetrafluoride

Identifiers
CAS Number	10049-14-6
3D model (JSmol)	Interactive image
ChemSpider	14676181
ECHA InfoCard	100.030.142
EC Number	233-170-1
PubChem CID	61461
UNII	PJ46VTD8B2
CompTox Dashboard (EPA)	DTXSID30892258
- InChI: InChI=1S/4FH.2U/h4*1H;;/q;;;;2*+2/p-4 Key: CWWZGQYYTNZESQ-UHFFFAOYSA-J; InChI=1/4FH.2U/h4*1H;;/q;;;;2*+2/p-4 Key: CWWZGQYYTNZESQ-XBHQNQODAW
- SMILES: F[U](F)(F)F

Properties
Chemical formula	UF_{4}
Molar mass	314.02 g/mol
Appearance	Green crystalline solid
Density	6.70 g/cm^{3}, solid
Melting point	1,036 °C (1,897 °F; 1,309 K)
Boiling point	1,417 °C (2,583 °F; 1,690 K)
Solubility in water	Insoluble

Structure
Crystal structure	Monoclinic, mS60
Space group	C2/c, No. 15

Hazards
- GHS labelling
Pictograms	(GHS06: Toxic) (GHS08: Health hazard) (GHS09: Environmental hazard)
Signal word	Danger
Hazard statements	H300, H330, H373, H411
Flash point	Non-flammable
Safety data sheet (SDS)	External MSDS

Related compounds
Other anions	Uranium(IV) chloride Uranium(IV) bromide Uranium(IV) iodide Uranium dioxide
Other cations	Praseodymium(IV) fluoride Thorium(IV) fluoride Protactinium(IV) fluoride Neptunium(IV) fluoride Plutonium(IV) fluoride
Related compounds	Uranium hexafluoride
- Except where otherwise noted, data are given for materials in their standard state (at 25 °C [77 °F], 100 kPa). verify (what is ?) Infobox references

Uranium tetrafluoride is the inorganic compound with the formula UF_{4}. It is a green solid with an insignificant vapor pressure and low solubility in water. Uranium in its tetravalent (uranous) state is important in various technological processes. In the uranium refining industry it is known as green salt.

== Production ==
UF_{4} is prepared from UO_{2} in a fluidized bed by reaction with hydrogen fluoride. The UO_{2} is derived from mining operations. Around 60,000 tonnes are prepared in this way annually. A common impurity is UO_{2}F_{2}. UF_{4} is susceptible to hydrolysis as well.

UF_{4} is formed by the reaction of UF_{6} with hydrogen gas in a vertical tube-type reactor. The bulk density of UF_{4} varies from about 2.0 g/cm^{3} to about 4.5 g/cm^{3} depending on the production process and the properties of the starting uranium compounds.

A molten salt reactor design, a type of nuclear reactor where the working fluid is a molten salt, would use UF_{4} as the core material. UF_{4} is generally chosen over related compounds because of the usefulness of the elements without isotope separation, better neutron economy and moderating efficiency, lower vapor pressure and better chemical stability.

== Reactions ==
Uranium tetrafluoride reacts stepwise with fluorine, first to give uranium pentafluoride and then volatile UF_{6}:

2 UF_{4} + F_{2} → 2 UF_{5}
2 UF_{5} + F_{2} → 2 UF_{6}

UF_{4} is reduced by magnesium to give the metal:

UF_{4} + 2 Mg → U + 2 MgF_{2}

UF_{4} reacts slowly with moisture at ambient temperature, forming UO_{2} and HF.

== Structure ==
Like most binary metal fluorides, UF_{4} is a dense highly crosslinked inorganic polymer. As established by X-ray crystallography, the U centres are eight-coordinate with square antiprismatic coordination spheres. The fluoride centres are doubly bridging.

== Safety ==
Like all uranium salts, UF_{4} is toxic and thus harmful by inhalation, ingestion, and through skin contact.

== See also ==
- Praseodymium(IV) fluoride which has the same crystal structure

== References of historical interest ==
- Booth, H. S.; Krasny-Ergen, W.; Heath, R. E. (1946). "Uranium Tetrafluoride". Journal of the American Chemical Society. 68 (10): 1969. Bibcode:1946JAChS..68.1969B. doi:10.1021/ja01214a028.
