= Einsteinium compounds =

Chemical compounds

Einsteinium compounds are compounds that contain the element einsteinium (Es). These compounds largely have einsteinium in the +3 oxidation state, or in some cases in the +2 and +4 oxidation states. Although einsteinium is relatively stable, with half-lives ranging from 20 days upwards, these compounds have not been studied in great detail.

== Properties of einsteinium compounds ==
Crystal structure and lattice constants of some Es compounds
Compound	Color	Symmetry	Space group	No	Pearson symbol	Lattice constants (pm)		
Compound	Color	Symmetry	Space group	No	Pearson symbol	a	b	c
Es_{2}O_{3}	Colorless	Cubic	Ia3̅	206	cI80	1076.6		
Es_{2}O_{3}	Colorless	Monoclinic	C2/m	12	mS30	1411	359	880
Es_{2}O_{3}	Colorless	Hexagonal	P3̅m1	164	hP5	370		600
EsF_{3}		Hexagonal						
EsF_{4}		Monoclinic	C2/c	15	mS60			
EsCl_{3}	Orange	Hexagonal	C6_{3}/m		hP8	727		410
EsBr_{3}	Yellow	Monoclinic	C2/m	12	mS16	727	1259	681
EsI_{3}	Amber	Hexagonal	R3̅	148	hR24	753		2084
EsOCl		Tetragonal	P4/nmm			394.8		670.2

== Oxides ==
Einsteinium(III) oxide (Es_{2}O_{3}) was obtained by burning einsteinium(III) nitrate. It forms colorless cubic crystals, which were first characterized from microgram samples sized about 30 nanometers. Two other phases, monoclinic and hexagonal, are known for this oxide. The formation of a certain Es_{2}O_{3} phase depends on the preparation technique and sample history, and there is no clear phase diagram. Interconversions between the three phases can occur spontaneously, as a result of self-irradiation or self-heating. The hexagonal phase is isotypic with lanthanum oxide where the Es^{3+} ion is surrounded by a 6-coordinated group of O^{2−} ions.

== Halides ==
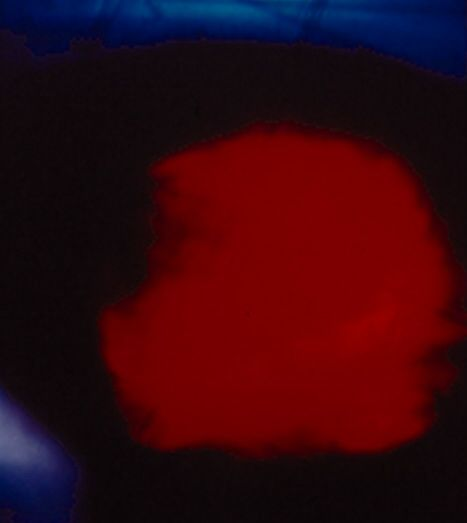
Einsteinium(III) iodide glowing in the dark

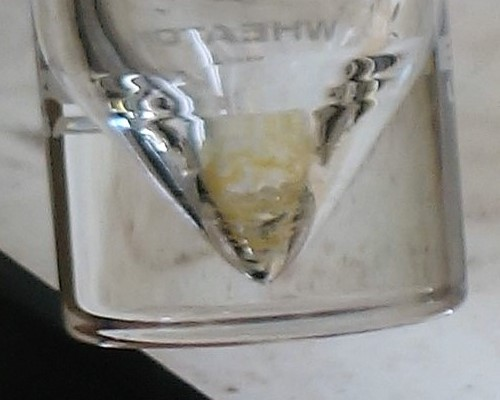
Einsteinium(III) chloride salts dissolved in water

Einsteinium halides are known for the oxidation states +2 and +3. The most stable state is +3 for all halides from fluoride to iodide.

Einsteinium(III) fluoride (EsF_{3}) can be precipitated from einsteinium(III) chloride solutions upon reaction with fluoride ions. An alternative preparation procedure is to exposure einsteinium(III) oxide to chlorine trifluoride (ClF_{3}) or F_{2} gas at a pressure of 1–2 atmospheres and a temperature between 300 and 400 °C. The EsF_{3} crystal structure is hexagonal, as in californium(III) fluoride (CfF_{3}) where the Es^{3+} ions are 8-fold coordinated by fluorine ions in a bicapped trigonal prism arrangement.

Einsteinium(III) chloride (EsCl_{3}) can be prepared by annealing einsteinium(III) oxide in the atmosphere of dry hydrogen chloride vapors at about 500 °C for some 20 minutes. It crystallizes upon cooling at about 425 °C into an orange solid with a hexagonal structure of UCl_{3} type, where einsteinium atoms are 9-fold coordinated by chlorine atoms in a tricapped trigonal prism geometry. Einsteinium(III) bromide (EsBr_{3}) is a pale-yellow solid with a monoclinic structure of AlCl_{3} type, where the einsteinium atoms are octahedrally coordinated by bromine (coordination number 6).

The divalent compounds of einsteinium are obtained by reducing the trivalent halides with hydrogen:

2 EsX_{3} + H_{2} → 2 EsX_{2} + 2 HX, X = F, Cl, Br, I

Einsteinium(II) chloride (EsCl_{2}), einsteinium(II) bromide (EsBr_{2}), and einsteinium(II) iodide (EsI_{2}) have been produced and characterized by optical absorption, with no structural information available yet.

Known oxyhalides of einsteinium include EsOCl, EsOBr and EsOI. These salts are synthesized by treating a trihalide with a vapor mixture of water and the corresponding hydrogen halide: for example, EsCl_{3} + H_{2}O/HCl to obtain EsOCl.

== Organoeinsteinium compounds ==
The high radioactivity of einsteinium has a potential use in radiation therapy, and organometallic complexes have been synthesized in order to deliver einsteinium atoms to an appropriate organ in the body. Experiments have been performed on injecting einsteinium citrate (as well as fermium compounds) to dogs. Einsteinium(III) was also incorporated into beta-diketone chelate complexes, since analogous complexes with lanthanides previously showed strongest UV-excited luminescence among metallorganic compounds. When preparing einsteinium complexes, the Es^{3+} ions were 1000 times diluted with Gd^{3+} ions. This allowed reducing the radiation damage so that the compounds did not disintegrate during the period of 20 minutes required for the measurements. The resulting luminescence from Es^{3+} was much too weak to be detected. This was explained by the unfavorable relative energies of the individual constituents of the compound that hindered efficient energy transfer from the chelate matrix to Es^{3+} ions. Similar conclusion was drawn for other actinides americium, berkelium and fermium.

Luminescence of Es^{3+} ions was however observed in inorganic hydrochloric acid solutions as well as in organic solution with di(2-ethylhexyl)orthophosphoric acid. It shows a broad peak at about 1064 nanometres (half-width about 100 nm) which can be resonantly excited by green light (ca. 495 nm wavelength). The luminescence has a lifetime of several microseconds and the quantum yield below 0.1%. The relatively high non-radiative decay rates in Es^{3+}, compared to lanthanides, were associated with the stronger interaction of f-electrons with the inner Es^{3+} electrons.

== See also ==
- Californium compounds
- Berkelium compounds
