= Californium compounds =

Few compounds of californium have been made and studied. The only californium ion that is stable in aqueous solutions is the californium(III) cation. The other two oxidation states are IV (strong oxidizing agents) and II (strong reducing agents). The element forms a water-soluble chloride, nitrate, perchlorate, and sulfate and is precipitated as a fluoride, oxalate or hydroxide. If problems of availability of the element could be overcome, then CfBr_{2} and CfI_{2} would likely be stable.

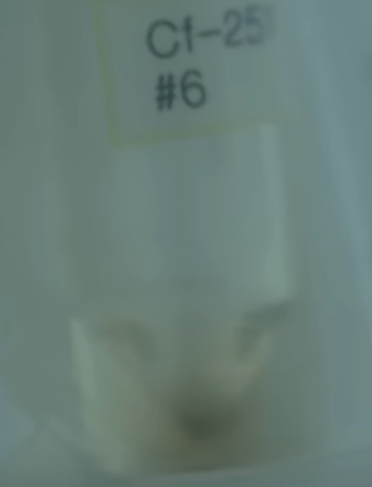
Californium(III) nitrate

The +3 oxidation state is represented by californium(III) oxide (yellow-green, Cf_{2}O_{3}), californium(III) fluoride (bright green, CfF_{3}) and californium(III) iodide (lemon yellow, CfI_{3}). Other +3 oxidation states include the sulfide and metallocene. Californium(IV) oxide (black brown, CfO_{2}), californium(IV) fluoride (green, CfF_{4}) represent the IV oxidation state. The II state is represented by californium(II) bromide (yellow, CfBr_{2}) and californium(II) iodide (dark violet, CfI_{2}).

== Compounds ==
Californium(IV) oxide (CfO_{2}) is a black-brown solid that has a cubic crystal structure with a lattice parameter, the distance between unit cells in the crystal, of 531.0 ± 0.2 pm. Crystals of californium(III) oxide normally have a body-centered cubic symmetry. They convert to a monoclinic form upon heating to about 1400 °C and melt at 1750 °C.

Californium(III) chloride (CfCl_{3}) is an emerald green compound with a hexagonal structure that can be prepared by reacting Cf_{2}O_{3} with hydrochloric acid at 500 °C. CfCl_{3} is then used as a feeder stock to form the yellow-orange triiodide CfI_{3}, which in turn can be reduced to the lavender-violet diiodide CfI_{2}.

Californium(III) fluoride (CfF_{3}) is a yellow-green solid with a crystal symmetry that gradually changes from orthorhombic to trigonal when heated above room temperature. Californium(IV) fluoride (CfF_{4}) is a bright green solid with a monoclinic crystal structure.

Californium(II) iodide (CfI_{2}) is a deep purple solid with a stable rhombohedral structure at room temperature and an unstable hexagonal structure. Californium(III) iodide (CfI_{3}) is a lemon-yellow solid that has a rhombohedral structure and sublimes at ~800 °C.

Californium(III) oxyfluoride (CfOF) is prepared by hydrolysis of californium(III) fluoride (CfF_{3}) at high temperature. Californium(III) oxychloride (CfOCl) is prepared by hydrolysis of the hydrate of californium(III) chloride at 280–320 °C.

Heating the sulfate in air at about 1200 °C and then reducing with hydrogen at 500 °C produces the sesquioxide (Cf_{2}O_{3}). The hydroxide Cf(OH)_{3} and the trifluoride CfF_{3} are slightly soluble.

Californium(III) oxychloride (CfOCl) was the first californium compound to be discovered.

Californium(III) polyborate is unusual in that californium is covalently bound to the borate.

Tris(cyclopentadienyl)californium(III) (Cp_{3}Cf) presents itself as ruby red crystals. This cyclopentadienyl complex has been prepared by the reaction between Cp_{2}Be and CfCl_{3} on a microgram scale and characterized by X-ray crystallography. Californium is the second-heaviest element for which an organometallic compound is known. A bent californium metallocene has also been isolated and characterized.

== See also ==
- Californium
- Compounds of berkelium
- Einsteinium compounds

== Bibliography ==
- Cotton, F. Albert; Wilkinson, Geoffrey; Murillo, Carlos A.; Bochmann, Manfred (1999). Advanced Inorganic Chemistry (6th ed.). New York City: John Wiley & Sons. ISBN 0-471-19957-5.
- CRC contributors (2006). David R. Lide (ed.). Handbook of Chemistry and Physics (87th ed.). Boca Raton, Florida: CRC Press, Taylor & Francis Group. ISBN 0-8493-0487-3.
- Cunningham, B. B. (1968). "Californium". In Clifford A. Hampel (ed.). The Encyclopedia of the Chemical Elements. New York City: Reinhold Book Corporation. LCCN 68-29938.
- Greenwood, N. N.; Earnshaw, A. (1997). Chemistry of the Elements (2nd ed.). Oxford, England: Butterworth-Heinemann. ISBN 0-7506-3365-4.
- Jakubke, Hans-Dieter; Jeschkeit, Hans, eds. (1994). Concise Encyclopedia Chemistry. trans. rev. Eagleson, Mary. Berlin: Walter de Gruyter. ISBN 3-11-011451-8.
- Seaborg, Glenn T. (2004). "Californium". In Geller, Elizabeth (ed.). Concise Encyclopedia of Chemistry. New York City: McGraw-Hill. p. 94. ISBN 0-07-143953-6.
