= Einsteinium iodide =

Einsteinium iodide may refer to:

- Einsteinium(II) iodide
- Einsteinium(III) iodide

== See also ==
- Einsteinium chloride
- Einsteinium bromide
