= Einsteinium bromide =

Einsteinium bromide may refer to:

- Einsteinium(II) bromide
- Einsteinium(III) bromide

== See also ==
- Einsteinium chloride
- Einsteinium iodide
