= Einsteinium chloride =

Einsteinium chloride may refer to:

- Einsteinium(II) chloride
- Einsteinium(III) chloride

== See also ==
- Einsteinium bromide
- Einsteinium iodide
