= Californium =

Californium, _{98}Cf
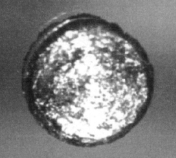

Californium
- Pronunciation: /ˌkæləˈfɔːrniəm/ (KAL-ə-FOR-nee-əm)
- Appearance: silvery
- Mass number: [251]

Californium in the periodic table
Hydrogen																															Helium
Lithium	Beryllium																									Boron	Carbon	Nitrogen	Oxygen	Fluorine	Neon
Sodium	Magnesium																									Aluminium	Silicon	Phosphorus	Sulfur	Chlorine	Argon
Potassium	Calcium															Scandium	Titanium	Vanadium	Chromium	Manganese	Iron	Cobalt	Nickel	Copper	Zinc	Gallium	Germanium	Arsenic	Selenium	Bromine	Krypton
Rubidium	Strontium															Yttrium	Zirconium	Niobium	Molybdenum	Technetium	Ruthenium	Rhodium	Palladium	Silver	Cadmium	Indium	Tin	Antimony	Tellurium	Iodine	Xenon
Caesium	Barium	Lanthanum	Cerium	Praseodymium	Neodymium	Promethium	Samarium	Europium	Gadolinium	Terbium	Dysprosium	Holmium	Erbium	Thulium	Ytterbium	Lutetium	Hafnium	Tantalum	Tungsten	Rhenium	Osmium	Iridium	Platinum	Gold	Mercury (element)	Thallium	Lead	Bismuth	Polonium	Astatine	Radon
Francium	Radium	Actinium	Thorium	Protactinium	Uranium	Neptunium	Plutonium	Americium	Curium	Berkelium	Californium	Einsteinium	Fermium	Mendelevium	Nobelium	Lawrencium	Rutherfordium	Dubnium	Seaborgium	Bohrium	Hassium	Meitnerium	Darmstadtium	Roentgenium	Copernicium	Nihonium	Flerovium	Moscovium	Livermorium	Tennessine	Oganesson
Dy
↑
Cf
↓
(Utn)
berkelium ← californium → einsteinium
- Atomic number (Z): 98
- Group: f-block groups (no number)
- Period: period 7
- Block: f-block
- Electron configuration: [Rn] 5f^{10} 7s^{2}
- Electrons per shell: 2, 8, 18, 32, 28, 8, 2

Physical properties
- Phase at STP: solid
- Melting point: 1173 K (900 °C, 1652 °F)
- Boiling point: 1743 K (1470 °C, 2678 °F) (estimation)
- Density (near r.t.): 15.1 g/cm^{3}

Atomic properties
- Oxidation states: common: +3 +2, +4, +5
- Electronegativity: Pauling scale: 1.3
- Ionization energies: 1st: 608 kJ/mol; 2nd: 1138.5 kJ/mol
- Covalent radius: 168 pm (single-bond)
- Van der Waals radius: 245 pm
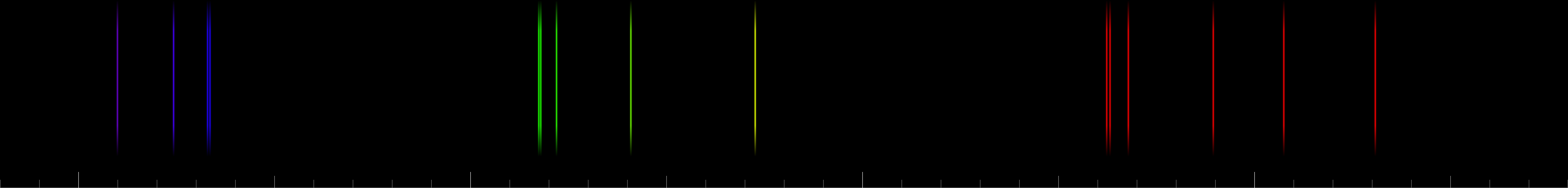
- Spectral lines of californium

Other properties
- Natural occurrence: synthetic
- Crystal structure: double hexagonal close-packed (dhcp)
- Mohs hardness: 3–4
- CAS Number: 7440-71-3

History
- Naming: after California, where it was discovered
- Discovery: S. G. Thompson, K. Street, Jr., A. Ghiorso and G. T. Seaborg (Lawrence Berkeley National Laboratory) (1950)
- First isolation: R. G. Haire and R. D. Baybarz (1974)

Isotopes of californium
Main isotopes			Decay	
Isotope	abundance	half-life (t_{1/2})	mode	product
^{248}Cf	synth	333.5 d	α100%	^{244}Cm
^{248}Cf	synth	333.5 d	SF<0.01%	–
^{249}Cf	(unstable)	351 y	α100%	^{245}Cm
^{249}Cf	(unstable)	351 y	SF≪0.01%	–
^{250}Cf	synth	13.08 y	α99.9%	^{246}Cm
^{250}Cf	synth	13.08 y	SF0.08%	–
^{251}Cf	(unstable)	898 y	α	^{247}Cm
^{252}Cf	(unstable)	2.645 y	α96.9%	^{248}Cm
^{252}Cf	(unstable)	2.645 y	SF3.1%	–
^{253}Cf	synth	17.81 d	β^{−}99.7%	^{253}Es
^{253}Cf	synth	17.81 d	α0.31%	^{249}Cm
^{254}Cf	synth	60.5 d	SF99.7%	–
^{254}Cf	synth	60.5 d	α0.31%	^{250}Cm

Californium is a synthetic chemical element; it has symbol Cf and atomic number 98. It was first synthesized in 1950 at Lawrence Berkeley National Laboratory (then the University of California Radiation Laboratory) by bombarding curium with alpha particles (helium-4 ions). It is an actinide element, the sixth transuranium element to be synthesized, and has the second-highest atomic mass of all elements that have been produced in amounts large enough to see with the naked eye (after einsteinium). It was named after the university and the U.S. state of California.

Two crystalline forms exist at normal pressure: one above and one below 900 °C (1,650 °F). A third form exists at high pressure. Californium slowly tarnishes in air at room temperature. Californium compounds are dominated by the +3 oxidation state. The most stable of californium's twenty known isotopes is californium-251, with a half-life of 898 years. This short half-life means the element is not found in significant quantities in the Earth's crust. (Note: The Earth formed 4.5 billion years ago, and the extent of natural neutron emission within it that could produce californium from more stable elements is extremely limited.) ^{252}Cf, with a half-life of about 2.645 years, is the most common isotope used and is produced at Oak Ridge National Laboratory (ORNL) in the United States and Research Institute of Atomic Reactors in Russia.

Californium is one of the few transuranium elements with practical uses. Most of these applications exploit the fact that certain isotopes of californium emit neutrons. For example, californium can be used to help start up nuclear reactors, and it is used as a source of neutrons when studying materials using neutron diffraction and neutron spectroscopy. It can also be used in nuclear synthesis of higher mass elements; oganesson (element 118) was synthesized by bombarding californium-249 atoms with calcium-48 ions. Users of californium must take into account radiological concerns and the element's ability to disrupt the formation of red blood cells by bioaccumulating in skeletal tissue.

== Characteristics ==
=== Physical properties ===
Californium is a silvery-white actinide metal with a melting point of 900 ± 30 °C (1,650 ± 50 °F) and an estimated boiling point of 1,743 K (1,470 °C; 2,680 °F). The pure metal is malleable and is easily cut with a knife. Californium metal starts to vaporize above 300 °C (570 °F) when exposed to a vacuum. Below 51 K (−222 °C; −368 °F) californium metal is either ferromagnetic or ferrimagnetic (it acts like a magnet), between 48 and 66 K it is antiferromagnetic (an intermediate state), and above 160 K (−113 °C; −172 °F) it is paramagnetic (external magnetic fields can make it magnetic). It forms alloys with lanthanide metals but little is known about the resulting materials.

The element has two crystalline forms at standard atmospheric pressure: a double-hexagonal close-packed form dubbed alpha (α) and a face-centered cubic form designated beta (β). (Note: A double hexagonal close-packed (dhcp) unit cell consists of two hexagonal close-packed structures that share a common hexagonal plane, giving dhcp an ABACABAC sequence.) The α form exists below 600–800 °C with a density of 15.10 g/cm^{3} and the β form exists above 600–800 °C with a density of 8.74 g/cm^{3}. At 48 GPa of pressure the β form changes into an orthorhombic crystal system due to delocalization of the atom's 5f electrons, which frees them to bond. (Note: The three lower-mass transplutonium elements—americium, curium, and berkelium—require much less pressure to delocalize their 5f electrons.)

The bulk modulus of a material is a measure of its resistance to uniform pressure. Californium's bulk modulus is 50±5 GPa, which is similar to trivalent lanthanide metals but smaller than more familiar metals, such as aluminium (70 GPa).

=== Chemical properties and compounds ===
Representative californium compounds (Note: Other +3 oxidation states include the sulfide and metallocene.)
state	compound	formula	color
+2	californium(II) bromide	CfBr_{2}	yellow
+2	californium(II) iodide	CfI_{2}	dark violet
+3	californium(III) oxide	Cf_{2}O_{3}	yellow-green
+3	californium(III) fluoride	CfF_{3}	bright green
+3	californium(III) chloride	CfCl_{3}	emerald green
+3	californium(III) bromide	CfBr_{3}	yellowish green
+3	californium(III) iodide	CfI_{3}	lemon yellow
+3	californium(III) polyborate	Cf[B_{6}O_{8}(OH)_{5}]	pale green
+4	californium(IV) oxide	CfO_{2}	black brown
+4	californium(IV) fluoride	CfF_{4}	green

Californium exhibits oxidation states of 4, 3, or 2. It typically forms eight or nine bonds to surrounding atoms or ions. Its chemical properties are predicted to be similar to other primarily 3+ valence actinide elements and the element dysprosium, which is the lanthanide above californium in the periodic table. Compounds in the +4 oxidation state are strong oxidizing agents and those in the +2 state are strong reducing agents.

The element slowly tarnishes in air at room temperature, with the rate increasing when moisture is added. Californium reacts when heated with hydrogen, nitrogen, or a chalcogen (oxygen family element); reactions with dry hydrogen and aqueous mineral acids are rapid.

Californium is only water-soluble as the californium(III) cation. Attempts to reduce or oxidize the +3 ion in solution have failed. The element forms a water-soluble chloride, nitrate, perchlorate, and sulfate and is precipitated as a fluoride, oxalate, or hydroxide. Californium is the heaviest actinide to exhibit covalent properties, as is observed in californium borate.

=== Isotopes ===
All nuclear data not otherwise stated is from the standard source:

Twenty isotopes of californium are known with mass number ranging from 237 to 256; the most stable are ^{251}Cf with half-life 898 years, ^{249}Cf with half-life 351 years, ^{250}Cf at 13.08 years, and ^{252}Cf at 2.645 years. All other isotopes have half-life shorter than a year, and most of these have half-lives less than 20 minutes.

^{249}Cf is formed by beta decay of berkelium-249, and heavier californium isotopes are made by subjecting berkelium to intense neutron radiation in a nuclear reactor. Though californium-251 has the longest half-life, its production yield is relatively low due to its rapid depletion by reaction with another neutron (high neutron cross section).

^{252}Cf is a very strong neutron emitter, which makes it an extremely hazardous radioactive isotope. ^{252}Cf, 96.9% of the time, alpha decays to curium-248; the other 3.1% of decays are spontaneous fission. One microgram of ^{252}Cf emits 2.3 million neutrons per second (about 3.7 neutrons per fission). The other main isotopes of californium (248-251) also alpha decay to those of curium, with a much smaller fraction of fission.

== History ==
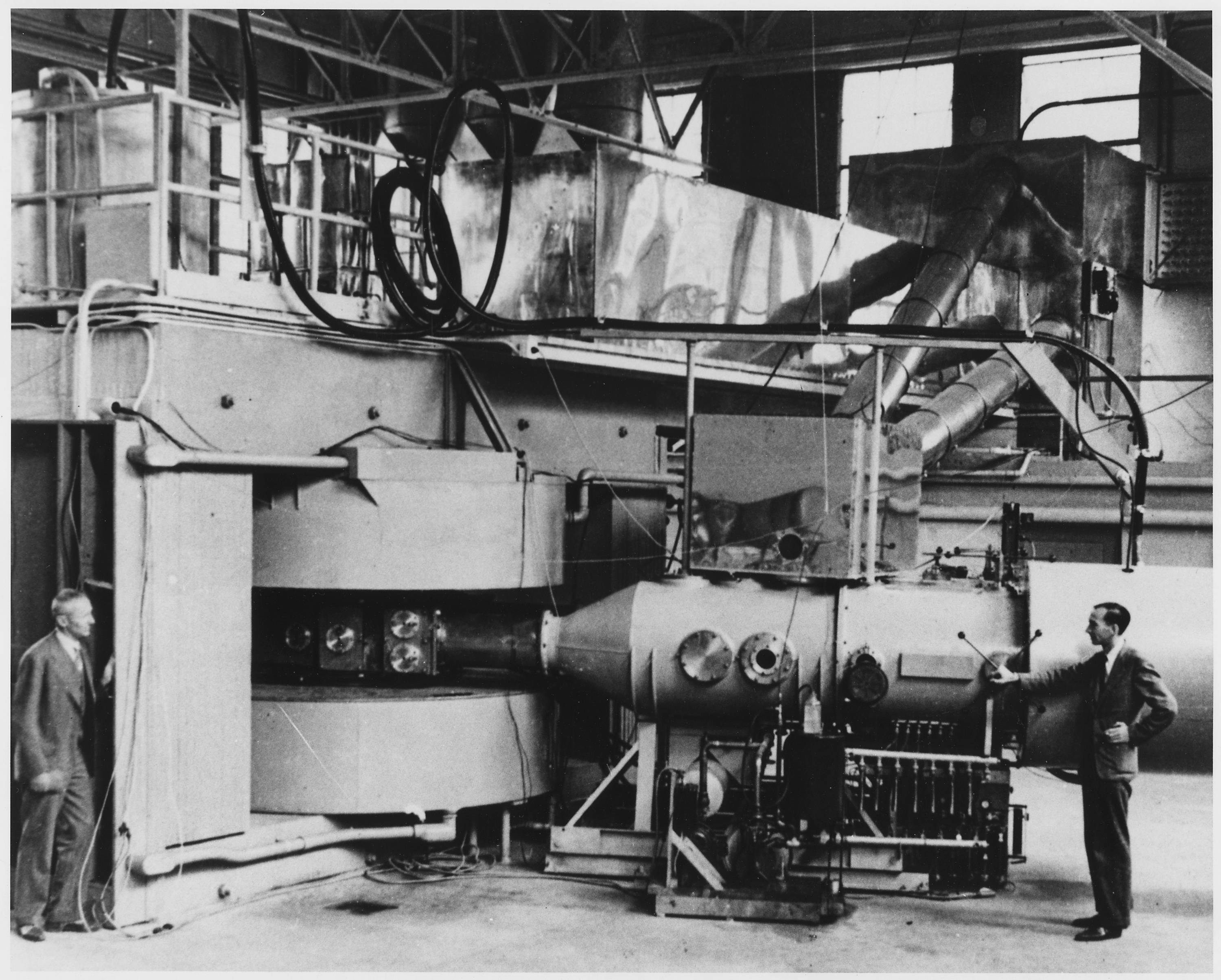
The 60-inch-diameter (1.52 m) cyclotron used to first synthesize californium

Californium was first made at University of California Radiation Laboratory, Berkeley, by physics researchers Stanley Gerald Thompson, Kenneth Street Jr., Albert Ghiorso, and Glenn T. Seaborg, about February 9, 1950. It was the sixth transuranium element to be discovered; the team announced its discovery on March 17, 1950.

To produce californium, a microgram-size target of curium-242 (^{242}Cm) was bombarded with 35 MeV alpha particles (^{4}He) in the 60-inch-diameter (1.52 m) cyclotron at Berkeley, which produced californium-245 (^{245}Cf) plus one free neutron (n).

^{242}_{96}Cm + ^{4}_{2}He → ^{245}_{98}Cf + ^{1}_{0}n

To identify and separate out the element, ion exchange and adsorption methods were undertaken. Only about 5,000 atoms of californium were produced in this experiment, and these atoms had a half-life of 44 minutes.

The discoverers named the new element after the university and the state. This was a break from the convention used for elements 95 to 97, which drew inspiration from how the elements directly above them in the periodic table were named. (Note: Europium, in the sixth period directly above element 95, was named for the continent it was discovered on, so element 95 was named americium. Element 96 was named curium for Marie Curie and Pierre Curie as an analog to the naming of gadolinium, which was named for the scientist and engineer Johan Gadolin. Terbium was named for the village it was discovered in, so element 97 was named berkelium.) However, the element directly above element 98 in the periodic table, dysprosium, has a name that means "hard to get at", so the researchers decided to set aside the informal naming convention. They added that "the best we can do is to point out [that] ... searchers a century ago found it difficult to get to California".

Weighable amounts of californium were first produced by the irradiation of plutonium targets at Materials Testing Reactor at National Reactor Testing Station, eastern Idaho; these findings were reported in 1954. The high spontaneous fission rate of californium-252 was observed in these samples. The first experiment with californium in concentrated form occurred in 1958. The isotopes ^{249}Cf to ^{252}Cf were isolated that same year from a sample of plutonium-239 that had been irradiated with neutrons in a nuclear reactor for five years. Two years later, in 1960, Burris Cunningham and James Wallman of Lawrence Radiation Laboratory of the University of California created the first californium compounds—californium trichloride, californium(III) oxychloride, and californium oxide—by treating californium with steam and hydrochloric acid.

The High Flux Isotope Reactor (HFIR) at ORNL in Oak Ridge, Tennessee, started producing small batches of californium in the 1960s. By 1995, HFIR nominally produced 500 milligrams (0.018 oz) of californium annually. Plutonium supplied by the United Kingdom to the United States under the 1958 US–UK Mutual Defence Agreement was used for making californium.

The Atomic Energy Commission sold ^{252}Cf to industrial and academic customers in the early 1970s for $10/microgram, and an average of 150 mg (0.0053 oz) of ^{252}Cf were shipped each year from 1970 to 1990. (Note: The Nuclear Regulatory Commission replaced the Atomic Energy Commission when the Energy Reorganization Act of 1974 was implemented. The price of californium-252 was increased by the NRC several times and was $60 per microgram by 1999; this price does not include the cost of encapsulation and transportation.) Californium metal was first prepared in 1974 by Haire and Baybarz, who reduced californium(III) oxide with lanthanum metal to obtain microgram amounts of sub-micrometer thick films. (Note: In 1975, another paper stated that the californium metal prepared the year before was the hexagonal compound Cf_{2}O_{2}S and face-centered cubic compound CfS. The 1974 work was confirmed in 1976 and work on californium metal continued.)

== Occurrence ==
Traces of californium can be found near facilities that use the element in mineral prospecting and in medical treatments. The element is fairly insoluble in water, but it adheres well to ordinary soil; and concentrations of it in the soil can be 500 times higher than in the water surrounding the soil particles.

Nuclear fallout from atmospheric nuclear weapons testing prior to 1980 contributed a small amount of californium to the environment. Californium-249, -252, -253, and -254 have been observed in the radioactive dust collected from the air after a nuclear explosion. Californium is not a major radionuclide at United States Department of Energy legacy sites since it was not produced in large quantities.

Californium was once believed to be produced in supernovas, as their decay matches the 60-day half-life of ^{254}Cf. However, subsequent studies failed to demonstrate any californium spectra, and supernova light curves are now thought to follow the decay of nickel-56. Within kilonovae, ^{254}Cf is produced via the r-process. The californium then decays primarily through spontaneous fission and powers the kilonova over the span of 15 to 250 days, brightening it by several magnitudes in infrared wavelengths.

The transuranic elements up to fermium, including californium, should have been present in the natural nuclear fission reactor at Oklo, but any quantities produced then would have long since decayed away.

== Production ==
Californium is produced in nuclear reactors and particle accelerators. Californium-250 is made by bombarding berkelium-249 (^{249}Bk) with neutrons, forming berkelium-250 (^{250}Bk) via neutron capture (n,γ) which, in turn, quickly beta decays (β^{−}) to californium-250 (^{250}Cf) in the following reaction:

^{249}_{97}Bk(n,γ)^{250}_{97}Bk → ^{250}_{98}Cf + β^{−}

Bombardment of ^{250}Cf with neutrons produces ^{251}Cf and ^{252}Cf.

Prolonged irradiation of americium, curium, and plutonium with neutrons produces milligram amounts of ^{252}Cf and microgram amounts of ^{249}Cf. As of 2006, curium isotopes 244 to 248 are irradiated by neutrons in special reactors to produce mainly californium-252 with lesser amounts of isotopes 249 to 255.

Microgram quantities of ^{252}Cf are available for commercial use through the U.S. Nuclear Regulatory Commission. Only two sites produce ^{252}Cf: Oak Ridge National Laboratory in the U.S., and the Research Institute of Atomic Reactors in Dimitrovgrad, Russia. As of 2003, the two sites produce 0.25 grams and 0.025 grams of ^{252}Cf per year, respectively.

Three californium isotopes with significant half-lives are produced, requiring a total of 15 neutron captures by uranium-238 without nuclear fission or alpha decay occurring during the process. ^{253}Cf is at the end of a production chain that starts with uranium-238, and includes several isotopes of plutonium, americium, curium, and berkelium, and the californium isotopes 249 to 253 (see diagram).

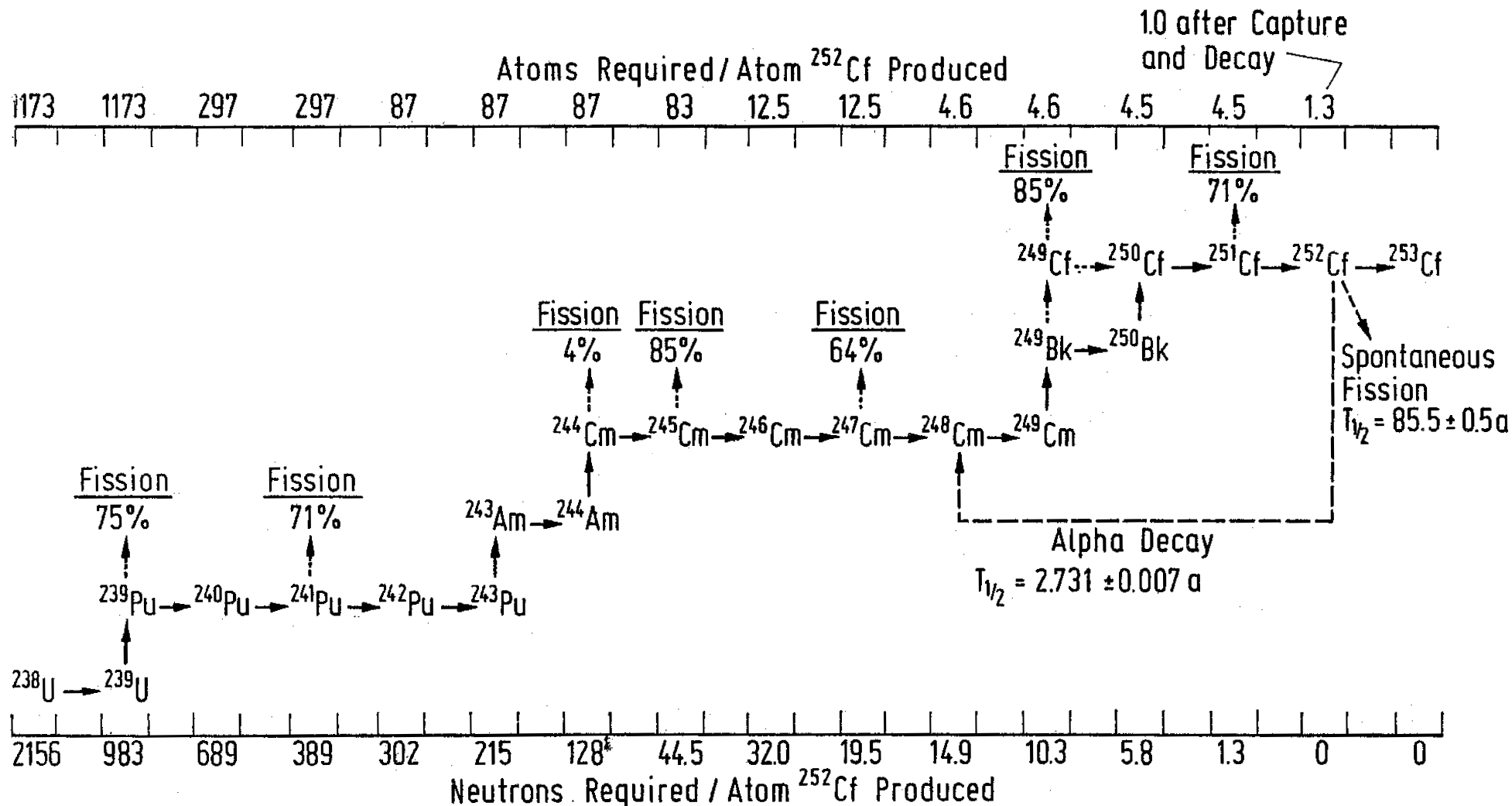
Scheme of the production of californium-252 from uranium-238 by neutron irradiation

== Applications ==
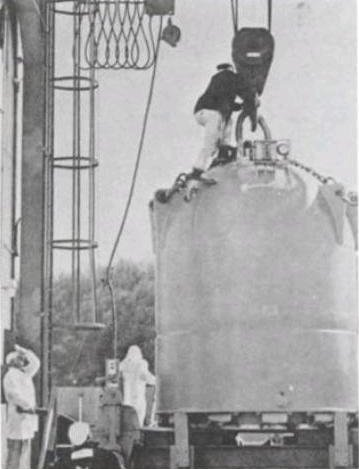
Fifty-ton shipping cask built at ORNL which can transport up to 1 gram of ^{252}Cf. Large and heavily shielded transport containers are needed to prevent the release of highly radioactive material in case of normal and hypothetical accidents.

=== Neutron source ===
^{252}Cf has a number of specialized uses as a strong neutron emitter; it produces 139 million neutrons per microgram per minute. This property makes it useful as a startup neutron source for some nuclear reactors and as a portable (non-reactor based) neutron source for neutron activation analysis to detect trace amounts of elements in samples. (Note: By 1990, californium-252 had replaced plutonium-beryllium neutron sources due to its smaller size and lower heat and gas generation.) Neutrons from californium are used as a treatment of certain cervical and brain cancers where other radiation therapy is ineffective. It has been used in educational applications since 1969 when Georgia Institute of Technology got a loan of 119 μg of ^{252}Cf from the Savannah River Site. It is also used with online elemental coal analyzers and bulk material analyzers in the coal and cement industries.

Neutron penetration into materials makes californium useful in detection instruments such as fuel rod scanners; neutron radiography of aircraft and weapons components to detect corrosion, bad welds, cracks and trapped moisture; and in portable metal detectors. Neutron moisture gauges use ^{252}Cf to find water and petroleum layers in oil wells, as a portable neutron source for gold and silver prospecting for on-the-spot analysis, and to detect ground water movement. The main uses of ^{252}Cf in 1982 were, reactor start-up (48.3%), fuel rod scanning (25.3%), and activation analysis (19.4%). By 1994, most ^{252}Cf was used in neutron radiography (77.4%), with fuel rod scanning (12.1%) and reactor start-up (6.9%) as important but secondary uses. In 2021, fast neutrons from ^{252}Cf were used for wireless data transmission.

=== Superheavy element production ===
In October 2006, researchers announced that three atoms of oganesson (element 118) had been identified at Joint Institute for Nuclear Research in Dubna, Russia, from bombarding ^{249}Cf with calcium-48, making it the heaviest element ever made. The target contained about 10 mg of ^{249}Cf deposited on a titanium foil of 32 cm^{2} area. Californium has also been used to produce other transuranic elements; for example, lawrencium was first synthesized in 1961 by bombarding californium with boron nuclei.

=== Hypothetical nuclear weapons ===
^{251}Cf has a very small calculated critical mass of about 5 kg (11 lb), high lethality, and a relatively short period of toxic environmental irradiation. The low critical mass of californium led to some exaggerated claims about possible uses for the element. (Note: An article entitled "Facts and Fallacies of World War III" in the July 1961 edition of Popular Science magazine read "A californium atomic bomb need be no bigger than a pistol bullet. You could build a hand-held six-shooter to fire bullets that would explode on contact with the force of 10 tons of TNT.")

== Precautions ==
Californium that bioaccumulates in skeletal tissue releases radiation that disrupts the body's ability to form red blood cells. The element plays no natural biological role in any organism due to its intense radioactivity and low concentration in the environment.

Californium can enter the body from ingesting contaminated food or drinks or by breathing air with suspended particles of the element. Once in the body, only 0.05% of the californium will reach the bloodstream. About 65% of that californium will be deposited in the skeleton, 25% in the liver, and the rest in other organs, or excreted, mainly in urine. Half of the californium deposited in the skeleton and liver are gone in 50 and 20 years, respectively. Californium in the skeleton adheres to bone surfaces before slowly migrating throughout the bone.

The element is most dangerous if taken into the body. In addition, californium-249 and californium-251 can cause tissue damage externally, through gamma ray emission. Ionizing radiation emitted by californium on bone and in the liver can cause cancer.

== Bibliography ==
- Cotton, F. Albert; Wilkinson, Geoffrey; Murillo, Carlos A.; Bochmann, Manfred (1999). Advanced Inorganic Chemistry (6th ed.). John Wiley & Sons. ISBN 978-0-471-19957-1.
- Cunningham, B. B. (1968). "Californium". In Hampel, Clifford A. (ed.). The Encyclopedia of the Chemical Elements. Reinhold Book Corporation. LCCN 68029938.
- Emsley, John (1998). The Elements. Oxford University Press. ISBN 978-0-19-855818-7.
- Emsley, John (2001). "Californium". Nature's Building Blocks: An A-Z Guide to the Elements. Oxford University Press. ISBN 978-0-19-850340-8.
- Greenwood, N. N.; Earnshaw, A. (1997). Chemistry of the Elements (2nd ed.). Butterworth-Heinemann. ISBN 978-0-7506-3365-9.
- Haire, Richard G. (2006). "Californium". In Morss, Lester R.; Edelstein, Norman M.; Fuger, Jean (eds.). The Chemistry of the Actinide and Transactinide Elements (3rd ed.). Springer Science+Business Media. ISBN 978-1-4020-3555-5.
- Heiserman, David L. (1992). "Element 98: Californium". Exploring Chemical Elements and their Compounds. TAB Books. ISBN 978-0-8306-3018-9.
- Jakubke, Hans-Dieter; Jeschkeit, Hans, eds. (1994). Concise Encyclopedia Chemistry. trans. rev. Eagleson, Mary. Walter de Gruyter. ISBN 978-3-11-011451-5.
- Krebs, Robert (2006). The History and Use of our Earth's Chemical Elements: A Reference Guide. Greenwood Publishing Group. ISBN 978-0-313-33438-2.
- Lide, David R., ed. (2006). Handbook of Chemistry and Physics (87th ed.). CRC Press, Taylor & Francis Group. ISBN 978-0-8493-0487-3.
- National Research Council (U.S.). Committee on Radiation Source Use and Replacement (2008). Radiation Source Use and Replacement: Abbreviated Version. National Academies Press. ISBN 978-0-309-11014-3.
- O'Neil, Marydale J.; Heckelman, Patricia E.; Roman, Cherie B., eds. (2006). The Merck Index: An Encyclopedia of Chemicals, Drugs, and Biologicals (14th ed.). Merck Research Laboratories, Merck & Co. ISBN 978-0-911910-00-1.
- Osborne-Lee, I. W.; Alexander, C. W. (1995). "Californium-252: A Remarkable Versatile Radioisotope". Oak Ridge Technical Report ORNL/TM-12706. doi:10.2172/205871. OSTI 205871.
- Ruiz-Lapuente, P.; Canal, R.; Isern, J. (1996). Thermonuclear Supernovae. Springer Science+Business Media. ISBN 978-0-7923-4359-2.
- Seaborg, Glenn T.; Loveland, Walter D. (1990). The Elements Beyond Uranium. John Wiley & Sons, Inc. ISBN 978-0-471-89062-1.
- Seaborg, Glenn T. (1994). Modern alchemy: selected papers of Glenn T. Seaborg. World Scientific. ISBN 978-981-02-1440-1.
- Seaborg, Glenn T. (1996). Adloff, J. P. (ed.). One Hundred Years after the Discovery of Radioactivity. Oldenbourg Wissenschaftsverlag. ISBN 978-3-486-64252-0.
- Seaborg, Glenn T. (2004). "Californium". In Geller, Elizabeth (ed.). Concise Encyclopedia of Chemistry. McGraw-Hill. p. 94. ISBN 978-0-07-143953-4.
- Szwacki, Nevill Gonzalez; Szwacka, Teresa (2010). Basic Elements of Crystallography. Pan Stanford. ISBN 978-981-4241-59-5.
- Walker, Perrin; Tarn, William H., eds. (1991). Handbook of Metal Etchants. CRC Press. ISBN 978-0-8493-3623-2.
- Weeks, Mary Elvira; Leichester, Henry M. (1968). "21: Modern Alchemy". Discovery of the Elements. Journal of Chemical Education. pp. 848–850. ISBN 978-0-7661-3872-8. LCCN 68015217.
