= Einsteinium oxychloride =

Identifiers
CAS Number	24645-87-2
3D model (JSmol)	Interactive image
- InChI: InChI=1S/ClH.Es.O/h1H;;/q;+3;-2/p-1 Key: YARCSGSHMRCRCQ-UHFFFAOYSA-M
- SMILES: [Es+3].[Cl-].[O-2]

Properties
Chemical formula	EsClO
Molar mass	303 g/mol
Appearance	solid

Related compounds
Related compounds	Californium oxychloride Berkelium oxychloride
- Except where otherwise noted, data are given for materials in their standard state (at 25 °C [77 °F], 100 kPa). Infobox references

Einsteinium oxychloride is an inorganic chemical compound of einsteinium, oxygen, and chlorine with the chemical formula EsClO. It can be prepared by heating einsteinium oxide in a gaseous mixture of HCl and H_{2}O at 500 °C for 20 minutes.
