= Soil moisture sensor =

Instrument to measure soil water content

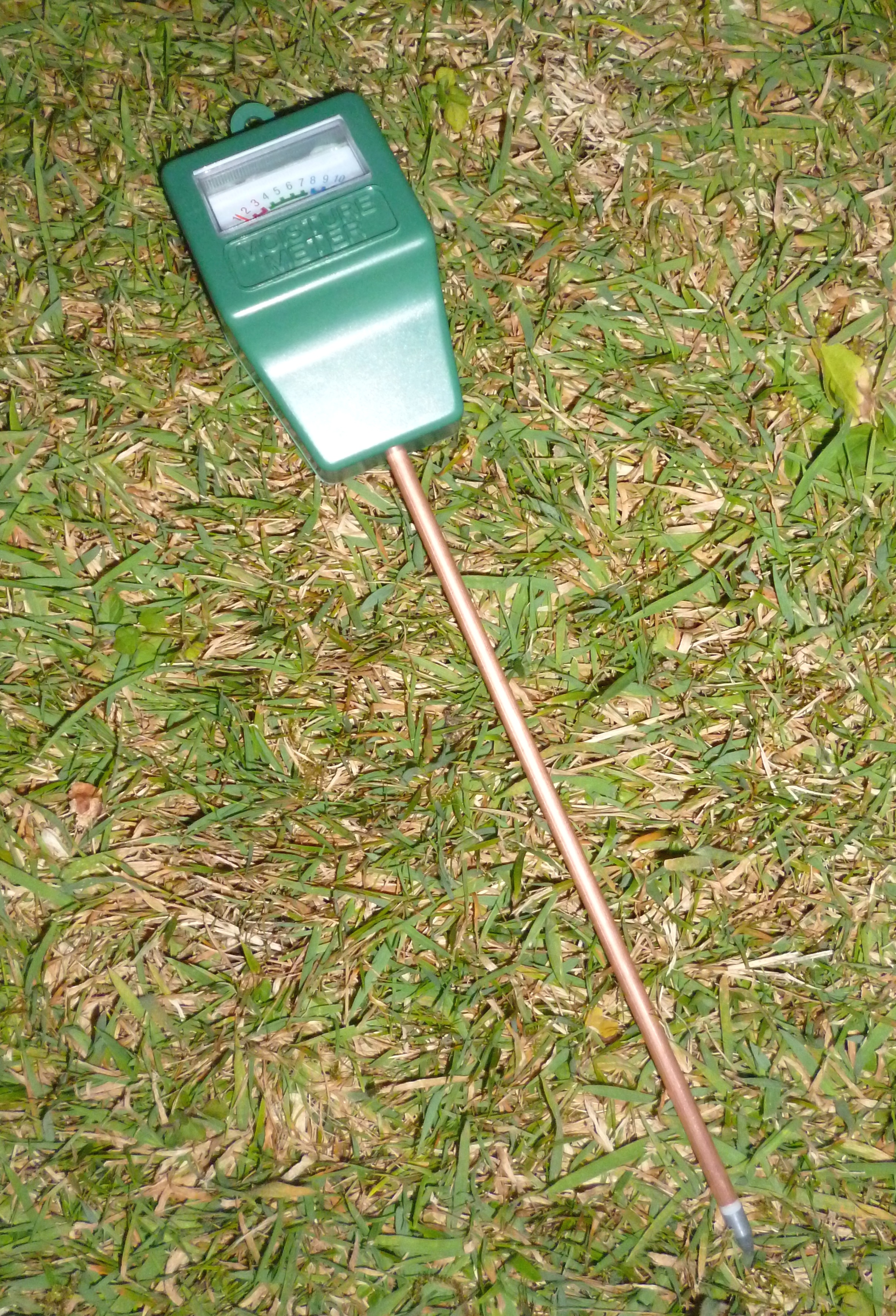
A simple soil moisture sensor for gardeners.

Soil moisture sensors measure the volumetric water content in soil. Since the direct gravimetric measurement of free soil moisture requires removing, drying, and weighing of a sample, soil moisture sensors measure the volumetric water content indirectly by using some other property of the soil, such as electrical resistance, dielectric constant, or interaction with neutrons, as a proxy for the moisture content.

The relation between the measured property and soil moisture must be calibrated and may vary depending on environmental factors such as soil type, temperature, or electric conductivity. Reflected microwave radiation is affected by the soil moisture and is used for remote sensing in hydrology and agriculture. Portable probe instruments can be used by farmers or gardeners.

Soil moisture sensors typically refer to sensors that estimate volumetric water content. Another class of sensors measure another property of moisture in soils called water potential; these sensors are usually referred to as soil water potential sensors and include tensiometers and gypsum blocks.

== Technology ==
Technologies commonly used to indirectly measure volumetric water content (soil moisture) include:

- Frequency Domain Reflectometry (FDR soil moisture sensor): Measuring the impedance by applying a measuring frequency of several hundred MHz to short rods forming a transmission line.
- So called capacitance sensors use an open capacitor formed by a large PCB area are as part of an oscillating circuit. They are similar to FDR sensors but operate below 1 MHz and are more prone to noise factors.
- Time Domain Reflectometry (TDR soil moisture sensor): The dielectric constant of a certain volume element around the sensor is obtained by measuring the speed of propagation along a short single ended transmission line.
- Time Domain Transmission (TDR soil moisture sensor): Same as with TDR the speed of propagation along a short transmission line is measured, while on one end sits the sender and the receiver resides on the other end.
- Neutron moisture gauges: The moderator properties of water for neutrons are utilized to estimate soil moisture content between a source and detector probe.
- Soil resistivity: Measuring how strongly the soil resists the flow of electricity between two electrodes can be used to determine the soil moisture content.
- Galvanic cell: The amount of water present can be determined based on the voltage the soil produces because water acts as an electrolyte and produces electricity. The technology behind this concept is the galvanic cell.

== Application ==
=== Agriculture ===
Measuring soil moisture is important for agricultural applications to help farmers manage their irrigation systems more efficiently. Knowing the exact soil moisture conditions on their fields, not only are farmers able to generally use less water to grow a crop, they are also able to increase yields and the quality of the crop by improved management of soil moisture during critical plant growth stages.

=== Landscape irrigation ===
In urban and suburban areas, landscapes and residential lawns are using soil moisture sensors to interface with an irrigation controller. Connecting a soil moisture sensor to a simple irrigation clock will convert it into a "smart" irrigation controller that prevents irrigation cycles when the soil is already wet, e.g. following a recent rainfall event.

Golf courses are using soil moisture sensors to increase the efficiency of their irrigation systems to prevent over-watering and leaching of fertilizers and other chemicals into the ground.

=== Research ===
Soil moisture sensors are used in numerous research applications, e.g. in agricultural science and horticulture including irrigation planning, climate research, or environmental science including solute transport studies and as auxiliary sensors for soil respiration measurements.

=== Simple sensors for gardeners ===
Relatively cheap and simple devices that do not require a power source are available for checking whether plants have sufficient moisture to thrive. After inserting a probe into the soil for approximately 60 seconds, a meter indicates if the soil is too dry, moist or wet for plants.

== See also ==
- Hygrometer
- Lysimeter
