= Americium chloride =

Americium chloride can refer to:

- Americium(II) chloride, AmCl_{2}
- Americium(III) chloride, AmCl_{3}
