= Californium(III) bromide =

Names
- IUPAC name Californium(III) bromide

Identifiers
CAS Number	28064-96-2; ^{249}Cf: 24297-29-8
3D model (JSmol)	Interactive image
ChemSpider	28548254
PubChem CID	^{249}Cf: 185562
CompTox Dashboard (EPA)	DTXSID901336619
- InChI: InChI=1S/3BrH.Cf/h3*1H;/p-3 Key: NJIJEQJUGGORBI-UHFFFAOYSA-K
- SMILES: [Br-].[Br-].[Br-].[Cf]

Properties
Chemical formula	Br_{3}Cf
Molar mass	491 g·mol^{−1}
Appearance	green solid

Structure
Crystal structure	Monoclinic, mS16
- Except where otherwise noted, data are given for materials in their standard state (at 25 °C [77 °F], 100 kPa). Infobox references

Californium(III) bromide is an inorganic compound, a salt with a chemical formula CfBr_{3}. Like in californium(III) oxide (Cf_{2}O_{3}) and other californium halides, including californium(III) fluoride (CfF_{3}), californium(III) chloride, and californium(III) iodide (CfI_{3}), the californium atom has an oxidation state of +3.

== Properties ==
Californium(III) bromide is shown to crystallize in both the AlCl_{3} and FeCl_{3} type structures. In the former structure, the californium ion is six coordinated and the three independent Cf-Br bond lengths are 279.5±0.9 pm, 282.7±1.1 pm, and 282.8±0.8 pm.

Californium(III) bromide partially decomposes into californium(II) bromide under high temperature.

2 CfBr_{3} → 2 CfBr_{2} + Br_{2}

In the radioactive decay of berkelium-249 to californium-249, the oxidation number and crystal structure are preserved. The six-coordinate berkelium(III) bromide (AlCl_{3}-type monoclinic structure) decays to produce a six-coordinate californium(III) bromide, whereas an eight-coordinate berkelium(III) bromide (PuBr_{3}-type, orthorhombic structure) produces an eight-coordinate californium(III) bromide.

== See also ==
- Californium
- Californium compounds
