= Einsteinium trifluoride =

Einsteinium fluoride
Names
- Other names Einsteinium(III) fluoride, einsteinium trifluoride

Identifiers
CAS Number	99644-27-6
3D model (JSmol)	Interactive image
ChemSpider	64887117
- InChI: InChI=1S/Es.3FH/h;3*1H/q+3;;;/p-3 Key: NYNVZWGCTJTDET-UHFFFAOYSA-K
- SMILES: [Es+3].[F-].[F-].[F-]

Properties
Chemical formula	EsF_{3}
Molar mass	309 g·mol^{−1}
Appearance	crystals
Solubility in water	insoluble

Related compounds
Related compounds	Californium(III) fluoride Berkelium(III) fluoride
- Except where otherwise noted, data are given for materials in their standard state (at 25 °C [77 °F], 100 kPa). Infobox references

Einsteinium fluoride is a binary inorganic chemical compound of einsteinium and fluorine with the chemical formula EsF_{3}.

== Synthesis ==
Einsteinium fluoride can be precipitated from einsteinium(III) chloride solutions upon reaction with fluoride ions. An alternative preparation procedure is to expose einsteinium(III) oxide to chlorine trifluoride (ClF_{3}) or F_{2} gas at a pressure of 1–2 atmospheres and a temperature between 300 and 400 °C. The EsF_{3} crystal structure is hexagonal, as in californium(III) fluoride (CfF_{3}) where the Es^{3+} ions are 8-fold coordinated by fluorine ions in a bicapped trigonal prism arrangement.

== Physical properties ==
The compound forms crystals and is insoluble in water.

== Chemical properties ==
The compound is reduced by metallic lithium:

EsF_{3} + 3Li → Es + 3 LiF
