= Berkelium(III) oxychloride =

Names
- Other names Berkelium oxychloride

Identifiers
CAS Number	20721-15-7
3D model (JSmol)	Interactive image
- InChI: InChI=1S/Bk.ClH.O/h;1H;/q+3;;-2/p-1 Key: NPTFQYVOKJMBAT-UHFFFAOYSA-M
- SMILES: [Bk+3].[Cl-].[O-2]

Properties
Chemical formula	BkClO
Molar mass	298 g·mol^{−1}
Appearance	very pale green crystals

Structure
Crystal structure	cubic

Related compounds
Related compounds	Einsteinium oxychloride Californium oxychloride
- Except where otherwise noted, data are given for materials in their standard state (at 25 °C [77 °F], 100 kPa). Infobox references

Berkelium(III) oxychloride is an inorganic compound of berkelium, chlorine, and oxygen with the chemical formula BkOCl.
