= Californium(II) iodide =

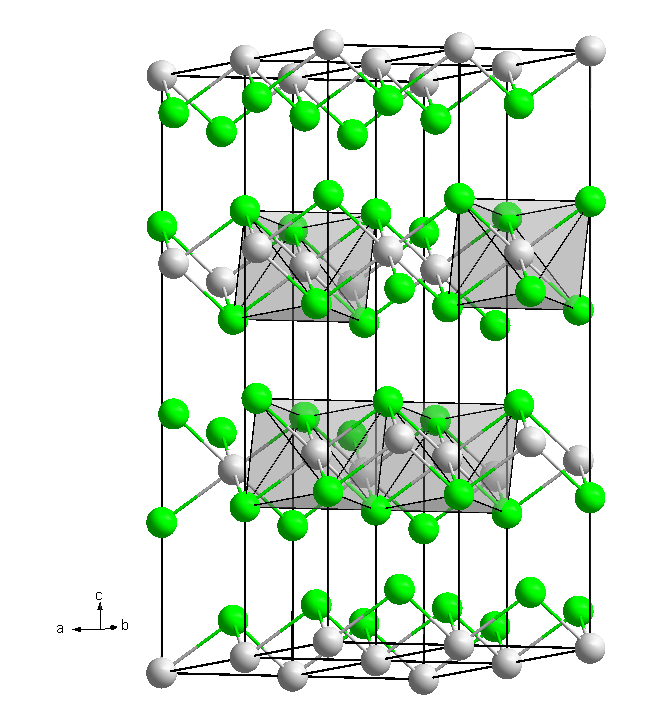

Names
- Other names Californium diiodide

Identifiers
CAS Number	49774-08-5
3D model (JSmol)	Interactive image
- InChI: InChI=1S/Cf.2HI/h;2*1H/q+2;;/p-2 Key: VNDYPDFEICMTGA-UHFFFAOYSA-L
- SMILES: [Cf+2].[I-].[I-]

Properties
Chemical formula	CfI_{2}
Molar mass	505 g·mol^{−1}
Appearance	dark purple solid
Density	g/cm^{3}
Solubility in water	insoluble

Structure
Crystal structure	cubic
- Except where otherwise noted, data are given for materials in their standard state (at 25 °C [77 °F], 100 kPa). Infobox references

Californium(II) iodide is a binary inorganic compound of californium and iodine with the formula CfI_{2}.

== Synthesis ==
It can be produced by reducing californium triiodide with hydrogen in a quartz thin tube at 570 °C:

2CfI_{3} + H_{2} → 2CfI_{2} + 2HI

== Physical properties ==
The compound forms a dark purple solid. At slightly higher temperatures, it melts and reacts with the silica in the thin tube, producing CfOI.

Californium diiodide has two crystal structures, one is CdCl_{2}-type crystal structure, stable at room temperature, with lattice parameters a = 743.4 ± 1.1 pm and α = 35.83 ± 0.07°; the other is metastable, of CdI_{2}-type with lattice parameters a = 455.7 ± 0.4 pm and c = 699.2 ± 0.6 pm. Californium diiodide has an absorption band in the wavelength range from 300 to 1100 nm, which proves the existence of Cf(II).
