= Prompt gamma neutron activation analysis =

Prompt-gamma neutron activation analysis (PGAA) is a very widely applicable technique for determining the presence and amount of many elements simultaneously in samples ranging in size from micrograms to many grams. It is a non-destructive method, and the chemical form and shape of the sample are relatively unimportant. Typical measurements take from a few minutes to several hours per sample.

The technique can be described as follows. The sample is continuously irradiated with a beam of neutrons. The constituent elements of the sample absorb some of these neutrons and emit prompt gamma rays which are measured with a gamma ray spectrometer. The energies of these gamma rays identify the neutron-capturing elements, while the intensities of the peaks at these energies reveal their concentrations. The amount of analyte element is given by the ratio of count rate of the characteristic peak in the sample to the rate in a known mass of the appropriate elemental standard irradiated under the same conditions.

Typically, the sample will not acquire significant long-lived radioactivity, and the sample may be removed from the facility and used for other purposes. One of the typical applications of PGAA is an online belt elemental analyzer or bulk material analyzer used in cement, coal and mineral industries.
