= Californium(III) oxyfluoride =

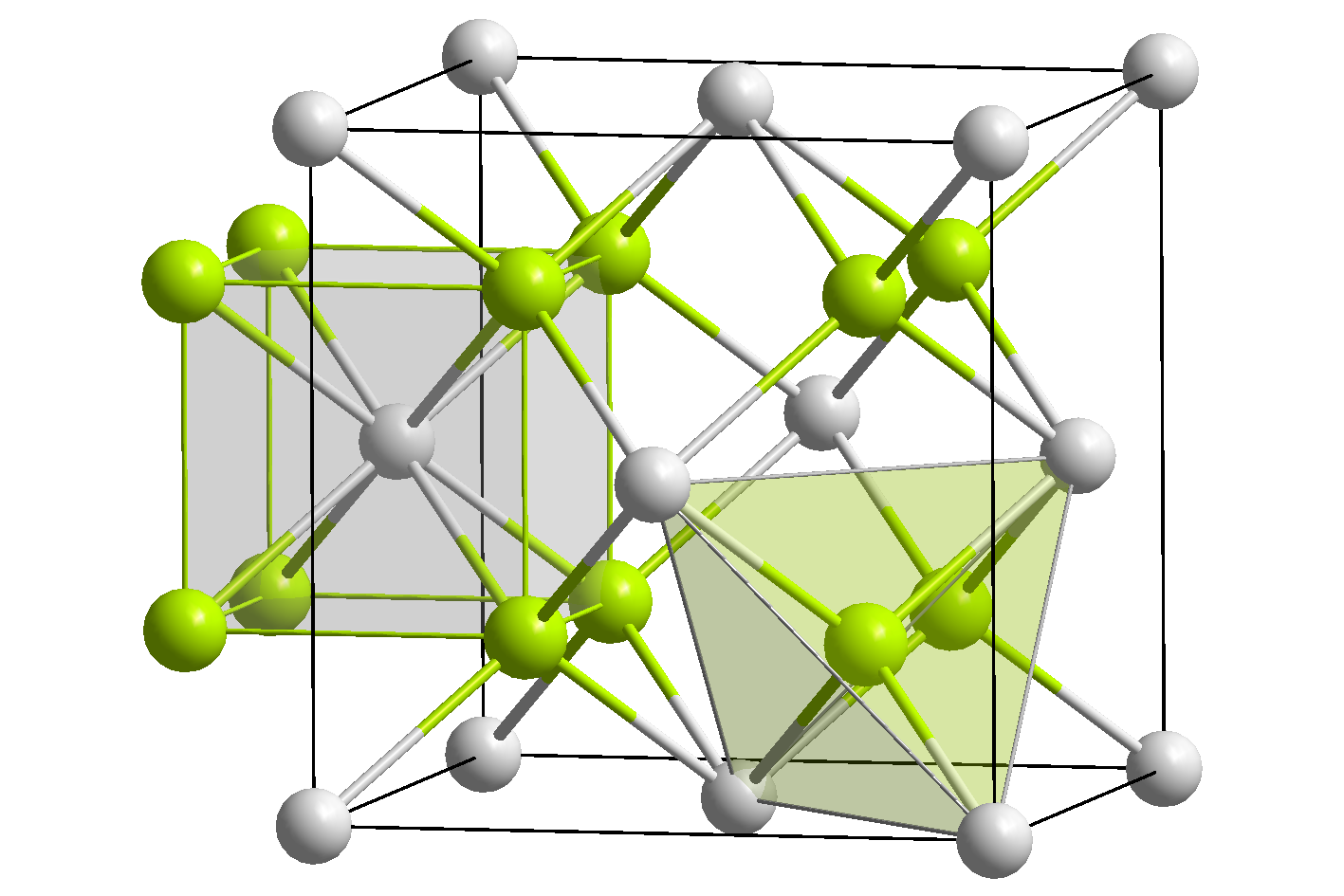
- Crystal form of californium oxyfluoride __ Cf^{3+} __ O^{2−} or F^{−}

Names
- IUPAC name Californium(III) oxyfluoride

Identifiers
CAS Number	22840-46-6
3D model (JSmol)	Interactive image
- InChI: InChI=1S/FH.O.Cf/h1H;;/q;-2;+3/p-1 Key: OFLICJBRZIYMIE-UHFFFAOYSA-M
- SMILES: [O-2].[F-].[Cf+3]

Properties
Chemical formula	CfFO
Molar mass	286 g·mol^{−1}

Structure
Crystal structure	cubic
Lattice constant	a = 556.1 ± 0.4 pm
- Except where otherwise noted, data are given for materials in their standard state (at 25 °C [77 °F], 100 kPa). Infobox references

Californium(III) oxyfluoride is a radioactive inorganic compound with a chemical formula CfOF, synthesized in the 1960s. This salt crystallizes with the cubic fluorite structure, with the oxide and fluoride anions randomly distributed in anion sites.

== Synthesis ==
Californium(III) oxyfluoride is an oxyfluoride and a mixed anion compound. It can be prepared by the hydrolysis of CfF_{3} at high temperature.
