= Californium(III) polyborate =

Names
- Other names Californium borate

Identifiers
3D model (JSmol)	Interactive image
CompTox Dashboard (EPA)	DTXSID001045144
- InChI: InChI=1S/B6H5O13.Cf/c7-1-13-2(8)16-6(12)18-4(10)14-3(9)17-5(11,15-1)19-6;/h7-9,11-12H;/q-3;+3 Key: DIULMIKRPOXUQF-UHFFFAOYSA-N
- SMILES: [Cf+3].O1B(O)OB(O)O[B-]2(O)O[B-]1(O)OB(O)OB([O-])O2

Properties
Chemical formula	Cf[B_{6}O_{8}(OH)_{5}]
Molar mass	526.90 g/mol
Appearance	pale green plates
Density	3.842 g/cm^{3}, solid

Structure
Crystal structure	monoclinic
Space group	C2/c
Lattice constant	a = 6.849 Å, b = 18.809 Å, c = 101.36 Å α = 90°, β = 124.72°, γ = 90°
Lattice volume (V)	910.9
Formula units (Z)	4
Coordination geometry	8 coordinate square antiprism
- Except where otherwise noted, data are given for materials in their standard state (at 25 °C [77 °F], 100 kPa). Infobox references

Californium polyborate is a covalent compound with formula Cf[B_{6}O_{8}(OH)_{5}]. In this compound the californium is in a +3 oxidation state. This compound is the highest atomic number borate with a visible solid phase. Heavier elements than californium decay too fast to make macroscopic amounts of solid crystals.

Californium polyborate is unusual in that californium is covalently bound to the borate. Californium was expected to resemble lanthanide elements in being highly ionic. The polyborate anion is polarisable and flexible. The 5f, 6d, 7s, and 7p orbitals of californium are all involved on the bonding. Most valence electrons are in the 5f orbital, and a significant fraction (2/3) in the 6d orbital, and smaller fractions of one electron are in the 7s and 7p orbitals.

== Formation ==
Californium(III) polyborate can be made by autoclaving a californium(III) chloride solution in water with excess boric acid for a week at 240 °C. This is then cooled slowly to room temperature for another three days. Water dissolves excess boric acid to leave insoluble crystals of the borate.

== Properties ==
The californium(III) polyborate solid undergoes a green fluorescence of 525 nm with ultraviolet light of wavelengths 365 or 420 nm. There is also an invisible near infrared fluorescence at 1020 nm induced by green light at 546 nm.

== Safety ==
Californium polyborate is dangerous because of the radioactivity of californium and its decay daughter curium. Between them these elements emit α particles, gamma rays and neutrons.
