= Californium(III) oxychloride =

Californium oxychloride

Names
- IUPAC name Californium oxychloride

Identifiers
CAS Number	20273-64-7
3D model (JSmol)	Interactive image
- InChI: InChI=1S/Cf.ClH.O/h;1H;/q+3;;-2/p-1 Key: XKTKIHYWYXTIDP-UHFFFAOYSA-M
- SMILES: [Cf+3].[Cl-].[O-2]

Properties
Chemical formula	CfClO
Molar mass	302 g·mol^{−1}
Appearance	pale green crystals

Related compounds
Related compounds	Einsteinium oxychloride Berkelium oxychloride
- Except where otherwise noted, data are given for materials in their standard state (at 25 °C [77 °F], 100 kPa). verify (what is ?) Infobox references

Californium oxychloride (CfOCl) is a radioactive salt first discovered in measurable quantities in 1960. It was the first californium compound ever isolated.

== Synthesis ==
Treatment of Cf_{2}O_{3} with moist hydrogen chloride or CfCl_{3} with water vapor.

== Crystal structure ==
Californium oxychloride exhibits a PbFCl-type crystal structure. Its lattice parameters are a = 3·956±0.002 Å and c = 6·662±0·009 Å.

== See also ==
- Californium compounds
- Californium
