= Einsteinium(III) bromide =

Names
- Other names: Einsteinium tribromide

Identifiers
CAS Number	72461-17-7; 57137-36-7 ^{253}Es
3D model (JSmol)	Interactive image
ChemSpider	64886013
PubChem CID	180573
- InChI: InChI=1S/3BrH.Es/h3*1H;/p-3 Key: FUNUGMODRSILHE-UHFFFAOYSA-K
- SMILES: [Br-].[Br-].[Br-].[Es]

Properties
Chemical formula	EsBr_{3}
Molar mass	490.8359 g/mol
Appearance	Light brown crystalline solid

Structure
Crystal structure	Monoclinic
Coordination geometry	Octahedral
Molecular shape	AlCl_{3} type

Related compounds
Other anions	Einsteinium(III) chloride Einsteinium(III) iodide
Related compounds	Einsteinium(II) bromide
- Except where otherwise noted, data are given for materials in their standard state (at 25 °C [77 °F], 100 kPa). Infobox references

Einsteinium(III) bromide (einsteinium tribromide) is the binary bromide salt of einsteinium. It has a monoclinic crystal structure and is used to create einsteinium(II) bromide. This compound slowly decays to californium(III) bromide. via alpha decay.
