= Neutron moisture gauge =

Scientific measuring instrument

A neutron moisture meter is a moisture meter utilizing neutron scattering. The meters are most frequently used to measure the water content in soil or rock. The technique is non-destructive, and is sensitive to moisture in the bulk of the target material, not just at the surface.

Water, due to its hydrogen content, is an effective neutron moderator, slowing high-energy neutrons. With a source of high-energy neutrons and a detector sensitive to low-energy neutrons (thermal neutrons), the detection rate will be governed by the water content of the soil between the source and the detector. The neutron source typically contains a small amount of a radionuclide. Sources may emit neutrons during spontaneous fission, as with californium; alternatively, an alpha emitter may be mixed with a light element for a nuclear reaction yielding excess neutrons, as with americium in a beryllium matrix.
