= Einsteinium(III) chloride =

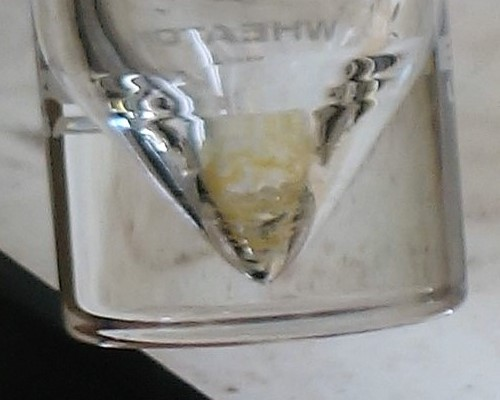

Names
- Other names: Einsteinium trichloride

Identifiers
CAS Number	24645-86-1; 55484-87-2 ^{253}Es
3D model (JSmol)	Interactive image
ChemSpider	64886613
PubChem CID	171449 (Charge error)
CompTox Dashboard (EPA)	DTXSID001336779
- InChI: InChI=1S/3ClH.Es/h3*1H;/q;;;+3/p-3 Key: OZEJMSZTICGSHJ-UHFFFAOYSA-K
- SMILES: [Cl-].[Cl-].[Cl-].[Es+3]

Properties
Chemical formula	EsCl_{3}
Molar mass	359.44 g/mol

Structure
Crystal structure	Hexagonal

Related compounds
Other anions	Einsteinium(III) bromide Einsteinium(III) iodide
- Except where otherwise noted, data are given for materials in their standard state (at 25 °C [77 °F], 100 kPa). Infobox references

Einsteinium(III) chloride is the chloride salt of einsteinium.

== Preparation ==
Einsteinium(III) chloride is created by reacting einsteinium metal with dry hydrogen chloride gas for 20 minutes at 500 °C which crystallized around 425 °C.

2 Es + 6 HCl → 2 EsCl_{3} + 3 H_{2}

== Chemical properties ==
The compound can be reduced by H_{2} to obtain EsCl_{2}.

2 EsCl_{3} + H_{2} → 2 EsCl_{2} + 2 HCl
