= Americium(II) chloride =

Names
- IUPAC name Americium(II) chloride
- Other names Dichloroamericium, americium dichloride

Identifiers
CAS Number	16601-54-0
3D model (JSmol)	Interactive image
ChemSpider	129558167
PubChem CID	15593905
- InChI: InChI=1S/Am.2ClH/h;2*1H/q+2;;/p-2 Key: ORMLYNFOLJPXLR-UHFFFAOYSA-L
- SMILES: Cl[Am]Cl

Properties
Chemical formula	AmCl_{2}
Molar mass	313.96 g/mol
Appearance	Black

Related compounds
Other anions	Americium(II) bromide Einsteinium(II) chloride
- Except where otherwise noted, data are given for materials in their standard state (at 25 °C [77 °F], 100 kPa). Infobox references

Americium(II) chloride, also known as dichloroamericium, is the chemical compound composed of americium and chloride with the formula AmCl_{2}.
