= Bulk material analyzer =

The term bulk material analyzer is the generic noun for that device which fits around a conveyor belt and conducts real-time elemental analysis of the material on the belt. Other names often found for such a device include belt analyzer, crossbelt analyzer and elemental analyzer. This product first found popularity in the cement industry during the 1990s, and today most new cement plants include at least one analyzer, if not two.

== Cement industry ==
A couple of applications predominate for the bulk material analyzer in cement production.

=== Stockpile management ===
One is known as "stockpile management," whereby an analyzer located upstream of the pile is able to track the cumulative chemistry of the pile. This allows the operator to direct haul trucks to different sections of the quarry in a way that will result in the final elemental composition of the pile close to target.

=== Raw mix proportioning ===
A second application in cement for the bulk material analyzer is raw mix proportioning. An analyzer placed just upstream of the raw mill can monitor the chemistry of the raw mix and automatically trigger an adjustment in the proportions of the reclaimed stockpile and the correctives. By doing so, the plant is able to reduce the variability in the raw mix, and later on the kiln feed. Consistent kiln feed chemistry in turn leads to lower fuel consumption per ton of clinker produced.

== Other applications ==
In the 2000s the application of the bulk material analyzer was extended to include minerals. Today, analyzers are found in copper, iron ore, and phosphates, to name a few. One of the advantages of these analyzers is the timeliness of information for the user. Another is the avoidance of physical sampling.

== Technology ==
The technology most frequently found in bulk material analysis and coal analysis are PFTNA (Pulsed Fast Thermal Neutron Activation), the prompt gamma neutron activation analysis (PGNAA) and Laser-induced breakdown spectroscopy (LIBS).

PFTNA and PGNAA technology rely on activation of the material on the conveyor belt by neutrons, and the instantaneous emission of gamma rays from nuclei which have absorbed neutrons. Capitalizing on the unique gamma ray spectrum associated with each element, the instrument can perform an analysis each minute on the composite spectrum to determine the overall elemental composition of the material.

LIBS operate by focusing the laser onto a small area at the surface of the material forming a plasma plume. When plasma quickly cools down the atomic emission lines of the elements can be observed using optical spectrometer. Based on obtained spectra quantitative chemical analysis of the sample is performed.
