= Californium(III) iodide =

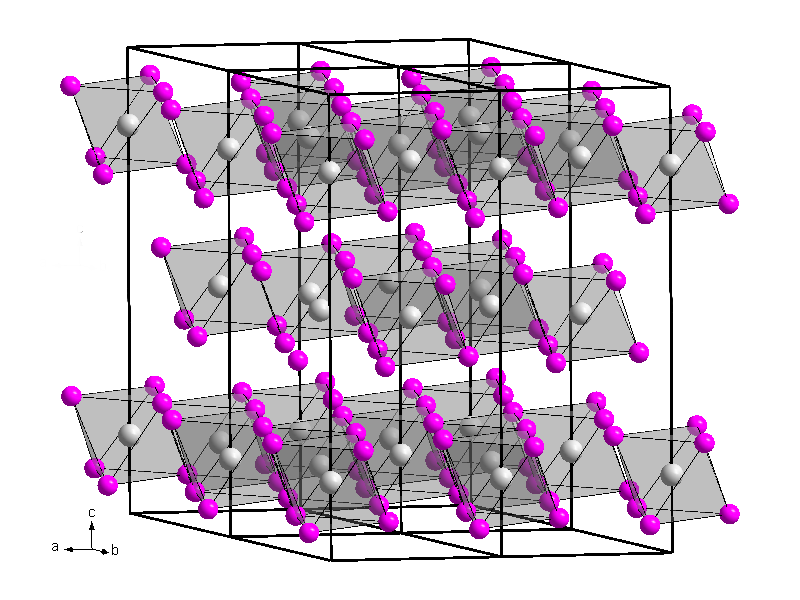

Names
- Other names Californium triiodide

Identifiers
CAS Number	20758-81-0
3D model (JSmol)	Interactive image
- InChI: InChI=1S/Cf.3HI/h;3*1H/q+3;;;/p-3 Key: SJKPTAUDVXCUTB-UHFFFAOYSA-K
- SMILES: [Cf+3].[I-].[I-].[I-]

Properties
Chemical formula	CfI_{3}
Molar mass	632 g·mol^{−1}
Appearance	red-orange solid
Density	g/cm^{3}
Boiling point	800 °C (1,470 °F; 1,070 K)
Solubility in water	insoluble

Structure
Crystal structure	trigonal

Related compounds
Related compounds	Einsteinium(III) iodide
- Except where otherwise noted, data are given for materials in their standard state (at 25 °C [77 °F], 100 kPa). Infobox references

Californium(III) iodide is a binary inorganic compound of californium and iodine with the formula CfI_{3}.

== Synthesis ==
Californium triiodide can be prepared in microgram quantities under high vacuum. It can be prepared at 500 °C from californium(III) hydroxide and hydrogen iodide:

Cf(OH)_{3} + 3HI → CfI_{3} + 3H_{2}O

== Physical properties ==
The compound forms a red-orange solid. The triiodide sublimes at ~800 °C without melting. It crystallizes in the trigonal crystal structure in the space group R3 (No. 148) with the lattice parameters a = 758.7 pm and c = 2081.4 pm with six formula units per unit cell. Its crystal structure is isotypic with that of bismuth(III) iodide.
