= Coal analyzer =

Coal analyzers are bulk material analyzers used by coal producers, coal preparation plants, and coal-fired power plants to determine coal quality in real time.

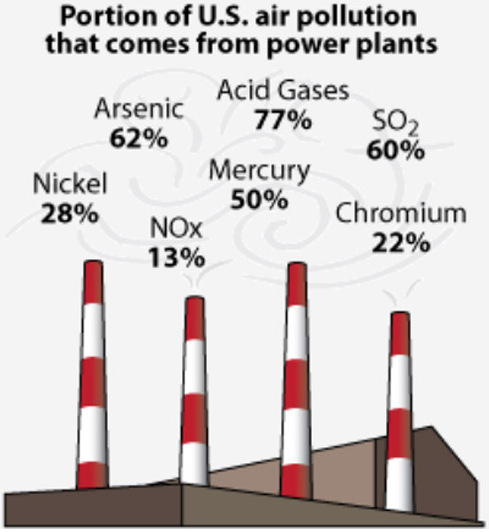
Portion of US air pollution that comes from power plants It is primarily in USA analyzers were the most used, in particular to reduce pollution from coal combustion

Coal quality parameters of greatest interest include ash, moisture, sulfur, and energy density (also known as heat content). Although most coal operations can obtain this information about coal quality by taking physical samples, preparing the samples, and analyzing them with laboratory equipment, these processes often involve a time lag of up to 24 hours from gathering the sample to final analysis results. In contrast, coal analyzers provide analysis information each minute on material being transported by conveyor either at the mine or the power plant. This timely coal quality information in turn allows the operator to improve his process by taking timely process control actions, such as sorting, blending, coal homogenization, or prep plant control.

There are several different types of coal analyzers. Some of the more sophisticated analyzers use prompt gamma neutron activation analysis (PGNAA) or pulsed fast thermal neutron activation (PFTNA) to determine the elemental content of the coal. Another emerging technology for elemental analysis is laser-induced breakdown spectroscopy (LIBS). PGNAA and LIBS enable analysis of sulfur and ash (the latter, by summing the ash constituents). When combined with a second type of analyzer, the moisture meter, they provide moisture and energy value as well. Moisture meters are often found in conjunction with the elemental analyzers, but sometimes are used alone, or in conjunction with ash gauges. Most moisture meters use microwave technology. The emerging technology of magnetic resonance (MR) offers a more direct measurement. Most ash gauges employ gamma attenuation principles.

Coal analyzers were first introduced in the early 1980s with the US and Australia leading the way. The demand for coal analyzers has been highest in the US, due to the need to control sulfur as mandated by the Clean Air Act Amendments of 1977. By 2005, more than 600 coal analyzers were in use throughout the world. Most of these analyzers are mounted around an existing conveyor belt, although a significant minority analyze sample streams taken from the main process stream.
