= Californium(III) chloride =

Names
- IUPAC name Californium(III) chloride

Identifiers
CAS Number	13536-90-8; ^{249}Cf: 89759-77-3
3D model (JSmol)	Interactive image
PubChem CID	^{249}Cf: 135990930
- InChI: InChI=1S/Cf.3ClH/h;3*1H/q+3;;;/p-3/i1-2;;; Key: SXTGCRCJBXYIFT-LBCWAVLQSA-K
- SMILES: [Cl-].[Cl-].[Cl-].[Cf+3]

Properties
Chemical formula	CfCl_{3}
Molar mass	357 g·mol^{−1}
Appearance	emerald-green solid

Structure
Crystal structure	hexagonal
- Except where otherwise noted, data are given for materials in their standard state (at 25 °C [77 °F], 100 kPa). Infobox references

Californium(III) chloride is an inorganic compound with a chemical formula CfCl_{3}. As in californium(III) oxide (Cf_{2}O_{3}) and other californium halides, including californium(III) fluoride (CfF_{3}) and iodide (CfI_{3}), the californium atom has an oxidation state of +3.

== Preparation ==
Californium(III) chloride can prepared by reacting californium(III) oxide with hydrogen chloride.

Cf_{2}O_{3} + 6 HCl → 2 CfCl_{3} + 3 H_{2}O

== Properties ==
=== Chemical properties ===
When heating californium(III) chloride until 500 °C, it can hydrolyse to produce californium oxychloride.

=== Physical properties ===
Californium(III) chloride is soluble in water, giving Cf^{3+} and Cl^{−} ions. This salt has an emerald-green color. Its crystal structure is hexagonal. It is strongly radioactive.

== See also ==
- Californium
- Californium compounds
