= Einsteinium(II) iodide =

Names
- Other names Einsteinium diiodide

Identifiers
| CAS Number | 70292-44-3 |
| 3D model (JSmol) | Interactive image |
| ChemSpider | 64878819 |
- InChI: InChI=1S/Es.2HI/h;2*1H/q+2;;/p-2 Key: FJSZVHQHPNHSPE-UHFFFAOYSA-L
- SMILES: [Es+2].[I-].[I-]

Properties
| Chemical formula | EsI_{2} |
| Molar mass | 506 g·mol^{−1} |
| Appearance | solid |

Related compounds
| Related compounds | Curium diiodide Americium diiodide |

Hazards
- Occupational safety and health (OHS/OSH)
| Main hazards | Radioactive |
- Except where otherwise noted, data are given for materials in their standard state (at 25 °C [77 °F], 100 kPa). Infobox references

Einsteinium(II) iodide is a binary inorganic chemical compound of einsteinium and iodide with the chemical formula EsI_{2}.

== Synthesis ==
The compound can be prepared via a reaction of EsI_{3} and H_{2}.

2 EsI_{3} + H_{2} → 2 EsI_{2} + 2 HI

== Physical properties ==
The compound forms a solid.
