= Einsteinium(II) bromide =

Names
- Other names Einsteinium dibromide

Identifiers
CAS Number	70292-43-2
3D model (JSmol)	Interactive image
- InChI: InChI=1S/2BrH.Es/h2*1H;/q;;+2/p-2 Key: HESZTJPABPXHCD-UHFFFAOYSA-L
- SMILES: [Es+2].[Br-].[Br-]

Properties
Chemical formula	Br_{2}Es
Molar mass	412 g·mol^{−1}

Related compounds
Related compounds	Curium dibromide Americium dibromide

Hazards
- Occupational safety and health (OHS/OSH)
Main hazards	Radioactive
- Except where otherwise noted, data are given for materials in their standard state (at 25 °C [77 °F], 100 kPa). Infobox references

Einsteinium(II) bromide is a binary inorganic chemical compound of einsteinium and bromine with the chemical formula EsBr_{2}.

== Synthesis ==
The compound can be prepared via a reduction of EsBr_{3} with H_{2}.

2 EsBr_{3} + H_{2} → 2 EsBr_{2} + 2 HBr
