= Einsteinium(III) oxide =

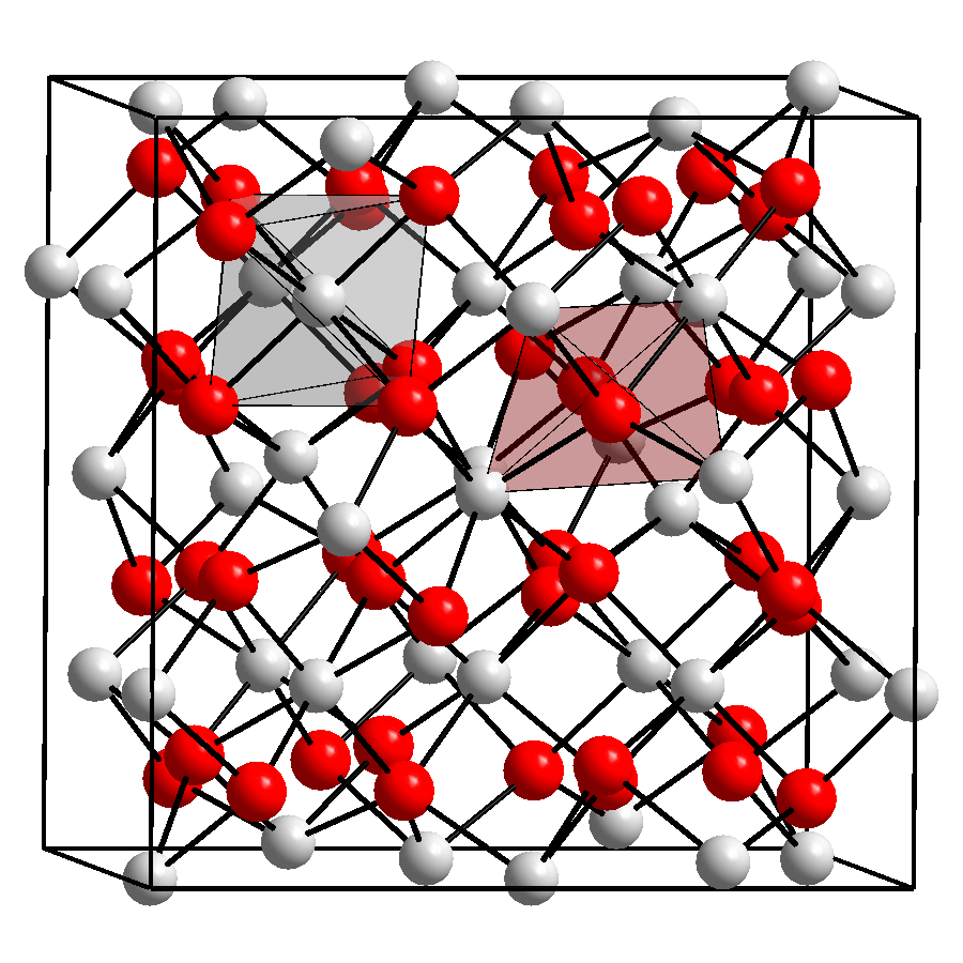
- __ Es^{3+} __ O^{2−}

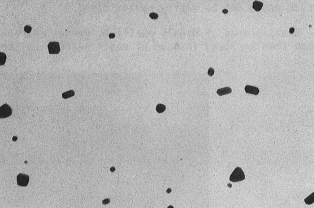

Names
- IUPAC names Einsteinium sesquioxide Dieinsteinium trioxide Einsteinium(III) oxide

Identifiers
CAS Number	37362-94-0
3D model (JSmol)	Interactive image
ChemSpider	154325 deprecated
PubChem CID	177221 charge imbalance
- InChI: InChI=1S/2Es.3O/q2*+3;3*-2 Key: DMBKIFBGDPVPRA-UHFFFAOYSA-N
- SMILES: [Es+3].[Es+3].[O-2].[O-2].[O-2]

Properties
Chemical formula	Es_{2}O_{3}
Molar mass	554 g/mol (^{253}Es)
Appearance	colourless solid

Structure
Crystal structure	Hexagonal
Space group	Ia3
Lattice constant	a = 370 pm, c = 600 pm
- Except where otherwise noted, data are given for materials in their standard state (at 25 °C [77 °F], 100 kPa). Infobox references

Einsteinium(III) oxide is an oxide of the synthetic actinide einsteinium which has the molecular formula Es_{2}O_{3}. It is a colourless solid.

Three modifications are known. The body-centered cubic form has lattice parameter a = 1076.6 ± 0.6 pm; this allows the ionic radius of the Es^{3+} ion to be calculated as 92.8 pm. The other two forms are monoclinic and hexagonal: the hexagonal form has the lanthanum(III) oxide structure.

Einsteinium(III) oxide can be obtained by annealing einsteinium(III) nitrate in sub-microgram quantities.

Einsteinium is a radioactive actinide with the atomic number 99. It formed after Ivy Mike detonation on 1952.
