= Einsteinium(II) chloride =

Names
- Other names Einsteinium dichloride, Dichloroeinsteinium

Identifiers
CAS Number	66693-95-6
3D model (JSmol)	Interactive image
ChemSpider	64878820
- InChI: InChI=1S/2ClH.Es/h2*1H;/q;;+2/p-2 Key: LELNFLMZNDMRHX-UHFFFAOYSA-L
- SMILES: [Es+2].[Cl-].[Cl-]

Properties
Chemical formula	Cl_{2}Es
Molar mass	323 g·mol^{−1}
Appearance	solid

Related compounds
Related compounds	Curium dichloride Americium dichloride Fermium dichloride
- Except where otherwise noted, data are given for materials in their standard state (at 25 °C [77 °F], 100 kPa). Infobox references

Einsteinium(II) chloride is a binary inorganic chemical compound of einsteinium and chlorine with the chemical formula EsCl_{2}.

== Synthesis ==
The compound can be prepared via a reaction of EsCl_{3} and H_{2}.

2 EsCl_{3} + H_{2} → 2 EsCl_{2} + 2 HCl

== Physical properties ==
The compound forms a solid.
