= Californium(III) fluoride =

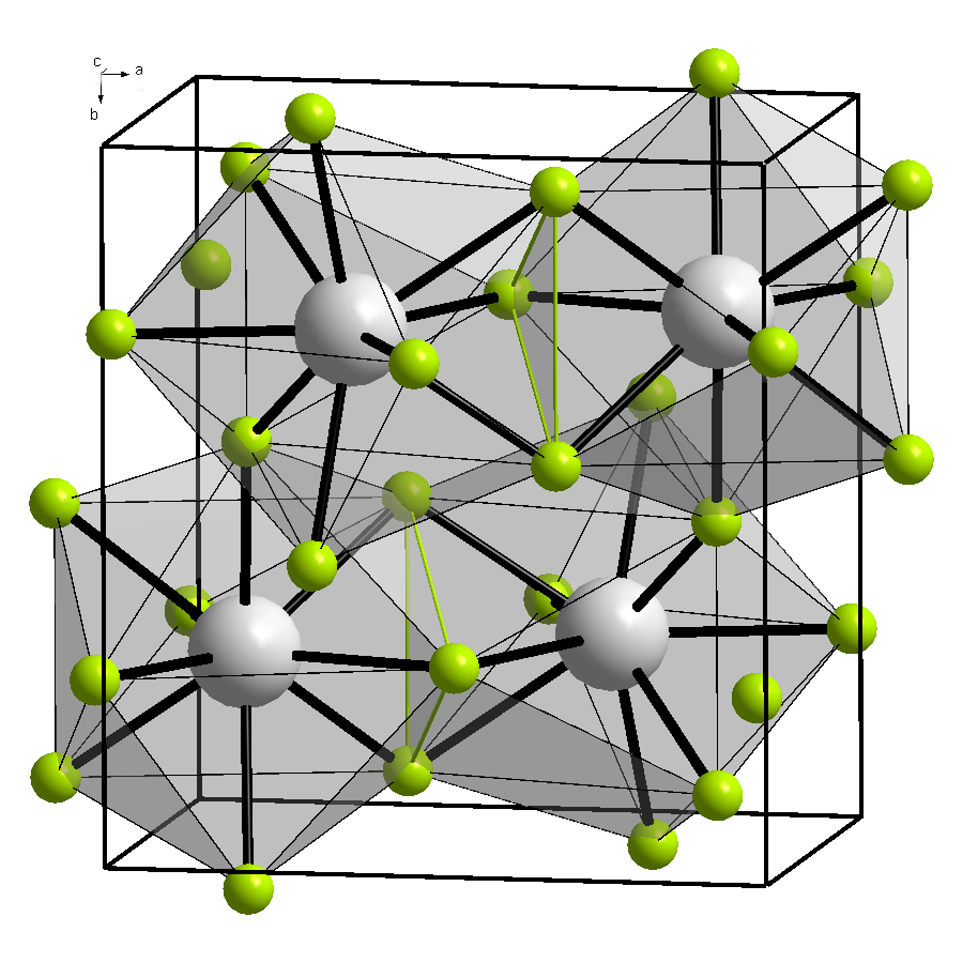

Names
- Other names Californium trifluoride

Identifiers
| CAS Number | 42775-52-0 |
| 3D model (JSmol) | Interactive image |
- InChI: InChI=1S/Cf.3FH/h;3*1H/q+3;;;/p-3 Key: RFYJBQZVUMTFMQ-UHFFFAOYSA-K
- SMILES: [Cf+3].[F-].[F-].[F-]

Properties
| Chemical formula | CfF_{3} |
| Molar mass | 308 g·mol^{−1} |
| Appearance | yellow-green solid |
| Density | g/cm^{3} |

Structure
| Crystal structure | orthorhombic |

Related compounds
| Related compounds | Berkelium trifluoride Einsteinium trifluoride |

Hazards
- Occupational safety and health (OHS/OSH)
| Main hazards | radioactive |
- Except where otherwise noted, data are given for materials in their standard state (at 25 °C [77 °F], 100 kPa). Infobox references

Californium(III) fluoride is a binary inorganic compound of californium and fluorine with the formula CfF_{3}

== Physical properties ==
Californium(III) fluoride is a yellow-green solid and has two crystalline structures that are temperature dependent. At low temperatures the orthorhombic structure (YF_{3} type) is found with lattice constants a = 665.3(3) pm, b = 703.9(1) pm and c = 439.3(3) pm. At higher temperatures it forms a trigonal system (LaF_{3} type) with: a = 694.5(3) pm and c = 710.1(2) pm. Here, each californium atom is surrounded by nine fluorine atoms in a distorted triply-capped trigonal-prismatic structure.
