= Einsteinium =

Einsteinium, _{99}Es
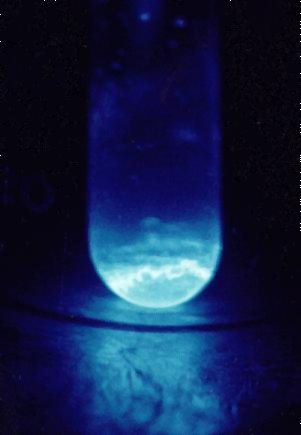
- A vial of solid einsteinium-253 glowing due to its own intense radiation

Einsteinium
- Pronunciation: /aɪnˈstaɪniəm/ (eyen-STY-nee-əm)
- Appearance: silvery; glows blue in the dark
- Mass number: [252]

Einsteinium in the periodic table
Hydrogen																															Helium
Lithium	Beryllium																									Boron	Carbon	Nitrogen	Oxygen	Fluorine	Neon
Sodium	Magnesium																									Aluminium	Silicon	Phosphorus	Sulfur	Chlorine	Argon
Potassium	Calcium															Scandium	Titanium	Vanadium	Chromium	Manganese	Iron	Cobalt	Nickel	Copper	Zinc	Gallium	Germanium	Arsenic	Selenium	Bromine	Krypton
Rubidium	Strontium															Yttrium	Zirconium	Niobium	Molybdenum	Technetium	Ruthenium	Rhodium	Palladium	Silver	Cadmium	Indium	Tin	Antimony	Tellurium	Iodine	Xenon
Caesium	Barium	Lanthanum	Cerium	Praseodymium	Neodymium	Promethium	Samarium	Europium	Gadolinium	Terbium	Dysprosium	Holmium	Erbium	Thulium	Ytterbium	Lutetium	Hafnium	Tantalum	Tungsten	Rhenium	Osmium	Iridium	Platinum	Gold	Mercury (element)	Thallium	Lead	Bismuth	Polonium	Astatine	Radon
Francium	Radium	Actinium	Thorium	Protactinium	Uranium	Neptunium	Plutonium	Americium	Curium	Berkelium	Californium	Einsteinium	Fermium	Mendelevium	Nobelium	Lawrencium	Rutherfordium	Dubnium	Seaborgium	Bohrium	Hassium	Meitnerium	Darmstadtium	Roentgenium	Copernicium	Nihonium	Flerovium	Moscovium	Livermorium	Tennessine	Oganesson
Ho
↑
Es
↓
(Utu)
californium ← einsteinium → fermium
- Atomic number (Z): 99
- Group: f-block groups (no number)
- Period: period 7
- Block: f-block
- Electron configuration: [Rn] 5f^{11} 7s^{2}
- Electrons per shell: 2, 8, 18, 32, 29, 8, 2

Physical properties
- Phase at STP: solid
- Melting point: 1133 K (860 °C, 1580 °F)
- Boiling point: 1269 K (996 °C, 1825 °F) (estimated)
- Density (near r.t.): 8.84 g/cm^{3}

Atomic properties
- Oxidation states: common: +3 +2, +4
- Electronegativity: Pauling scale: 1.3
- Ionization energies: 1st: 619 kJ/mol
- Covalent radius: 165 pm (single-bond)
- Van der Waals radius: 245 pm
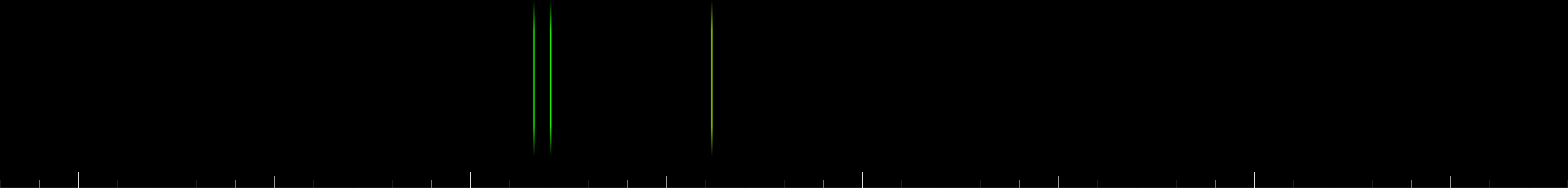
- Spectral lines of einsteinium

Other properties
- Natural occurrence: synthetic
- Crystal structure: face-centered cubic (fcc)
- Magnetic ordering: paramagnetic
- CAS Number: 7429-92-7

History
- Naming: after Albert Einstein
- Discovery: Lawrence Berkeley National Laboratory (1952)

Isotopes of einsteinium
Main isotopes			Decay	
Isotope	abundance	half-life (t_{1/2})	mode	product
^{252}Es	synth	471.7 d	α	^{248}Bk
^{252}Es	synth	471.7 d	ε	^{252}Cf
^{253}Es	synth	20.47 d	α	^{249}Bk
^{253}Es	synth	20.47 d	SF	–
^{254}Es	synth	275.7 d	α	^{250}Bk
^{254}Es	synth	275.7 d	β^{−}	^{254}Fm
^{255}Es	synth	39.8 d	β^{−}	^{255}Fm
^{255}Es	synth	39.8 d	α	^{251}Bk
^{255}Es	synth	39.8 d	SF	–

Einsteinium is a synthetic chemical element; it has symbol Es and atomic number 99 and is a member of the actinide series and the seventh transuranium element.

Einsteinium was discovered as a component of the debris of the first hydrogen bomb explosion in 1952. Its most common isotope, einsteinium-253 (^{253}Es; half-life 20.47 days), is produced artificially from decay of californium-253 in a few dedicated high-power nuclear reactors with a total yield on the order of one milligram per year. The reactor synthesis is followed by a complex process of separating einsteinium-253 from other actinides and products of their decay. Other isotopes are synthesized in various laboratories, but in much smaller amounts, by bombarding heavy actinide elements with light ions. Due to the small amounts of einsteinium produced and the short half-life of its most common isotope, there are no practical applications for it except basic scientific research. In particular, einsteinium was used to synthesize, for the first time, 17 atoms of the new element mendelevium in 1955.

Einsteinium is a soft, silvery, paramagnetic metal. Its chemistry is typical of the late actinides, with a preponderance of the +3 oxidation state; the +2 oxidation state is also accessible, especially in solids. The high radioactivity of ^{253}Es produces a visible glow and rapidly damages its crystalline metal lattice, with released heat of about 1,000 watts per gram. Studying its properties is difficult due to ^{253}Es's decay to berkelium-249 and then californium-249 at a rate of about 3% per day. The longest-lived isotope of einsteinium, ^{252}Es (half-life 471.7 days) would be more suitable for investigation of physical properties, but it has proven far more difficult to produce and is available only in minute quantities, not in bulk. Einsteinium is the element with the highest atomic number which has been observed in macroscopic quantities in its pure form as einsteinium-253.

Like all synthetic transuranium elements, isotopes of einsteinium are very radioactive and are considered highly dangerous to health on ingestion.

== History ==
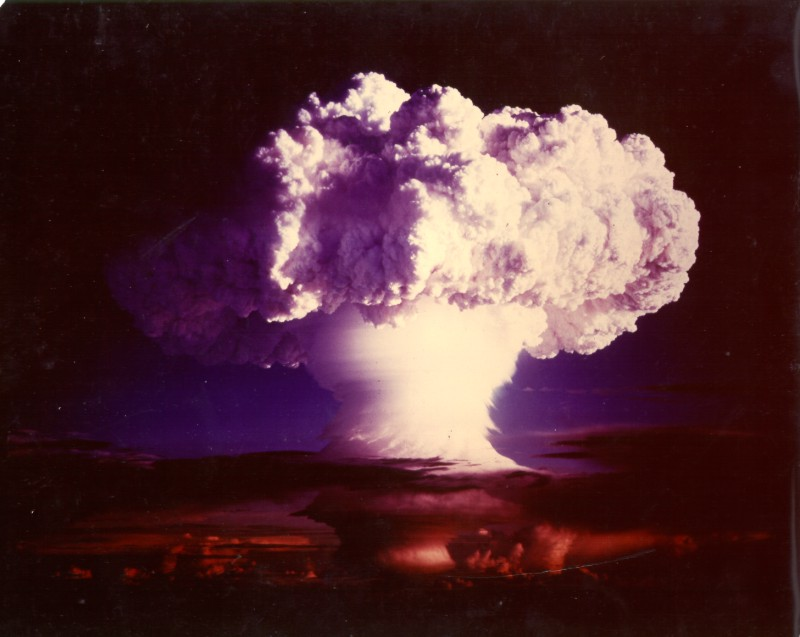
Einsteinium was first observed in the fallout from the Ivy Mike nuclear test.

Einsteinium was first identified in December 1952 by Albert Ghiorso and co-workers at University of California, Berkeley in collaboration with the Argonne and Los Alamos National Laboratories, in the fallout from the Ivy Mike nuclear test. The test was done on November 1, 1952, at Enewetak Atoll in the Pacific Ocean and was the first successful test of a thermonuclear weapon. Initial examination of the debris from the explosion had shown the production of a new isotope of plutonium, ^{244}Pu, which could only have formed by the absorption of six neutrons by a uranium-238 nucleus followed by two beta decays.

$$\ce{^{238}_{92}U ->[\ce{+ 6(n,\gamma)}][-2\ \beta^-]{} ^{244}_{94}Pu}$$

At the time, the multiple neutron absorption was thought to be an extremely rare process, but the identification of ^{244}Pu indicated that still more neutrons could have been captured by the uranium, producing new elements heavier than californium.

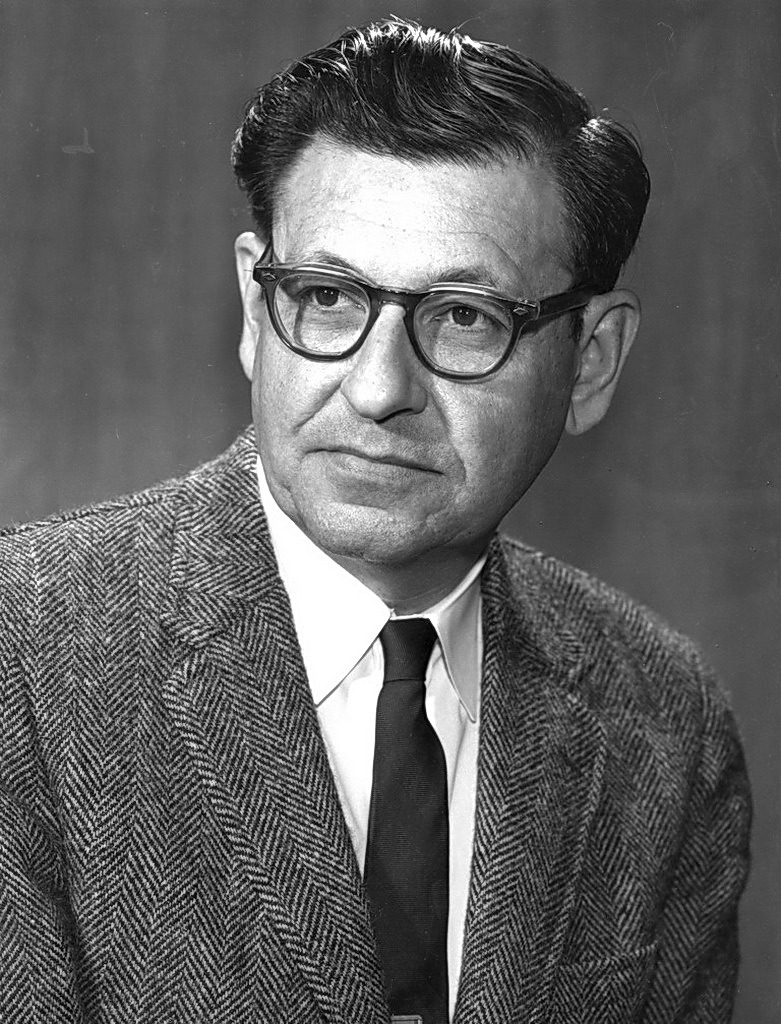
The element was discovered by a team headed by Albert Ghiorso.

Ghiorso and co-workers analyzed filter papers which had been flown through the explosion cloud on airplanes (the same sampling technique that had been used to discover ^{244}Pu). Larger amounts of radioactive material were later isolated from coral debris of the atoll, and these were delivered to the U.S. The separation of suspected new elements was carried out in the presence of a citric acid/ammonium buffer solution in a weakly acidic medium (pH ≈ 3.5), using ion exchange at elevated temperatures; fewer than 200 atoms of einsteinium were recovered in the end. Nevertheless, element 99, einsteinium, and in particular ^{253}Es, could be detected via its characteristic high-energy alpha decay at 6.6 MeV. It was produced by the capture of 15 neutrons by uranium-238 nuclei followed by seven beta decays, and had a half-life of 20.5 days. Such multiple neutron absorption was made possible by the high neutron flux density during the detonation, so that newly generated heavy isotopes had plenty of available neutrons to absorb before they could disintegrate into lighter elements. Neutron capture initially raised the mass number without changing the atomic number of the nuclide, and the concomitant beta-decays resulted in a gradual increase in the atomic number:

$$\ce{^{238}_{92}U ->[\ce{+15n}][6 \beta^-] ^{253}_{98}Cf ->[\beta^-] ^{253}_{99}Es}$$

Some ^{238}U atoms, however, could absorb two additional neutrons (for a total of 17), resulting in ^{255}Es, as well as in the ^{255}Fm isotope of another new element, fermium. The discovery of the new elements and the associated new data on multiple neutron capture were initially kept secret on the orders of the U.S. military until 1955 due to Cold War tensions and competition with Soviet Union in nuclear technologies. However, the rapid capture of so many neutrons would provide needed direct experimental confirmation of the r-process multi-neutron absorption needed to explain the cosmic nucleosynthesis (production) of certain heavy elements (heavier than nickel) in supernovas, before beta decay. Such a process is needed to explain the existence of many stable elements in the universe.

Meanwhile, isotopes of element 99 (as well as of new element 100, fermium) were produced in the Berkeley and Argonne laboratories, in a nuclear reaction between nitrogen-14 and uranium-238, and later by intense neutron irradiation of plutonium or californium:

$$\ce{^{252}_{98}Cf ->[\ce{(n,\gamma)}] ^{253}_{98}Cf ->[\beta^-][17.81 \ce{d}] ^{253}_{99}Es ->[\ce{(n,\gamma)}] ^{254}_{99}Es ->[\beta^-] ^{254}_{100}Fm}$$

These results were published in several articles in 1954 with the disclaimer that these were not the first studies that had been carried out on the elements. The Berkeley team also reported some results on the chemical properties of einsteinium and fermium. The Ivy Mike results were declassified and published in 1955.

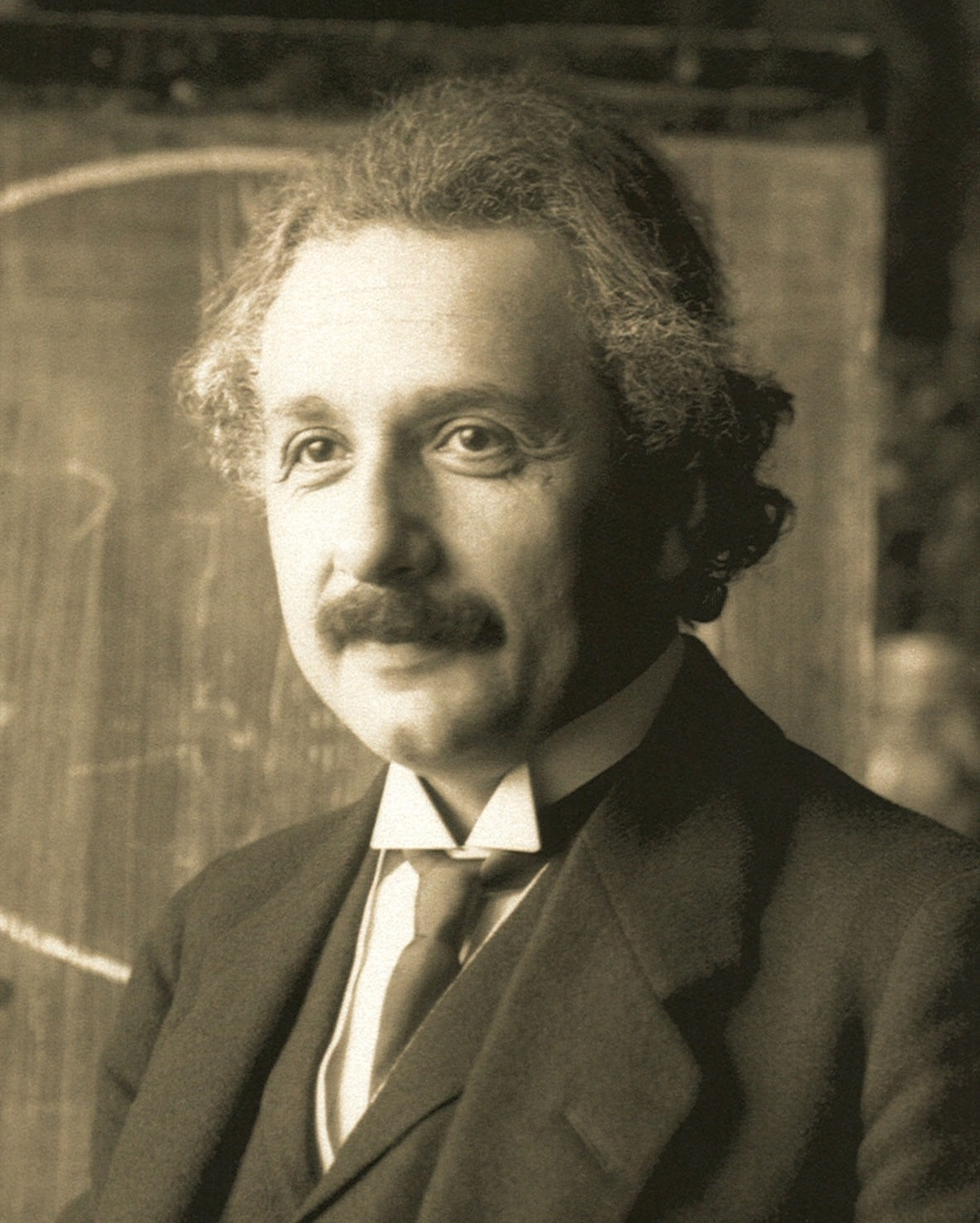
The element was named after Albert Einstein.

In their discovery of elements 99 and 100, the American teams had competed with a group at the Nobel Institute for Physics, Stockholm, Sweden. In late 1953 to early 1954, the Swedish group succeeded in synthesizing light isotopes of element 100, in particular ^{250}Fm, by bombarding uranium with oxygen nuclei. These results were also published in 1954. Nevertheless, the priority of the Berkeley team was generally recognized, as its publications preceded the Swedish article, and they were based on the previously undisclosed results of the 1952 thermonuclear explosion; thus the Berkeley team was given the privilege to name the new elements. As the effort which had led to the design of Ivy Mike was codenamed Project PANDA, element 99 had been jokingly nicknamed "Pandemonium" but the official names suggested by the Berkeley group derived from two prominent scientists, Einstein and Fermi: "We suggest for the name for the element with the atomic number 99, einsteinium (symbol E) after Albert Einstein and for the name for the element with atomic number 100, fermium (symbol Fm), after Enrico Fermi." Both Einstein and Fermi died between the time the names were originally proposed and when they were announced. The discovery of these new elements was announced by Albert Ghiorso at the first Geneva Atomic Conference held on 8–20 August 1955. The symbol for einsteinium was first given as "E" and later changed to "Es" by IUPAC.

== Characteristics ==
=== Physical ===
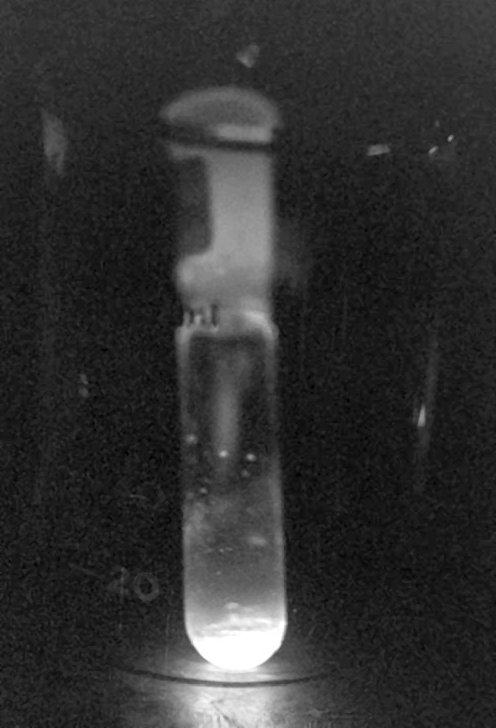
Glow due to the intense radiation from ~300 μg of ^{253}Es

Einsteinium is a synthetic, silvery, radioactive metal. In the periodic table, it is located to the right of the actinide californium, to the left of the actinide fermium and below the lanthanide holmium with which it shares many similarities in physical and chemical properties. Its density of 8.84 g/cm^{3} is lower than that of californium (15.1 g/cm^{3}) and is nearly the same as that of holmium (8.79 g/cm^{3}), despite einsteinium being much heavier per atom than holmium. Einsteinium's melting point (860 °C) is also relatively low—below californium (900 °C), fermium (1,527 °C) and holmium (1,461 °C). Einsteinium is a soft metal, with a bulk modulus of only 15 GPa, one of the lowest among non-alkali metals.

Unlike the lighter actinides californium, berkelium, curium and americium, which crystallize in a double hexagonal structure at ambient conditions; einsteinium is believed to have a face-centered cubic (fcc) symmetry with the space group Fm3̅m and the lattice constant a = 575 pm. However, there is a report of room-temperature hexagonal einsteinium metal with a = 398 pm and c = 650 pm, which converted to the fcc phase upon heating to 300 °C.

The self-damage induced by the radioactivity of einsteinium is so strong that it rapidly destroys the crystal lattice, and the energy release during this process, 1000 watts per gram of ^{253}Es, induces a visible glow. These processes may contribute to the relatively low density and melting point of einsteinium. Further, due to the small size of available samples, the melting point of einsteinium was often deduced by observing the sample being heated inside an electron microscope. Thus, surface effects in small samples could reduce the melting point.

The metal is trivalent and has a noticeably high volatility. In order to reduce the self-radiation damage, most measurements of solid einsteinium and its compounds are performed right after thermal annealing. Also, some compounds are studied under the atmosphere of the reductant gas, for example H_{2}O+HCl for EsOCl so that the sample is partly regrown during its decomposition.

Apart from the self-destruction of solid einsteinium and its compounds, other intrinsic difficulties in studying this element include scarcity—the most common ^{253}Es isotope is available only once or twice a year in sub-milligram amounts—and self-contamination due to rapid conversion of einsteinium to berkelium and then to californium at a rate of about 3.3% per day:

$$\ce{^{253}_{99}Es ->[\alpha][20 \ce{d}] ^{249}_{97}Bk ->[\beta^-][314 \ce{d}] ^{249}_{98}Cf}$$

Thus, most einsteinium samples are contaminated, and their intrinsic properties are often deduced by extrapolating back experimental data accumulated over time. Other experimental techniques to circumvent the contamination problem include selective optical excitation of einsteinium ions by a tunable laser, such as in studying its luminescence properties.

Magnetic properties have been studied for einsteinium metal, its oxide and fluoride. All three materials showed Curie–Weiss paramagnetic behavior from liquid helium to room temperature. The effective magnetic moments were deduced as 10.4±0.3 μ_{B} for Es_{2}O_{3} and 11.4±0.3 μ_{B} for the EsF_{3}, which are the highest values among actinides, and the corresponding Curie temperatures are 53 and 37 K.

=== Chemical ===
Like all actinides, einsteinium is rather reactive. Its trivalent oxidation state is most stable in solids and aqueous solution where it induces a pale pink color. The existence of divalent einsteinium is firmly established, especially in the solid phase; such +2 state is not observed in many other actinides, including protactinium, uranium, neptunium, plutonium, curium and berkelium. Einsteinium(II) compounds can be obtained, for example, by reducing einsteinium(III) with samarium(II) chloride.

=== Isotopes ===
Eighteen isotopes and four nuclear isomers are known for einsteinium, with mass numbers 240–257. All are radioactive; the most stable one, ^{252}Es, has half-life 471.7 days. The next most stable isotopes are ^{254}Es (half-life 275.7 days), ^{255}Es (39.8 days), and ^{253}Es (20.47 days). All the other isotopes have half-lives shorter than 40 hours, most shorter than 30 minutes. Of the five isomers, the most stable is ^{254m}Es with a half-life of 39.3 hours.

=== Nuclear fission ===
Einsteinium has a high rate of nuclear fission that results in a low critical mass. This mass is 9.89 kilograms for a bare sphere of ^{254}Es, and can be lowered to 2.9 kg by adding a 30-centimeter-thick steel neutron reflector, or even to 2.26 kg with a 20-cm-thick reflector made of water. However, even this small critical mass far exceeds the total amount of einsteinium isolated so far, especially of the rare ^{254}Es.

=== Natural occurrence ===
Due to the short half-life of all isotopes of einsteinium, any primordial einsteinium—that is, einsteinium that could have been present on Earth at its formation—has long since decayed. Synthesis of einsteinium from naturally occurring uranium and thorium in the Earth's crust requires multiple neutron capture, an extremely unlikely event. Therefore, all einsteinium on Earth is produced in laboratories, high-power nuclear reactors, or nuclear testing, and exists only within a few years from the time of the synthesis.

The transuranic elements up to fermium, including einsteinium, should have been present in the natural nuclear fission reactor at Oklo, but any quantities produced then would have long since decayed away.

The absorption spectrum of einsteinium has been detected in Przybylski's Star, along with other actinide elements.

== Synthesis and extraction ==
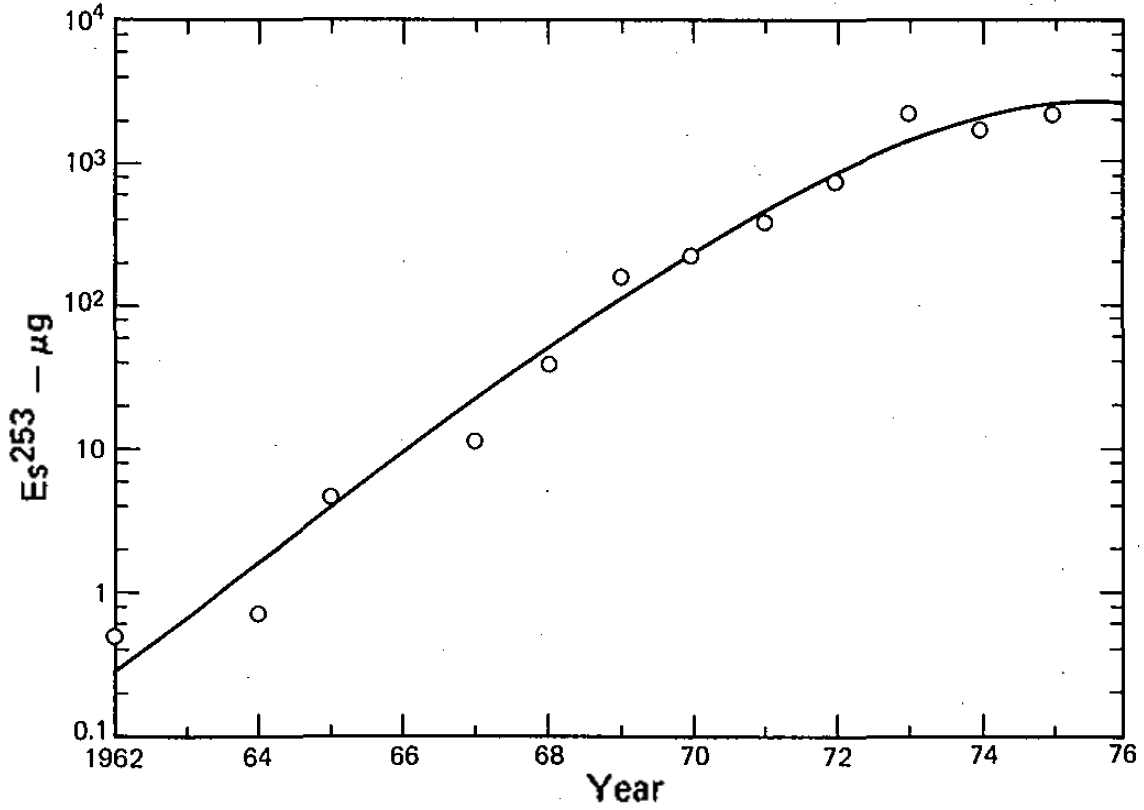
Early evolution of einsteinium production in the U.S.

Einsteinium is produced in minute quantities by bombarding lighter actinides with neutrons in dedicated high-flux nuclear reactors. The world's major irradiation sources are the 85-megawatt High Flux Isotope Reactor (HFIR) at Oak Ridge National Laboratory (ORNL), Tennessee, U.S., and the SM-2 loop reactor at the Research Institute of Atomic Reactors (NIIAR) in Dimitrovgrad, Russia, which are both dedicated to the production of transcurium (Z>96) elements. These facilities have similar power and flux levels, and are expected to have comparable production capacities for transcurium elements, though the quantities produced at NIIAR are not widely reported. In a "typical processing campaign" at ORNL, tens of grams of curium are irradiated to produce decigram quantities of californium, milligrams of berkelium (^{249}Bk) and einsteinium and picograms of fermium.

The first microscopic sample of ^{253}Es weighing about 10pr nanograms was prepared in 1961 at HFIR. A special magnetic balance was designed to estimate its weight. Larger batches were produced later starting from several kilograms of plutonium with the einsteinium yields (mostly ^{253}Es) of 0.48 milligram in 1967–1970, 3.2 milligrams in 1971–1973, followed by steady production of about 3 milligrams per year between 1974 and 1978. These quantities however refer to the integral amount in the target right after irradiation. Subsequent separation procedures reduced the amount of isotopically pure einsteinium roughly tenfold.

=== Laboratory synthesis ===
Heavy neutron irradiation of plutonium results in four major isotopes of einsteinium: ^{253}Es (α-emitter; half-life 20.47 days, spontaneous fission half-life 7×10^{5} years); ^{254m}Es (β-emitter, half-life 39.3 hours), ^{254}Es (α-emitter, half-life 276 days) and ^{255}Es (β-emitter, half-life 39.8 days). An alternative route involves bombardment of uranium-238 with high-intensity nitrogen or oxygen ion beams.

^{247}Es (half-life 4.55 min) was produced by irradiating ^{241}Am with carbon or ^{238}U with nitrogen ions. The latter reaction was first realized in 1967 in Dubna, Russia, and the involved scientists were awarded the Lenin Komsomol Prize.

^{248}Es was produced by irradiating ^{249}Cf with deuterium ions. It mainly β-decays to ^{248}Cf with a half-life of 25±5 minutes, but also releases 6.87-MeV α-particles; the ratio of β's to α-particles is about 400.

$$\ce{^{249}_{98}Cf + ^{2}_{1}H -> ^{248}_{99}Es + 3^{1}_{0}n} \quad \left( \ce{^{248}_{99}Es ->[\epsilon][27 \ce{min}] ^{248}_{98}Cf} \right)$$

^{249, 250, 251, 252}Es were obtained by bombarding ^{249}Bk with α-particles. One to four neutrons are released, so four different isotopes are formed in one reaction.

$$\ce{^{249}_{97}Bk ->[+\alpha] ^{249,250,251,252}_{99}Es}$$

^{253}Es was produced by irradiating a 0.1–0.2 milligram ^{252}Cf target with a thermal neutron flux of (2–5)×10^{14} neutrons/(cm^{2}·s) for 500–900 hours:

$$\ce{^{252}_{98}Cf ->[\ce{(n,\gamma)}] ^{253}_{98}Cf ->[\beta^-][17.81 \ce{d}] ^{253}_{99}Es}$$

In 2020, scientists at ORNL created about 200 nanograms of ^{254}Es; allowing some chemical properties of the element to be studied for the first time.

=== Synthesis in nuclear explosions ===
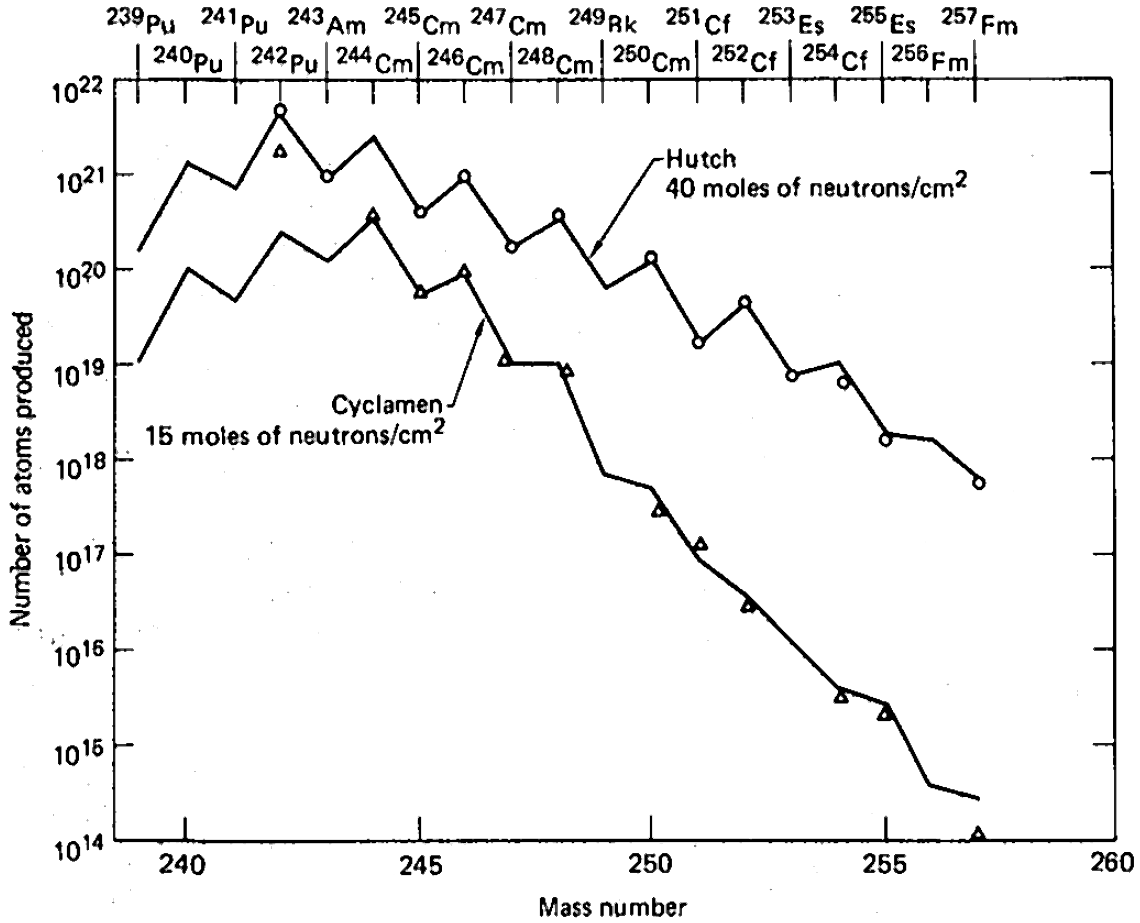
Estimated yield of transuranium elements in the U.S. nuclear tests Hutch and Cyclamen

The analysis of the debris at the 10-megaton Ivy Mike nuclear test was a part of long-term project. One of the goals was studying the efficiency of production of transuranic elements in high-power nuclear explosions. The motive for these experiments was that synthesis of such elements from uranium requires multiple neutron capture. The probability of such events increases with the neutron flux, and nuclear explosions are the most powerful man-made neutron sources, providing densities of the order 10^{23} neutrons/cm^{2} within a microsecond, or about 10^{29} neutrons/(cm^{2}·s). In comparison, the flux of HFIR is 5×10^{15} neutrons/(cm^{2}·s). A dedicated laboratory was set up right at Enewetak Atoll for preliminary analysis of debris, as some isotopes could have decayed by the time the debris samples reached the mainland U.S. The laboratory was receiving samples for analysis as soon as possible, from airplanes equipped with paper filters which flew over the atoll after the tests. Whereas it was hoped to discover new chemical elements heavier than fermium, none of these were found even after a series of megaton explosions conducted between 1954 and 1956 at the atoll.

The atmospheric results were supplemented by the underground test data accumulated in the 1960s at the Nevada Test Site, as it was hoped that powerful explosions in a confined space might give improved yields and heavier isotopes. Apart from traditional uranium charges, combinations of uranium with americium and thorium have been tried, as well as a mixed plutonium-neptunium charge, but they were less successful in terms of yield and was attributed to stronger losses of heavy isotopes due to enhanced fission rates in heavy-element charges. Product isolation was problematic as the explosions were spreading debris through melting and vaporizing the surrounding rocks at depths of 300–600 meters. Drilling to such depths to extract the products was both slow and inefficient in terms of collected volumes.

Of the nine underground tests between 1962 and 1969, the last one was the most powerful and had the highest yield of transuranics. Milligrams of einsteinium that would normally take a year of irradiation in a high-power reactor, were produced within a microsecond. However, the major practical problem of the entire proposal was collecting the radioactive debris dispersed by the powerful blast. Aircraft filters adsorbed only ~4×10^{−14} of the total amount, and collection of tons of corals at Enewetak Atoll increased this fraction by only two orders of magnitude. Extraction of about 500 kilograms of underground rocks 60 days after the Hutch explosion recovered only ~1×10^{−7} of the total charge. The amount of transuranic elements in this 500 kg batch was only 30 times higher than in a 0.4-kg rock picked up 7 days after the test which showed the highly non-linear dependence of the transuranics yield on the amount of retrieved radioactive rock. Shafts were drilled at the site before the test in order to accelerate sample collection after explosion, so that explosion would expel radioactive material from the epicenter through the shafts and to collecting volumes near the surface. This method was tried in two tests and instantly provided hundreds of kilograms of material, but with actinide concentration three times lower than in samples obtained after drilling. Whereas such method could have been efficient in scientific studies of short-lived isotopes, it could not improve the overall collection efficiency of the produced actinides.

Though no new elements (except einsteinium and fermium) could be detected in the nuclear test debris, and the total yields of transuranics were disappointingly low, these tests did provide significantly higher amounts of rare heavy isotopes than previously available in laboratories.

=== Separation ===
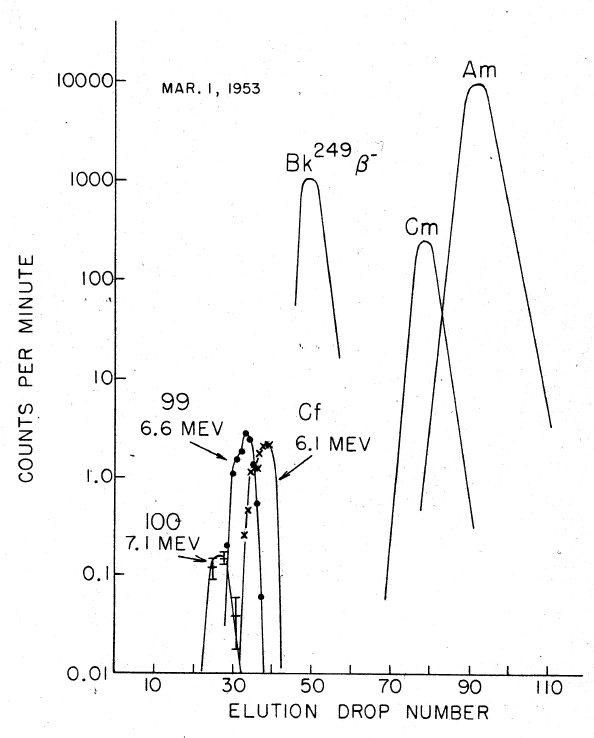
Elution curves: chromatographic separation of Fm(100), Es(99), Cf, Bk, Cm and Am

Separation procedure of einsteinium depends on the synthesis method. In the case of light-ion bombardment inside a cyclotron, the heavy ion target is attached to a thin foil, and the generated einsteinium is simply washed off the foil after the irradiation. However, the produced amounts in such experiments are relatively low. The yields are much higher for reactor irradiation, but there, the product is a mixture of various actinide isotopes, as well as lanthanides produced in the nuclear fission decays. In this case, isolation of einsteinium is a tedious procedure which involves several repeating steps of cation exchange, at elevated temperature and pressure, and chromatography. Separation from berkelium is important, because the most common einsteinium isotope produced in nuclear reactors, ^{253}Es, decays with a half-life of only 20 days to ^{249}Bk, which is fast on the timescale of most experiments. Such separation relies on the fact that berkelium easily oxidizes to the solid +4 state and precipitates, whereas other actinides, including einsteinium, remain in their +3 state in solutions.

Trivalent actinides can be separated from lanthanide fission products by a cation-exchange resin column using a 90% water/10% ethanol solution saturated with hydrochloric acid (HCl) as eluant. It is usually followed by anion-exchange chromatography using 6 molar HCl as eluant. A cation-exchange resin column (Dowex-50 exchange column) treated with ammonium salts is then used to separate fractions containing elements 99, 100 and 101. These elements can be then identified simply based on their elution position/time, using α-hydroxyisobutyrate solution (α-HIB), for example, as eluant.

The 3+ actinides can also be separated via solvent extraction chromatography, using bis-(2-ethylhexyl) phosphoric acid (abbreviated as HDEHP) as the stationary organic phase, and nitric acid as the mobile aqueous phase. The actinide elution sequence is reversed from that of the cation-exchange resin column. The einsteinium separated by this method has the advantage to be free of organic complexing agent, as compared to the separation using a resin column.

=== Preparation of the metal ===
Einsteinium is highly reactive, so strong reducing agents are required to obtain the pure metal from its compounds. This can be achieved by reduction of einsteinium(III) fluoride with metallic lithium:

EsF_{3} + 3 Li → Es + 3 LiF

However, owing to its low melting point and high rate of self-radiation damage, einsteinium has a higher vapor pressure than lithium fluoride. This makes this reduction reaction rather inefficient. It was tried in the early preparation attempts and quickly abandoned in favor of reduction of einsteinium(III) oxide with lanthanum metal:

Es_{2}O_{3} + 2 La → 2 Es + La_{2}O_{3}

== Chemical compounds ==
Crystal structure and lattice constants of some Es compounds
Compound	Color	Symmetry	Space group	No	Pearson symbol	a (pm)	b (pm)	c (pm)
Es_{2}O_{3}	Colorless	Cubic	Ia3̅	206	cI80	1076.6		
Es_{2}O_{3}	Colorless	Monoclinic	C2/m	12	mS30	1411	359	880
Es_{2}O_{3}	Colorless	Hexagonal	P3̅m1	164	hP5	370		600
EsF_{3}		Hexagonal						
EsF_{4}		Monoclinic	C2/c	15	mS60			
EsCl_{3}	Orange	Hexagonal	C6_{3}/m		hP8	727		410
EsBr_{3}	Yellow	Monoclinic	C2/m	12	mS16	727	1259	681
EsI_{3}	Amber	Hexagonal	R3̅	148	hR24	753		2084
EsOCl		Tetragonal	P4/nmm			394.8		670.2

=== Oxides ===
Einsteinium(III) oxide (Es_{2}O_{3}) was obtained by burning einsteinium(III) nitrate. It forms colorless cubic crystals, which were first characterized from microgram samples sized about 30 nanometers. Two other phases, monoclinic and hexagonal, are known for this oxide. The formation of a certain Es_{2}O_{3} phase depends on the preparation technique and sample history, and there is no clear phase diagram. Interconversions between the three phases can occur spontaneously, as a result of self-irradiation or self-heating. The hexagonal phase is isotypic with lanthanum oxide where the Es^{3+} ion is surrounded by a 6-coordinated group of O^{2−} ions.

=== Halides ===
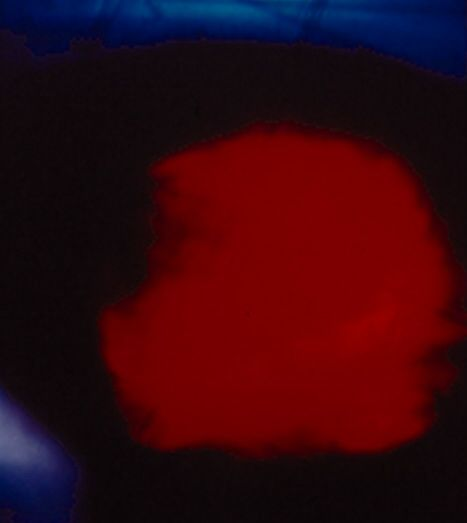
Einsteinium(III) iodide glowing in the dark

Einsteinium halides are known for the oxidation states +2 and +3. The most stable state is +3 for all halides from fluoride to iodide.

Einsteinium(III) fluoride (EsF_{3}) can be precipitated from Es(III) chloride solutions upon reaction with fluoride ions. An alternative preparation procedure is to exposure Es(III) oxide to chlorine trifluoride (ClF_{3}) or F_{2} gas at a pressure of 1–2 atmospheres and temperature 300–400°C. The EsF_{3} crystal structure is hexagonal, as in californium(III) fluoride (CfF_{3}) where the Es^{3+} ions are 8-fold coordinated by fluorine ions in a bicapped trigonal prism arrangement.

Es(III) chloride (EsCl_{3}) can be prepared by annealing Es(III) oxide in the atmosphere of dry hydrogen chloride vapors at about 500°C for some 20 minutes. It crystallizes upon cooling at about 425°C into an orange solid with a hexagonal structure of UCl_{3} type, where einsteinium atoms are 9-fold coordinated by chlorine atoms in a tricapped trigonal prism geometry. Einsteinium(III) bromide (EsBr_{3}) is a pale-yellow solid with a monoclinic structure of AlCl_{3} type, where the einsteinium atoms are octahedrally coordinated by bromine (coordination number 6).

The divalent compounds of einsteinium are obtained by reducing the trivalent halides with hydrogen:

2 EsX_{3} + H_{2} → 2 EsX_{2} + 2 HX; X = F, Cl, Br, I

Einsteinium(II) chloride (EsCl_{2}), einsteinium(II) bromide (EsBr_{2}) and einsteinium(II) iodide (EsI_{2}) have been produced and characterized by optical absorption, with no structural information available yet.

Known oxyhalides of einsteinium include EsOCl, EsOBr and EsOI. These salts are synthesized by treating a trihalide with a vapor mixture of water and the corresponding hydrogen halide: for example, EsCl_{3} + H_{2}O/HCl to obtain EsOCl.

=== Organoeinsteinium compounds ===
Einsteinium's high radioactivity has a potential use in radiation therapy, and organometallic complexes have been synthesized in order to deliver einsteinium to an appropriate organ in the body. Experiments have been performed on injecting einsteinium citrate (as well as fermium compounds) to dogs. Einsteinium(III) was also incorporated into β-diketone chelate complexes, since analogous complexes with lanthanides previously showed strongest UV-excited luminescence among metallorganic compounds. When preparing einsteinium complexes, the Es^{3+} ions were 1000 times diluted with Gd^{3+} ions. This allowed reducing the radiation damage so that the compounds did not disintegrate during the 20 minutes required for the measurements. The resulting luminescence from Es^{3+} was much too weak to be detected. This was explained by the unfavorable relative energies of the individual constituents of the compound that hindered efficient energy transfer from the chelate matrix to Es^{3+} ions. Similar conclusion was drawn for americium, berkelium and fermium.

Luminescence of Es^{3+} ions was however observed in inorganic hydrochloric acid solutions as well as in organic solution with di(2-ethylhexyl)orthophosphoric acid. It shows a broad peak at about 1064 nanometers (half-width about 100 nm) which can be resonantly excited by green light (ca. 495 nm wavelength). The luminescence has a lifetime of several microseconds and the quantum yield below 0.1%. The relatively high, compared to lanthanides, non-radiative decay rates in Es^{3+} were associated with the stronger interaction of f-electrons with the inner Es^{3+} electrons.

== Applications ==
There is almost no use for any isotope of einsteinium outside basic scientific research aiming at production of higher transuranium elements and superheavy elements.

In 1955, mendelevium was synthesized by irradiating a target consisting of about 10^{9} atoms of ^{253}Es in the 60-inch cyclotron at Berkeley Laboratory. The resulting ^{253}Es(α,n)^{256}Md reaction yielded 17 atoms of the new element with the atomic number of 101.

The rare isotope ^{254}Es is favored for production of superheavy elements due to its large mass, relatively long half-life of 270 days, and availability in significant amounts of several micrograms. Hence ^{254}Es was used as a target in the attempted synthesis of ununennium (element 119) in 1985 by bombarding it with calcium-48 ions at the superHILAC linear particle accelerator at Berkeley, California. No atoms were identified, setting an upper limit for the cross section of this reaction at 300 nanobarns.

$$\ce{{}^{254}_{99}Es + {}^{48}_{20}Ca -> {}^{302}_{119}Uue^\ast -> no\ atoms}$$

^{254}Es was used as the calibration marker in the chemical analysis spectrometer ("alpha-scattering surface analyzer") of the Surveyor 5 lunar probe. The large mass of this isotope reduced the spectral overlap between signals from the marker and the studied lighter elements of the lunar surface.

== Safety ==
Most of the available einsteinium toxicity data is from research on animals. Upon ingestion by rats, only ~0.01% of it ends in the bloodstream. From there, about 65% goes to the bones, where it would remain for ~50 years if not for its radioactive decay, not to speak of the three-year maximum lifespan of rats, 25% to the lungs (biological half-life ~20 years, though this is again rendered irrelevant by the short half-life of einsteinium), 0.035% to the testicles or 0.01% to the ovaries—where einsteinium stays indefinitely. About 10% of the ingested amount is excreted. The distribution of einsteinium over bone surfaces is uniform and is similar to that of plutonium.

== Bibliography ==
- Greenwood, Norman N.; Earnshaw, Alan (1997). Chemistry of the Elements (2nd ed.). Butterworth–Heinemann. ISBN 978-0080379418.
- Haire, Richard G. (2006). "Einsteinium". In Morss, Lester R.; Edelstein, Norman M.; Fuger, Jean (eds.). The Chemistry of the Actinide and Transactinide Elements (PDF). Vol. 3 (3rd ed.). Dordrecht, the Netherlands: Springer. pp. 1577–1620. doi:10.1007/1-4020-3598-5_12. ISBN 978-1-4020-3555-5. Archived from the original (PDF) on 2010-07-17.
- Holleman, Arnold F. & Wiberg, Nils (2007). Textbook of Inorganic Chemistry (102nd ed.). Berlin: de Gruyter. ISBN 978-3-11-017770-1.
- Seaborg, G.T., ed. (23 January 1978). Proceedings of the Symposium Commemorating the 25th Anniversary of Elements 99 and 100 (PDF). Report LBL-7701.
