= Einsteinium(III) iodide =

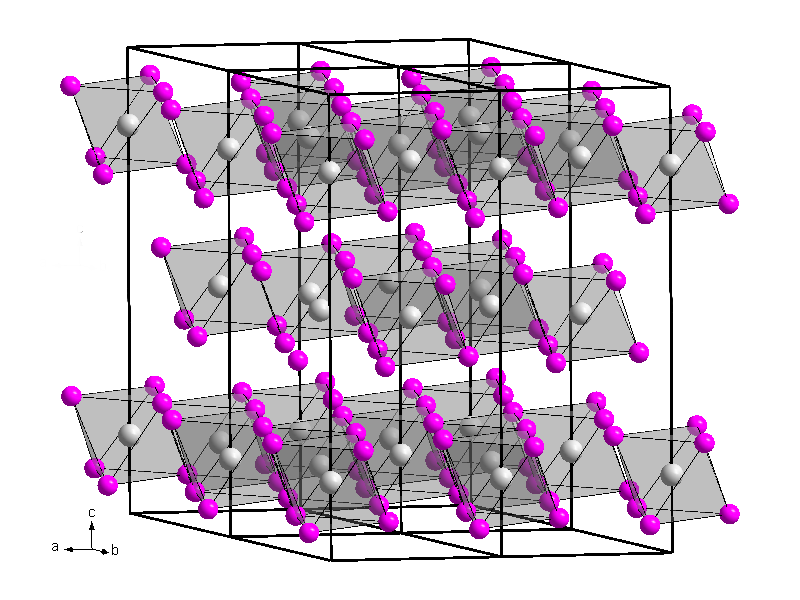
- __ Es^{3+} __ I^{−}

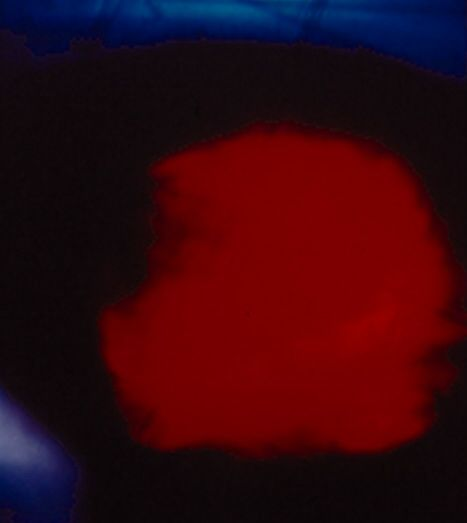

Names
- IUPAC names Einsteinium triiodide Einsteinium(III) iodide

Identifiers
CAS Number	99644-28-7
3D model (JSmol)	Interactive image
ChemSpider	65322231
CompTox Dashboard (EPA)	DTXSID001030498
- InChI: InChI=1S/Es.3HI/h;3*1H/q+3;;;/p-3 Key: HAHWYACNRLFPJX-UHFFFAOYSA-K
- SMILES: I[Es](I)I

Properties
Chemical formula	EsI_{3}
Molar mass	632.796 g/mol
Appearance	amber-coloured solid, glows red in the dark

Structure
Crystal structure	Hexagonal
Space group	R3̅
- Except where otherwise noted, data are given for materials in their standard state (at 25 °C [77 °F], 100 kPa). Infobox references

Einsteinium triiodide is an iodide of the synthetic actinide einsteinium which has the molecular formula EsI_{3}. This crystalline salt is an amber-coloured solid. It glows red in the dark due to einsteinium's intense radioactivity.

It crystallises in the hexagonal crystal system in the space group R3̅ with the lattice parameters a = 753 pm and c = 2084.5 pm with six formula units per unit cell. Its crystal structure is isotypic with that of bismuth(III) iodide.
