= March 1950 =

Month of 1950

<<	March 1950					>>
Su	Mo	Tu	We	Th	Fr	Sa
			1	2	3	4
5	6	7	8	9	10	11
12	13	14	15	16	17	18
19	20	21	22	23	24	25
26	27	28	29	30	31

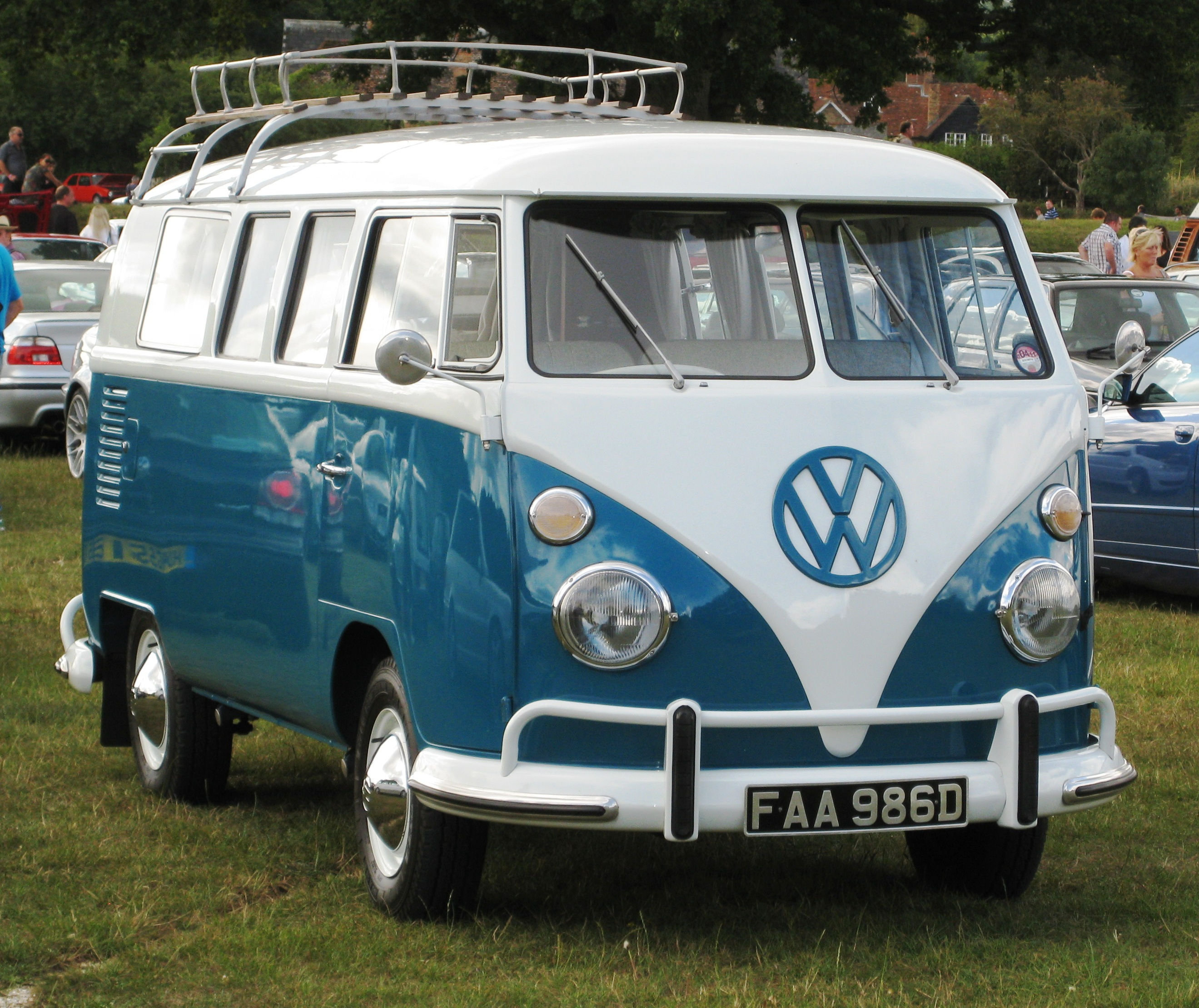
March 8, 1950: Volkswagen introduces the VW van

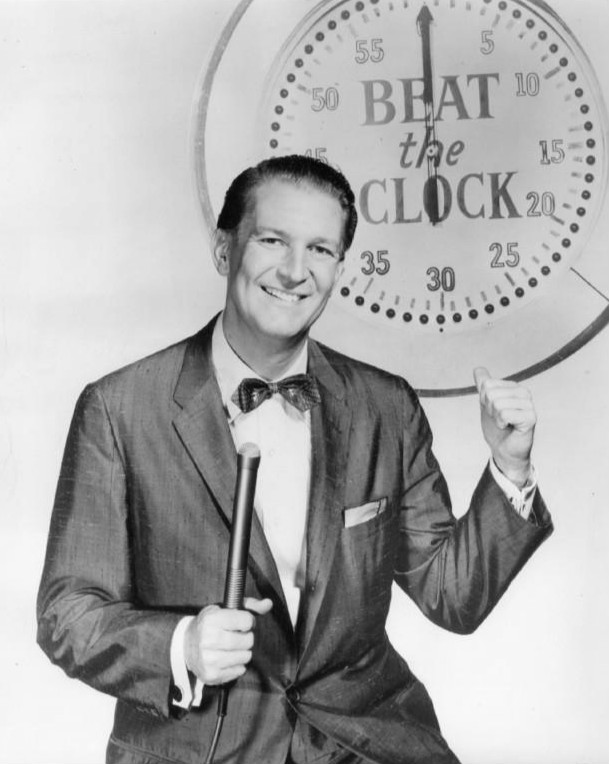
March 23, 1950: Beat the Clock premieres on TV

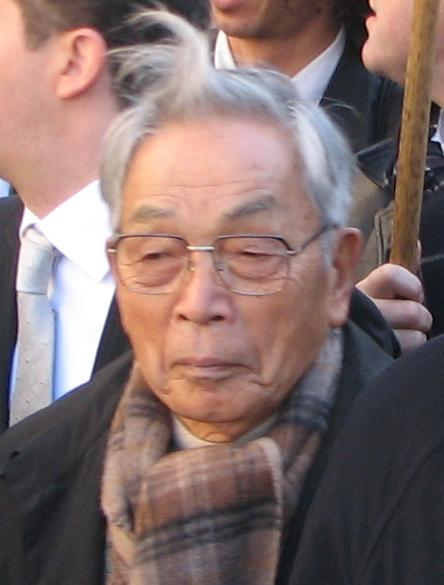
March 23, 1950: Sakae Menda begins 33 years on death row for a murder he didn't commit

The following events occurred in March 1950:

== March 1, 1950 (Wednesday) ==
- Klaus Fuchs was convicted of passing along American and British atomic secrets to the Soviet Union. After the 90 minute trial at the Old Bailey court in London, Fuchs was sentenced by Lord Chief Justice, Baron Goddard, to 14 years in prison.
- Acting Republic of China President Li Zongren ended his term in office, and Chiang Kai-shek resumed his duties as president after moving his government to the island of Taiwan.
- At 7:35 p.m. in Beatrice, Nebraska, a gas line explosion destroyed the West Side Baptist Church when the 12-member church choir was scheduled to practice. The church was empty, however, because every member of the choir happened to be running late. One member had taken a nap and overslept; another singer and her two daughters had car trouble; the church pastor and his wife had been detained by a problem at home; and none of the other six had even left the house.

== March 2, 1950 (Thursday) ==
- British Prime Minister Clement Attlee told his cabinet that he was temporarily halting the nationalization of British industry after opposition from the more conservative members of his Labour Party coalition.
- Tawfik Abu al-Huda resigned as Prime Minister of Jordan for reasons of health, but also because he did not want to "be party to a settlement with Israel.
- Born: Karen Carpenter, American singer and drummer; in New Haven, Connecticut (d. 1983)

== March 3, 1950 (Friday) ==
- The U.S. House of Representatives voted 186-146 in favor of statehood for Alaska. Although the bill would be approved by the Interior and Insular Affairs Committee of the U.S. Senate on June 29, the House resolutions in favor of statehood for Alaska and Hawaii would be blocked from ever coming to a Senate vote during the remainder of the 1949-1951 session.
- France signed a treaty with representatives of the Saar Protectorate on the border with West Germany, pledging a fully independent "Republic of Saarland" by 2000 in return for a fifty-year lease of the areas coal mines. The residents of the Saar would vote in 1955 in favor of reunification with Germany.
- Tanaka Kōtarō, a Roman Catholic jurist in a predominantly Buddhist and Shinto nation, was appointed Chief Justice of the Supreme Court of Japan. He served until 1960, when he became a jurist of the World Court.
- Born:
  - Francesco Nitto Palma, Italian Minister of Justice, in Rome
  - Isabella Bossi Ferdigotti, Italian journalist and novelist who won the Premio Campiello in 1991 for Di buona famiglia; in Rovereto.

== March 4, 1950 (Saturday) ==
- Mao Zedong and Zhou Enlai returned to the People's Republic of China after having been in the Soviet Union since December.
- The celebration, of the February 23 election of Northern Irish nationalist Cahir Healy to the United Kingdom's House of Commons, turned into a riot after supporters displayed the Republic of Ireland flag, in violation of U.K. law.
- Born: Rick Perry, Governor of Texas and 2012 candidate for Republican U.S. presidential nomination; in Paint Creek, Texas
- Died: Adam Rainer, 50, Austrian man who was the only person on record to have been both a dwarf (4 feet tall at age 18) and a giant (7'8" at the time of his death)

== March 5, 1950 (Sunday) ==
- Programming began for the first computerized weather forecast, with data from meteorologist Anthony Richardson being encoded into machine code for the ENIAC computer at Princeton University.
- The signing of a pact between United Mine Workers of America President John L. Lewis and coal operators ended a month-long strike by 370,000 bituminous coal miners
- The first postwar elections in Greece, since the end of the Greek Civil War, were held, with no party having more than 20 percent of the vote.
- In Rome, at the Aviator House, institution of the UIL (Unione Italiana del Lavoro), a syndicate gathering the social-democrat and republican workers, coming from the Federazione iltaliana lavoratori, and some “autonomist” (not pro-communist) socialists coming from the CGIL The new syndicate was sustained by the CIO and by center-left Italian politicians, as Ferruccio Parri; the socialist Italo Viglianesi was its first secretary.
- Died: Roman Shukhevych, 42, Ukrainian insurgent against the Soviet Union, was assassinated.

== March 6, 1950 (Monday) ==
- Iran extended diplomatic recognition to Israel.
- Died:
  - Albert Lebrun, 78, President of France 1932-1940
  - Harry Redfern, 88, British architect

== March 7, 1950 (Tuesday) ==
- The U.S. House of Representatives voted 261–110 in favor of granting statehood to Hawaii.
- Northwest Orient Airlines Flight 307 crashed into a home in Minneapolis, killing all 13 people on board and two children who had been sleeping in their beds.
- Former U.S. Justice Department employee Judith Coplon became the first American to be convicted of spying for the Soviet Union.
- Born: Franco Harris, American NFL player and Hall of Fame enshrinee; in Fort Dix, New Jersey (d. 2022)

== March 8, 1950 (Wednesday) ==
- The first Volkswagen van (also known as the Volkswagen Type 2 or the Microbus) rolled off the assembly line in Wolfsburg, Germany.
- The British government announced that it would not recognize Seretse Khama as the chief of the Bamangwato tribe in the African protectorate of Bechuanaland, primarily because of the controversy over his marriage to a white Englishwoman, Ruth Williams. When Bechuanaland became independent as Botswana in 1965, Khama would become its first President.
- The World Figure Skating Championships concluded in Wembley, England. Dick Button of the United States won the Men's event for the third year in a row while Alena Vrzáňová of Czechoslovakia won the Ladies' for the second straight year.

== March 9, 1950 (Thursday) ==
- Iraq enacted the Law of Denaturalization, giving its Jewish citizens one year to legally emigrate from Iraq on condition that they surrender their citizenship and never return. Ninety percent of the Jewish population, nearly 124,000 people, would decide to exercise the option and move to Israel.

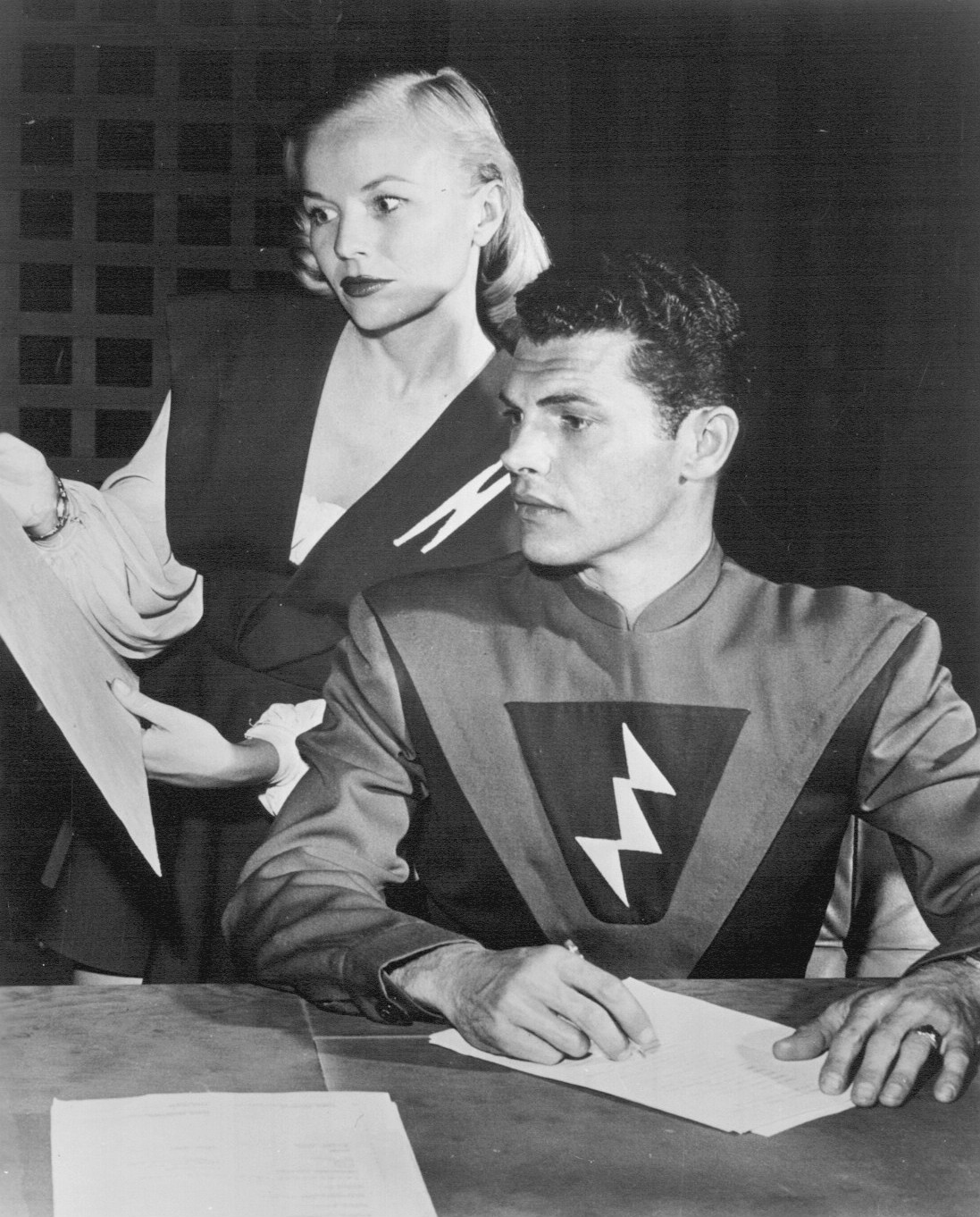
On patrol in 2950 A.D.

- The first successful American science fiction television show, Space Patrol began, as a 15-minute afternoon series about adventures in the 30th century, on a Los Angeles station KECA-TV (now KABC-TV). On December 30, it would be picked up nationally by the ABC Television network and run for four seasons.
- Robert Doisneau took the photo Le baiser de l'Hotel de Ville.
- Born: Danny Sullivan, American race car driver, 1985 Indianapolis 500 winner; in Louisville, Kentucky
- Died: Timothy Evans, 25, a Welsh van driver, was hanged after the November 30, 1949, murder of his wife and daughter. Later, it would be discovered that the chief prosecution witness, Evans's landlord John Christie, was a serial killer. Christie would be hanged for other crimes in 1953. Evans would receive a posthumous pardon from Queen Elizabeth II on October 18, 1966.

== March 10, 1950 (Friday) ==
- After considering the arguments of Edward Teller and John Archibald Wheeler that the Soviet Union would work on developing the hydrogen bomb even if the United States delayed, U.S. President Truman issued a secret Executive Order for immediate development of the thermonuclear weapons as "a matter of the highest urgency". Truman approved budgeting sufficient funds for research and for production of up to ten "H-bombs".
- Albert Schatz, who had been a student at Rutgers University, took the action of suing the university and his former professor, Dr. Selman Waksman. Schatz sought formal recognition as the co-discoverer of Streptomycin and for a share of royalties from the patent. On December 29, the case would be settled, with Schatz receiving acknowledgment, 3% of future royalties, and $125,000.
- Wolfgang Hedler, a West German Bundestag deputy and former Nazi who had recently been acquitted of trying to incite anti-Semitism, was ordered to leave the Parliament House at Bonn. On his way out, he was punched and kicked by ten of his fellow members of parliament.
- Died: Marguerite De La Motte, 47, American silent film actress and leading lady

== March 11, 1950 (Saturday) ==
- The Czechoslovakia men's national ice hockey team, defending world champions, was preparing to take a flight to London for the 1950 world championship tournament. At the airport, the police arrested the entire team except for one player, Vladimír Zábrodský, on charges that the athletes planned to defect while in London. Most of the national team players would remain imprisoned until October. Twelve were convicted of treason and given sentences ranging from 6 months to 15 years, with the star player, goalie Bohumil Modrý receiving the longest term.
- Deputy U.S. Undersecretary of State John Peurifoy challenged U.S. Senator Joe McCarthy to prove allegations that there were Communists employed in the U.S. Department of State. "I think that Senator McCarthy owes it to the country to make available... any evidence which he has that involves the loyalty of persons in the Department of State, whether it be the 205 that he said were Communists in Wheeling, the 57 that he said were card-carrying Communists in Salt Lake City, the four that he said weren't Communists at all in Reno, the 81 that he mentioned on the floor of the Senate, or just one," Peurifoy told reporters.
- In Sicily, police intervene to chase the laborers and unemployed occupying the uncultivated lands of the big landowners. During the month, the repression of the lands’ occupations and of the workers’ protests causes six dead in Italy.
- Born:
  - Jerry Zucker, American film director; in Milwaukee
  - Bobby McFerrin, American singer known for the song "Don't Worry, Be Happy"; in New York City
- Died:
  - Brock Pemberton, 64, American theatrical producer
  - Charles Windolph, 98, American Medal of Honor winner and last white survivor of the Battle of Little Bighorn

== March 12, 1950 (Sunday) ==
- All 80 people on a chartered flight were killed in the worst airline accident up to that time in history, when their Avro Tudor airplane crashed while attempting to land at the Llandow Airfield in Wales. There were only three survivors. The 78 passengers were rugby fans returning to Cardiff from Dublin, where Wales had won the United Kingdom rugby championship, 6–3, over Ireland.
- Voters in a referendum in Belgium, called the Royal question, approved the return of King Leopold III to resume the exercise of his constitutional powers, with 2,933,382 (57.7%) in favor of the monarch's return, and 2,151,881 (42.3%) against. The King had announced that he would abdicate unless he received at least 55 percent approval, and the final question was to be decided by Parliament, which extended him an invitation to return. King Leopold would return to Brussels on July 22, 1950, for the first time since World War II, proving to be so unpopular that he would annonce his abdication nine days later.
- Elections were held for the Supreme Soviet, the parliament for the Soviet Union. The 671 candidates for the Soviet of the Union (the upper house) and the 631 for the Soviet of Nationalities (the lower house) were all unopposed. Although most were Communist Party members, some were non-members who were designated as "non-party".
- Born: Javier Clemente, Spanish soccer football manager who managed the national teams of Spain (1992–98), Serbia (2006–07) and Cameroon (2010–11); in Barakaldo
- Died: Heinrich Mann, 78, German novelist; in Santa Monica, California

== March 13, 1950 (Monday) ==
- A wage system was introduced in most of the Soviet Union's forced labor camps after Communist Party approval of a request by the Soviet Ministry of Internal Affairs (MVD) to pay prisoners as an incentive for increased productivity.
- Representatives of the seven member nations of the Arab League signed a treaty for joint defense and economic co-operation.
- The Henri Martin affair began in the port city of Toulon in France when Henri Martin, a member of the French Communist Party (PCF) and the Toulon harbormaster, was arrested on charges of sabotage of the warship Dixmude and of sedition for distributing anti-war propaganda. Although Martin would be acquitted of sabotage charges, he would nevertheless be sentenced on October 19 to five years in prison for distributing leaflets; the public outcry over the disproportionate sentence for disagreement with the government would eventually lead to a presidential pardon and Martin's release on February 2, 1953.
- Syria's Prime Minister Khalid al-Azm announced his decision to dissolve the customs union between Syria and Lebanon.
- Indonesia devalued its currency by fifty percent. Under the new exchange rates, the worth of one American dollar went from 3.80 Indonesian rupiah to Rp 7.60 as a period of sustained inflation began. By the early 1970s, after further devaluations, $1.00 would be worth 415 "new" rupiahs, the equivalent of Rp 4,150,000 of the rupiahs of 1950.
- Born:
  - William H. Macy, American film actor; in Miami
  - David Bergman, American gay culture historian; in Fitchburg, Massachusetts
  - Robert Brandom, American philosopher; in New York City
- Died: Basil Garwood Lambert, 58, American vaudevillian whose routine as "Professor Lamberti" was to be "crazily playing the xylophone while a strip-teaser went through her act behind him, supposedly unknown to him".

== March 14, 1950 (Tuesday) ==
- Israel's Knesset passed the "Absentees' Property Law", which provided for the confiscation of the property owned by any of the 725,000 Palestinian residents who had fled from Israel and were "not physically within the state's borders"
- The FBI Ten Most Wanted Fugitives Program was introduced, with bank robber and murderer Thomas James Holden as the first person on the list. As of 2012, 497 persons had been listed, of which 456 had been located- 154 of whom had been arrested after ordinary citizens had recognized someone from the list.
- Snowmaking was successfully tested for the first time by inventors Wayne Pierce, Art Hunt and Dave Richey at Milford, Connecticut, operating on the principle of blowing water droplets through freezing air to create snow.
- The government of British Prime Minister Clement Attlee won its third consecutive vote of confidence, passing 308–289.
- Steingrimur Steinthorsson became the new Prime Minister of Iceland after his Progressive Party (the Framsóknarflokkurinn) and the Independence Party (Sjálfstaethsflokkurinn) were able to form a coalition government, which would hold power until 1956.

== March 15, 1950 (Wednesday) ==
- The Stockholm Peace Appeal was adopted at the second annual meeting of the World Peace Council, a group sponsored by the Communist Party of the Soviet Union, and called for "the absolute banning of the atomic weapon" and calling for "all people of goodwill throughout the world" to sign in agreement.
- The United States agreed to provide South Korea with $10,970,000 in military aid in order to deter a possible attack by North Korea. When the North Koreans invaded on June 25, 1950, "only a few hundred dollars worth of signal wire" had been delivered.
- The psychological thriller novel Strangers on a Train by Patricia Highsmith was published.
- In Italy, the first issue of Il Borghese (a right-wing non-conformist weekly magazine, ideated by Leo Longanesi), comes out.
- Died: Alice Stone Blackwell, 92, women's suffrage pioneer.

== March 16, 1950 (Thursday) ==
- The Girl Scouts organization, which had been founded on March 12, 1912 and then incorporated as "Girl Scouts, Inc" on June 10, 1915, was granted a federal charter by the United States Congress and reincorporated as "Girl Scouts of the USA".
- The British comic strip The Gambols was introduced, as a regular feature in the Daily Express. Cartoonist Barry Appleby and his wife, Dobs Appleby, wrote about a "middle-class, middle England" couple.
- The U.S. federal tax on yellow margarine (which was white before a food coloring was included) was repealed, effective July 1, as President Truman signed a bill to rescind legislation that had been in place since 1886. The tax had originally been enacted on the lobbying of the dairy industry, in order to discourage the sale of the competitor to butter. The result was to lower the price by 10 cents per pound. At the time, 16 of the states in the U.S. still outlawed the sale of colored margarine, and another six set their own taxes.

== March 17, 1950 (Friday) ==
- The synthesis of a new chemical element with 98 protons was announced by researchers at the radiation laboratory of the University of California. On February 9, 1950, Stanley Gerald Thompson, Kenneth Street Jr., Albert Ghiorso, and Glenn T. Seaborg had used the laboratory's cyclotron to create the sixth actinide element by bombarding curium (element 96) with alpha particles. In honor of the U.S. state of California and the university itself, the team named the element californium.

== March 18, 1950 (Saturday) ==
- The first public electronic music concert was performed, taking place at the École Normale de Musique de Paris.
- Inspiration for the "long ball" strategy of soccer football began when Charles Reep watched a match between Swindon Town F.C. and Bristol Rovers F.C., and decided to begin gathering and analyzing statistics about the relation between the number of passes made in a sequence, and the probability of a goal being scored.
- Belgian Prime Minister Gaston Eyskens and his cabinet resigned and the government collapsed after the ministers could not agree on holding a joint session of Parliament to decide whether to approve the results of the referendum returning King Leopold III from exile.
- Nationalist Chinese troops invaded the mainland and captured the coastal city of Sungmen from the People's Republic of China.
- Former engine factory foreman Nicolae Ceausescu, the protégé of Romanian General Secretary Gheorghe Gheorghiu-Dej, was made a Major General of the Romanian Army, despite having no prior military experience. Ceausescu would continue his rise to power and succeed Gheorghiu-Dej in 1965.
- "Music! Music! Music!" by Teresa Brewer topped the Billboard Best Sellers in Stores chart.
- Gino Bartali won the Milan-Sanremo for the fourth time. The 35-year old cyclist, after a fierce duel with his rival and friend, the favorite contender Fausto Coppi, crossed the finish line first with a sprint, closely followed by Nedo Logli and Oreste Conte.
- Born: Brad Dourif, American character actor; in Huntington, West Virginia

== March 19, 1950 (Sunday) ==
- Aja Vrzanova, the world champion in women's figure skating, defected from Czechoslovakia to the United Kingdom. Vrzanova had retained her title in a competition at Wembley on March 8, then went to the Home Office rather than to return to Prague.
- Died:
  - Edgar Rice Burroughs, 74, American author who created the Tarzan series in 1912
  - Walter Haworth, 67, British Nobel Prize in Chemistry laureate
  - Sigfús Blöndal, 75, Icelandic author

== March 20, 1950 (Monday) ==
- Poland's Sejm, at that time a unicameral legislature, unanimously passed a law requiring the nation's Roman Catholic churches, and all other religious associations, to transfer their property to government ownership. The purpose, according to the introduction, was "to remove the last remains of the landowner feudal privileges in the Church estates and to secure the material needs of the clergy". The church pastors were allowed to keep and operate their own private farms, and houses of worship and office buildings were exempt, but all other church-owned assets were confiscated.
- Two airline pilots radioed the air traffic control tower at Memphis to report that they had witnessed an unidentified object flying 1,000 feet above them and "traveling at a tremendous rate of speed". Jack Adams of the Chicago & Southern Air Lines and his co-pilot, G.W. Anderson, were flying passengers from Memphis to Shreveport and were over Stuttgart, Arkansas, when they spotted the craft, which Adams said had lighted windows "arranged in a perfect circular pattern", and was moving at more than 500 miles per hour. The NBC television network announced the next day that they had invited the two men to appear as guests on the show Today With Mrs. Roosevelt, hosted by former U.S. First Lady Eleanor Roosevelt.
- Born:
  - William Hurt, American film and TV actor; in Washington, DC (d. 2022)
  - Guido Bertolaso, director of the Italian Civil protection; in Rome.
- Died: Milton Steinberg, 46, American rabbi and theologian

== March 21, 1950 (Tuesday) ==
- Senator Joseph McCarthy told reporters that he had informed U.S. Senate investigators of "the name of the man — connected with the State Department — whom I consider the top Russian espionage agent in this country". McCarthy declined to give details, other than to say that he was "the boss of Alger Hiss, but Owen Lattimore was soon identified as the accused Communist.
- An all-white jury in Kosciusko, Mississippi, was unable to agree on the sentence for Leon Turner, a white ex-convict whom they had convicted of the January 8 murder of a four-year-old African-American girl, Ruby Nell Harris. The state prosecutor had asked for Turner to be given the death penalty, which the Associated Press noted was "rare punishment in Mississippi for a White man convicted of murdering a Negro". Because the jury could not agree on a death sentence, Turner was given life imprisonment. Turner, Windol Whitt and Malcolm Whitt had all been indicted for the murder of three black children, and Turner was identified as the man who shot Harris, 8-year-old Mary Burnside, and 12-year-old Frankie Thurman.
- Born: Roger Hodgson, English musician and singer-songwriter (Supertramp); in Portsmouth, Hampshire
- Died: Edward Murphy, 48, American gangster. Murphy, alias Emmet Kearns, was found shot to death on a farm near Hartsdale, Indiana, and was believed to have been given a "gangland execution" after attempting to expand the west Chicago territory of his gambling operations.

== March 22, 1950 (Wednesday) ==
- In a non-binding election, the Academic Senate of the University of California system voted 1,154 to 136 to abolish the loyalty oath, required by the Regents, for all professors. At the same time, the faculty voted 1,025-268 to endorse a general resolution against Communism. The 200-member board of regents declined to terminate the oath, but did extend the deadline for signing it by two months, and provided a means for an appeal for people fired for not signing.
- Born: Jocky Wilson, Scottish darts player, world champion in 1982 and 1989; in Kirkcaldy, Fife (d. 2012)

== March 23, 1950 (Thursday) ==
- Beat the Clock, an American television game show that required its contestants to accomplish various stunts within 60 seconds, was first telecast, appearing on the CBS network.
- The World Meteorological Organization (WMO) was created after the 30th nation had ratified the 1947 Convention on weather.
- Harry Gold became the second atomic research scientist to be arrested on charges of espionage for the Soviet Union, after being identified, by Klaus Fuchs, as the courier for transfer of papers to the Russians. Gold, no longer employed in U.S. atomic research, was working at the Philadelphia General Hospital at the time.
- Sophocles Venizelos formed a new government in Greece at the request of the King, reneging on an agreement made with Nikolaos Plastiras and George Papandreou, leaders of the other two center parties. Venizelos's party, despite having a plurality, had won less than 20 percent of the vote.
- Sakae Menda, a 24-year-old Japanese man, was wrongfully convicted of the 1948 murder of an elderly couple, and sentenced to death. Over the next 33 years, Menda would remain in solitary confinement on death row, filing six petitions for a new trial and the right to introduce new evidence because of his lack of legal assistance in his first trial. In 1979, Menda's sixth petition would be granted and he would be able to prove his alibi and get a witness to recant, and, in 1983, would become the first death row inmate to be exonerated and released from prison.
- Born: Alain Elkann, Italian writer and journalist; in New York City.

== March 24, 1950 (Friday) ==
- In the largest defection from behind the Iron Curtain up to that time, almost 90 people fled from Czechoslovakia after stealing three airplanes and flying to the United States Air Force base at Erding, West Germany.
- In an unprecedented honor for an American poet, the United States Senate unanimously approved a resolution honoring Robert Frost on his 75th birthday, noting, in part, that he had "given the American people a long series of stories and lyrics which are enjoyed, repeated, and thought about by people of all ages and callings".
- At the age of 15, Ginetta Gloria LaBianca became the youngest opera singer, appearing in a production of Rigoletto in the Italian city of Velletri, a record that still stood more than 60 years later.
- A peace treaty officially ended the Italian-Turkish war after 40 years.
- In Naples, the CISNAL (General Labour Union), a syndicate supporting the neo-fascist MSI, was constituted. Its first secretary was Giovanni Roberti.
- Born: Guglielmo Epifani, Italian trade union boss and General Secretary of the five million member Confederazione Generale Italiana del Lavoro from 2002 to 2010; in Rome (d. 2021)
- Died: James Rudolph Garfield, 84, former U.S. Secretary of the Interior, and son of U.S. President James A. Garfield.

== March 25, 1950 (Saturday) ==
- In South Korea, the Land Reform Law of 1950 was enacted, providing for a redistribution of farmland by the government. More than 1,500,000 households were eligible to buy land that had been confiscated from Japanese owners after the end of Korean rule by Japan, and land that had been purchased from landlords. Farmers could own a tract of land by giving the government one-third of their crops for three years. Tenant farming was outlawed, and household farms were limited to three hectares (7.4 acres).
- Senator Joe McCarthy identified a second U.S. State Department employee, after Owen Lattimore, whom he accused of being a security risk, naming Charles W. Thayer without accusing Thayer of being a Communist. Five days later, McCarthy would name John S. Service, Philip Jessup, and Haldore Hanson as additional questionable State Department employees.
- Died: Frank Buck, 66, American "collector of wild animals" and author of Bring 'Em Back Alive

== March 26, 1950 (Sunday) ==
- Voters in Yugoslavia's parliamentary elections gave a 95 percent approval for the candidates of the People's Front, the Communist party led by Josip Broz Tito. In accordance with the nation's traditional balloting, voters were given the choice of dropping a pink rubber pellet into one of two boxes representing "yes" or "no" for the party candidates.
- "Dolly", the 27-year-old elephant who was the star of the Ringling Brothers & Barnum and Bailey Circus, killed a five-year-old boy, Roger Schooley. He and his brother, both of Las Vegas, New Mexico, had been tossing peanuts to the elephant at the circus' winter quarters in Sarasota, Florida. When Roger ducked under the guard rope to pick up some peanuts off the ground, Dolly grabbed him with her trunk, threw him to the ground, then crushed his head with her foot.
- Owen Lattimore, a former U.S. State Department associate, was identified as the person whom Senator McCarthy had described on March 21 as "the top Russian espionage agent" in the United States.
- The Wall by John Hershey topped The New York Times Fiction Best Seller list.
- Born:
  - Teddy Pendergrass, American R & B singer and spinal cord injury advocate; in Philadelphia (d. 2010)
  - Martin Short, Canadian-born American comedian; in Hamilton, Ontario

== March 27, 1950 (Monday) ==
- U.S. Army Secretary Gordon Gray issued an order requiring the United States Army to open recruiting to all races, without a racial quota. Earlier in the month, Gray had personally asked U.S. President Harry S. Truman for the authority to return to the practice of limiting recruitment of African Americans to no more than 10 percent "if, as a result of a fair trial of this new system, there ensues a disproportionate balance of racial strengths in the Army".
- The Arab League (Egypt, Iraq, Jordan, Lebanon, Saudi Arabia, Syria and Yemen) unanimously passed a resolution declaring that "no member state of the Arab League shall negotiate with Israel with the view of concluding a separate peace or any other unilateral political, military, or economic agreement" on penalty of immediate expulsion from the League.
- Wallace Stevens won the second annual Bollingen Prize for Poetry. The designation of the prize winner was made by Yale University for the first time, after the previous year's committee controversially gave the award to Ezra Pound, who was under indictment for treason.
- Born: Tony Banks, English keyboardist (Genesis), in East Hoathly with Halland, East Sussex

== March 28, 1950 (Tuesday) ==
- The Beavers of City College of New York defeated the Bears of Bradley University, 71–68 to win the eight-team NCAA basketball championship. The game was a rematch of the National Invitational Tournament final ten days earlier, when CCNY defeated Bradley 69–61. Both tournament games were played at New York's Madison Square Garden. CCNY was also the only team to win both the NCAA and the NIT championships in the same year; CCNY remains the only NCAA Final Four winner that no longer plays at the Division I championship; it would cancel its basketball program after revelations of point shaving, eventually reorganizing a team that now plays in NCAA's Division III.
- Erwin Köhler, who had been fired as Mayor of Potsdam by the government of East Germany on March 2, was arrested along with his wife, Charlotte on charges of espionage and "anti-Soviet propaganda". Köhler was one of many purged politicians from East Germany's Christian Democratic Union party; he and his wife would be convicted on December 2, then executed in the Soviet Union the following April; Frank Schleusener, the CDU Mayor of Brandenburg, was arrested the following day, and his body was never found.
- Born:
  - Jeffrey Miller, Kent State University shooting victim; in Plainview, New York (d. 1970)
  - Claudio Lolli, Italian singer-songwriter; in Bologna (d. 2018)
- Died: Laurence A. Steinhardt, United States Ambassador to Canada and former Ambassador to the Soviet Union and to Czechoslovakia, was killed in the crash of a U.S. Air Force C-47 that was taking off from Ottawa.

== March 29, 1950 (Wednesday) ==
- The first public demonstration of the RCA system for color television, the all electronic tri-color picture tube, was made at a press conference in Washington, DC. The RCA system would eventually be accepted by the Federal Communications Commission, rather than a competing system designed by CBS, and would become the standard for broadcasting.
- Washington Post editorial cartoonist Herblock introduced the word "McCarthyism" in a cartoon showing the GOP Elephant asking "You mean I'm supposed to stand on that?".
- A mail train from Madrid to Málaga derailed on a set of points in Bobadilla station, killing 8 people and injuring 30.
- Born:
  - Catherine Bertini, Director of the United Nations World Food Programme; in Syracuse, New York
  - Dave McCurdy, American entrepreneur and former U.S. Congressman; in Canadian, Texas

== March 30, 1950 (Thursday) ==
- Kim Il Sung, the Communist leader of North Korea, arrived in Moscow to meet with Soviet Premier Joseph Stalin concerning the invasion of South Korea. Kim and his advisers told Stalin that a war with South Korea would be concluded "within a matter of days" and that the capital, Seoul, would quickly fall. The war would last more than three years.
- Nairobi, which had been established by British colonial authorities in 1899 as a town around a railway supply station, attained the status of a city, with a population of more than 120,000. The capital of Kenya now has more than 3,000,000 residents.
- The musical film The Daughter of Rosie O'Grady starring June Haver, Gordon MacRae and James Barton (as well as Debbie Reynolds in her first speaking role) premiered at Radio City Music Hall in New York.
- Born: Robbie Coltrane, Scottish-born actor and comedian, in Rutherglen, Lanarkshire (d. 2022)
- Died:
  - Léon Blum, 77, three-time Prime Minister of France
  - Joe Yule, 57, Scottish-born comedian and father of Mickey Rooney

== March 31, 1950 (Friday) ==
- Henry F. Grady, the U.S. Ambassador to Greece, made an unpopular intervention in the affairs of the Greek nation, releasing to the press a letter that he had written to newly appointed Prime Minister Venizelos. Not only did Ambassador Grady describe American concern for a "less than satisfactory performance of the Greek Government in its conduct of economic affairs", his published letter included the statement that the Greek government had "to decide whether or not they wish to continue to receive American aid". Venizelos resigned 15 days later.
- Voters in the resort town of Hot Springs, New Mexico, elected overwhelmingly (1,294 to 295) to change the town's name to that of the popular radio show Truth or Consequences, in response to a challenge by host Ralph Edwards. The town of more than 6,000 has been known as Truth or Consequences, New Mexico, ever since.
- Garuda Indonesia was established as a joint venture with KLM, the Netherlands national airline, and began with a fleet of 27 airplanes, a network of airports and a full schedule of flights. In 1954, Garuda would become a fully Indonesian business.
- The comedy-drama film Cheaper by the Dozen starring Clifton Webb, Jeanne Crain and Myrna Loy premiered in New York.
