= February 1950 =

Month of 1950

<<	February 1950					>>
Su	Mo	Tu	We	Th	Fr	Sa
			1	2	3	4
5	6	7	8	9	10	11
12	13	14	15	16	17	18
19	20	21	22	23	24	25
26	27	28

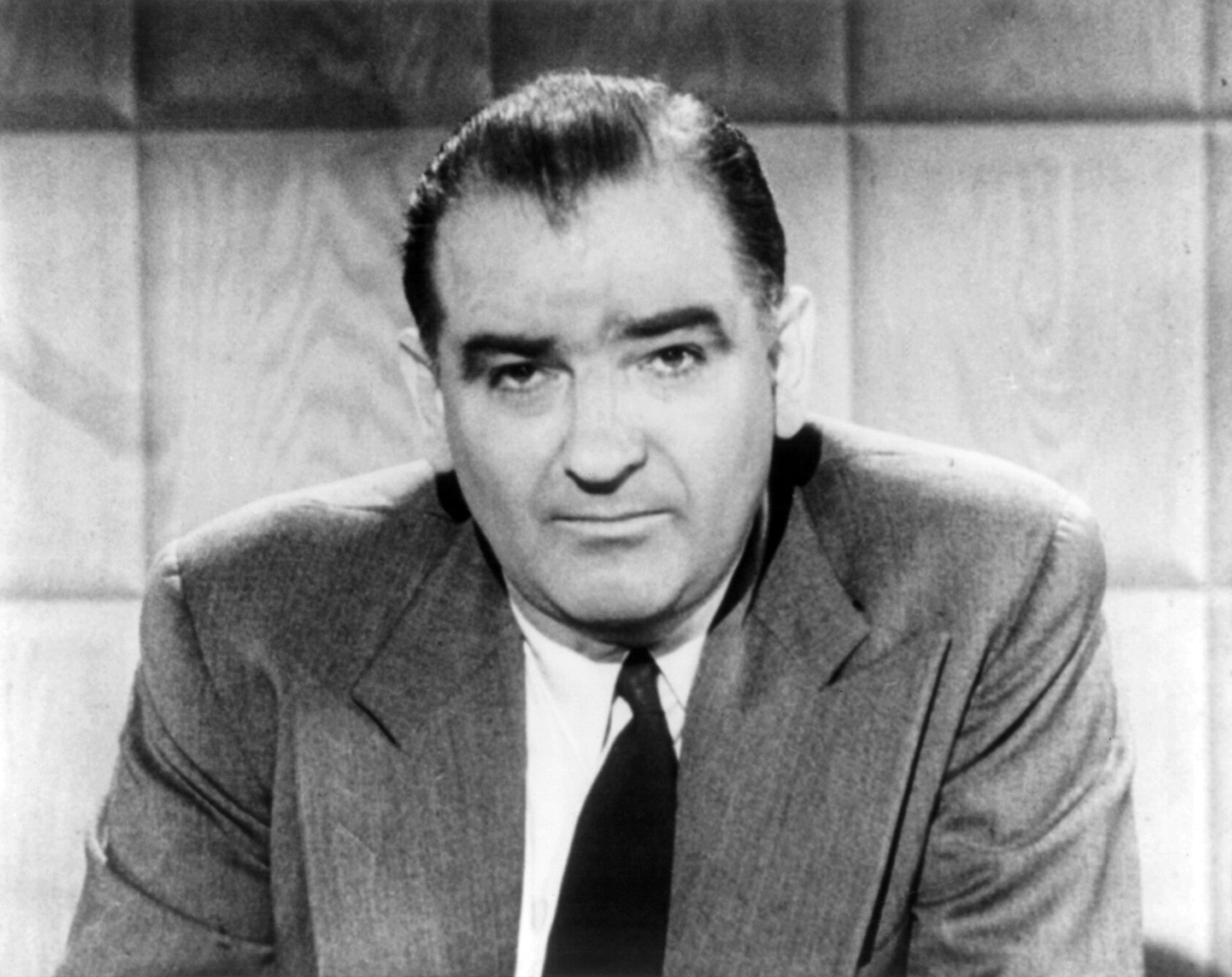
February 9, 1950: Senator McCarthy announces that he has a list of 205 names of Communist employees in the U.S. State Department

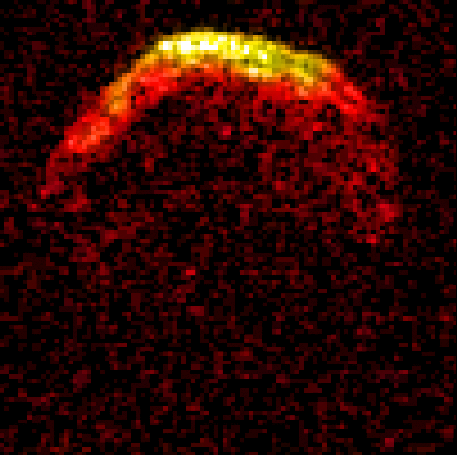
February 23, 1950: Asteroid 1950 DA discovered, 930 years before its possible impact with Earth

February 9, 1950: Element 98, first synthesized, dubbed Californium

The following events occurred in February 1950:

== February 1, 1950 (Wednesday) ==
- U.S. President Harry S. Truman issued Executive Order 10104, adding another level of nondisclosure to United States government information. The first three levels ("restricted", "confidential" and "secret") were kept, but an even higher classification — "top secret" — was used for the first time.
- The United States Senate voted 64–27 in favor of a proposed amendment to the United States Constitution that would change the method of selecting the Electoral College. Under the proposal, which received the required 2/3rds majority, a state's electoral votes would be divided in proportion to the percentage of the popular vote that a presidential candidate received, rather than the winner in an individual receiving all of the electoral votes in that state. The "Lodge-Gossett" bill failed a few months later to get approval in the U.S. House of Representatives.

== February 2, 1950 (Thursday) ==
- The French Assembly approved the Saigon Convention, granting sovereignty and promising eventual independence to the State of Vietnam, under the leadership of former Emperor Bao Dai.
- The game show What's My Line? began a 17-year run on the CBS television network, and would continue until September 3, 1967.
- Died: Constantin Carathéodory, 74, Greek mathematician

== February 3, 1950 (Friday) ==
- Nuclear physicist Klaus Fuchs was arrested by agents of Scotland Yard and charged with having provided American atomic bomb secrets to the Soviet Union.
- Born:
  - Morgan Fairchild (stage name for Patsy Ann McClenny), American actress known for the TV series Falcon Crest; in Dallas
  - Zaynab Alkali, Nigerian novelist; in Biu
- Died:
  - Sir Lionel Cripps, 86, Rhodesian politician and the first Speaker of Rhodesia's colonial legislative assembly
  - Sid Field, 45, British comedian, died of a heart attack.
  - Émile Borel, 85, French mathematician

== February 4, 1950 (Saturday) ==
- U.S. Army Lieutenant General Leslie R. Groves testified in a closed hearing before a joint congressional committee in Washington that, as a result of the secrets that Dr. Klaus Fuchs had provided to the U.S.S.R., the Soviet Union had not only begun development of an atomic bomb arsenal, but that the U.S. was in a race against the Soviets on the development of the hydrogen bomb.
- Died: Montagu Collet Norman, 78, British financier, Governor of the Bank of England 1920–1944, nicknamed "The Sphinx of Threadneedle Street".

== February 5, 1950 (Sunday) ==
- The Soviet Union and the People's Republic of China signed a treaty in Moscow, for the return of the Port Arthur naval base territory to Chinese control. Located in Manchuria, Port Arthur had been under Russian control until 1905, when it was captured by Japan in the Russo-Japanese War and renamed Ryojun. The U.S.S.R. recaptured the port in 1945 during World War II, and it would finally be turned over to China in 1955.
- Totocalcio, the football pool for betting on soccer football matches in Italy, had its first big winner, when a miner from Sardinia, Giovanni Mannu, won 77,000,000 Italian lire for predicting all 12 of that weekend's matches correctly. The amount, worth $123,000 American at the time, would be equivalent to $1.1 million (or €850,000) in 2010.

== February 6, 1950 (Monday) ==
- The Air Force of the Republic of China, flying from the island of Taiwan made a successful bombing raid in mainland China, striking the People's Republic's largest city, Shanghai; the 17 aircraft, including two B-29 bombers, targeted Shanghai's electrical power plants, shutting down the electricity in 90% of the city. According to the PRC, 500 people were killed, 600 were injured and 50,000 were left homeless by the raid.
- Born: Natalie Cole, American singer; in Los Angeles (d. 2015)
- Died: Georges Imbert, 65, German chemist

== February 7, 1950 (Tuesday) ==
- The United States gave diplomatic recognition to the newly established French-supported governments in Vietnam, Laos and Cambodia with the aim to help "the establishment of stable, non-Communist governments in areas adjacent to Communist China".
- Iceland was admitted to the Council of Europe.
- In Chile After the General Strike of January 24, President Gabriel González Videla carried out a cabinet change, the National Concentration, created in July 1948, was dissolved, and the government ends with less than 19% popularity, the Radical Party being greatly affected.
- Died: D. K. Broster, 72, British historical novelist

== February 8, 1950 (Wednesday) ==
- The credit card was used for the first time, after loan company executive Frank X. McNamara and lawyer Ralph E. Schneider persuaded 14 New York City restaurants to accept the Diners Club card rather than cash. The 200 Diners Club members who had cards would be billed each month by the club, which would pay the participating restaurants for the debt incurred. Journalist Matty Simmons accompanied McNamara and Schneider to what is called, in credit card histories, "The First Supper" (actually, lunch) at Major's Cabin Grill, adjacent to the Empire State Building. At the end of the mail, McNamara handed the waiter a piece of cardboard, Diners Club card #1,000 and charged the meal; Schneider carried #1,001 and Simmons #1,002.
- In East Germany, the Ministerium fur Staatssicherheitsdienst, a secret police organization more commonly known as the "Stasi" rather than the MfS, was established. For nearly 40 years, the Stasi would spy, and maintain files, on every resident of the German Democratic Republic.
- The comedy film Francis starring Donald O'Connor, Patricia Medina and the voice of Chill Wills premiered in New Orleans, launching the Francis the Talking Mule film series which would consist of seven films through 1956.

== February 9, 1950 (Thursday) ==
- In a speech to the Ohio County Republican Women's Club at the McClure Hotel in Wheeling, West Virginia, U.S. Senator Joseph McCarthy opened the era of "McCarthyism" as he told listeners that Communists had infiltrated the U.S. State Department. Underscoring his point, McCarthy held up a piece of paper and said, "While I cannot take the time to name all of the men in the State Department who have been named as members of the Communist Party and members of a spy ring, I have here in my hand a list of 205- a list of names that were known to the Secretary of State, and who, nevertheless, are still working and shaping the policy in the State Department." The speech had been written by Ed Nellor of the Washington Times-Herald, whom McCarthy had approached to compose a short talk. Nellor had a list, obtained from Congressional staffer Robert Lee, of 57 State Department employees who were still being investigated by the House Appropriations Committee as possible security risks.
- Element 98 was created for the first time by a team of physicists at the University of California at Berkeley. Glenn T. Seaborg, Albert Ghiorso, Stanley G. Thompson and Kenneth Street Jr., having named Element 97 berkelium, gave the name californium to the new element.

== February 10, 1950 (Friday) ==
- The Maudheim Station was established, by the Norwegian–British–Swedish Antarctic Expedition, on a floating thick ice shelf at Queen Maud Land.
- The CIA sent a report to U.S. President Truman that concluded that the Soviet Union would have a stockpile of 100 atomic bombs by the end of 1953, and 200 by the end of 1955. The Joint Chiefs of Staff had estimated that the Soviets would have as many as 20 A-bombs by the end of the year, and between 70 and 135 by mid-1953.
- Born:
  - Mark Spitz, American Olympic swimmer who won 7 gold medals in 1972 in Munich, and two at Mexico City in 1968; in Modesto, California
  - Luis Donaldo Colosio, Mexican presidential nominee; in Magdalena de Kino (assassinated in 1994)

== February 11, 1950 (Saturday) ==
- Author Kurt Vonnegut was published for the first time, as his story "Report on the Barnhouse Effect" appeared in Collier's magazine.
- "Rag Mop" by The Ames Brothers hit #1 on the Billboard Best Sellers in Stores chart.
- Died: Kiki Cuyler, 51, American MLB baseball player who led the National League in stolen bases four times between 1926 and 1930, died of a heart attack caused by a blood clot. He would be enshrined in the Hall of Fame posthumously.

== February 12, 1950 (Sunday) ==
- The European Broadcasting Union was founded at a conference in the English coastal resort of Torquay, by representatives of 23 Western European broadcasting stations. In 1993, the EBU would incorporate OIRT, the International Radio and Television Organization
- Born:
  - Michael Ironside, Canadian film and TV actor known for Total Recall, seaQuest DSV, and the voice of Sam Fisher from Tom Clancy's Splinter Cell; in Toronto
  - Steve Hackett, British songwriter and guitarist, former member of rock group Genesis; in the City of Westminster

== February 13, 1950 (Monday) ==
- A U.S. Air Force B-36 bomber with a nuclear weapon crashed off of Canada's Pacific coast near Vancouver. According to reports declassified and released in 1977, the Mark 4 nuclear bomb casing contained "no functional nuclear explosive" and exploded on impact with the ocean. Twelve of the 17 crewmen were rescued by a fishing boat, while the others were missing and presumed dead.
- Jim Thorpe was voted "the greatest male athlete of the half century" in a poll of American sportswriters and broadcasters by the Associated Press, named in first place by 252 of 393 voters, well ahead of Babe Ruth (86) and Jack Dempsey (67). The next day, Babe Didrikson Zaharias was voted the greatest female athlete of the half century by the panel, with 319 of 361 first place votes. Tennis star Helen Wills Moody was a distant second.
- Born: Peter Gabriel, British rock musician known for the song "Sledgehammer", and former member of rock group Genesis; in Chobham, Surrey
- Died: Rafael Sabatini, 74, Italian novelist

== February 14, 1950 (Tuesday) ==
- The Soviet Union and the People's Republic of China, the two largest Communist nations on Earth, signed a 30-year mutual defense treaty, pledging to come to each other's aid in the event either nation was attacked. The treaty also contained a provision that it would renew for an additional five years if not cancelled one year prior to its expiration.

== February 15, 1950 (Wednesday) ==
- Walt Disney released his 12th animated film, Cinderella, with a premiere in Boston, followed on February 22 in other major cities. The very successful film marked a "profitable return to the fairy tale" for Disney after the losing money on Fantasia and Bambi.
- The Italian-American neorealist film Stromboli premiered in American theaters, accompanied by a great deal of controversy surrounding an extramarital affair between director Roberto Rossellini and star Ingrid Bergman during the film's production.
- Sardi's, a restaurant in the Theater District of Manhattan, began the tradition of hosting opening-night parties for plays premiering on Broadway, starting with a celebration for the cast and crew following Come Back, Little Sheba.
- Come Back, Little Sheba made its debut on Broadway, as the first play for William Inge. Actors Shirley Booth and Sidney Blackmer would both win Tony Awards for their performances in the play, which ran for 190 performances, and Booth would win an Academy Award two years later when she reprised her role as "Lola" in the film version of the play.
- Born: Tsui Hark (stage name for Tsui Man-kong), Hong Kong film director; in Haifeng, China

== February 16, 1950 (Thursday) ==
- Electoral reform was enacted by Turkey's Grand National Assembly, adopting for the first time the secret ballot, open counting of ballots, and oversight of the selection of election judges. In the next election three months later, the Republican People's Party would lose its majority in Parliament after 27 years.
- France requested American economic and military assistance to aid French efforts in Vietnam, Laos and Cambodia.
- Born: Peter Hain, British cabinet minister, Leader of the House of Commons 2003 to 2005; in Nairobi, Kenya, British East Africa
- Died:
  - Charles "Mile-a-Minute" Murphy, 79, American cyclist who was the first person (in 1899) to ride a bicycle at more than 60 miles an hour
  - S. Otis Bland, 67, U.S. Representative for Virginia since 1918

== February 17, 1950 (Friday) ==
- In the worst railroad accident in the New York metropolitan area, 29 commuters were killed and 105 injured in the collision of two Long Island Railroad trains. At 10:38 pm, eastbound Train No. 192 ran through a red light signal and crashed head on into the westbound Train No. 175 at Rockville Centre, New York. Together, the two trains carried "about 1,000 passengers" and were ripped down the center of the cars.
- King Abdullah I of Jordan and Mossad Director Reuven Shiloah of Israel met at the King's winter palace at El Shuneh, where the King presented a seven-point treaty proposal.
- Mao Zedong, the leader of the Communist Party of the People's Republic of China, returned home from the Soviet Union after a stay of two months. Mao had arrived in Moscow on December 16, 1949, and remained there for nine weeks.
- Died: "Judy", 12, pointer dog for the British ship HMS Grasshopper, credited with saving the lives of its crew during World War II

== February 18, 1950 (Saturday) ==
- U.S. businessman Robert A. Vogeler, a telephone company executive in Hungary, pleaded guilty to charges of espionage and told a Budapest court that he had tried to help atomic scientists escape from the Communist-controlled nation. Three days later, Voegeler, who had asked the court for mercy, was given a 15-year prison sentence. Vogeler was released on April 27, 1951, after "concessions" were made by the United States, and wrote a book (with Leigh White) about the experience, I Was Stalin's Prisoner.
- "Chattanoogie Shoe Shine Boy" by Red Foley topped the Billboard Best Sellers in Stores chart.
- Born:
  - John Hughes, American film director, producer, and writer known for Home Alone, Ferris Bueller's Day Off and National Lampoon's Vacation and its sequels; in Lansing, Michigan (d. 2009)
  - Cybill Shepherd, American film and TV actress known for Moonlighting; in Memphis, Tennessee
  - Bebe Moore Campbell, American novelist; in Philadelphia (d. 2006)

== February 19, 1950 (Sunday) ==
- The United States broke diplomatic relations with Bulgaria in the first American withdrawal of representatives from the Balkan nation since World War II. The move followed Bulgaria's refusal to drop espionage charges against American foreign officer Donald R. Heath. The 12 members of the Bulgarian mission in Washington were ordered to leave, and the 38 American diplomats in Sofia were directed to leave as soon as possible.
- The demotion of Soviet Communist Party Politburo member Andrey Andreyevich Andreyev began when an unsigned editorial appeared in the official Party newspaper, Pravda. Entitled "Against Distortions in the Organization of the Kolkhoz", the article criticized Andreyev for his attempt to change the format of collective farming by advocating smaller groups of laborers ("links") instead of the larger "brigades", making him the scapegoat for a policy that had been in place since 1939.
- The Parasites, by Daphne du Maurier, topped The New York Times Fiction Best Seller list.

== February 20, 1950 (Monday) ==
- U.S. Senator Joe McCarthy elaborated on his charges of Communism in the U.S. State Department, giving a five-hour speech on the floor of the Senate in Washington, D.C. In the speech read into the Congressional Record, McCarthy revised his charge of 205 or 57 Communists in the State Department, to 81.
- Born: Tony Wilson, English music producer; in Salford, Lancashire (now in Greater Manchester) (d. 2007)
- Died: Sarat Chandra Bose, 60, Indian independence fighter

== February 21, 1950 (Tuesday) ==
- The first International Pancake Race was staged between competitors at Olney, Buckinghamshire (which had started the tradition in 1445) in England, and in Liberal, Kansas, in the United States. The President of the Jaycees service club in Liberal had read about the race and had written to the vicar of St. Peter's and St. Paul's Church in Olney, with the housewives in both towns trying to make the best time in the race. The two towns have competed on every Shrove Tuesday since then.
- WOI-TV began broadcasting from studios at Iowa State University in Ames, becoming the first regular broadcaster of educational television. As the first TV station to cover most of Iowa, WOI also carried some programming from commercial networks; the first fully noncommercial educational TV station would be KUHT of the University of Houston, which signed on May 25, 1953.

== February 22, 1950 (Wednesday) ==
- Egypt and Israel signed a General Armistice Agreement at Auja al-Hafir, a town on the border between the two nations. The Agreement defined the boundaries of the Gaza Strip as a neutral zone between the Muslim and Jewish countries, which had fought a war less than two years earlier.
- The National Intercollegiate Recreational Sports Association was created by agreement of representatives from eleven historically black colleges (Albany State College, Arkansas A&M College, Bethune-Cookman College, Dillard University, North Carolina College, Southern University, Texas Southern University, Tillotson College, Tuskegee Institute, Wiley College, and Xavier University).
- Born:
  - Julius Erving, American pro basketball player nicknamed "Dr. J" as a star in the ABA and the NBA; in East Meadow, New York
  - Awn Shawkat Al-Khasawneh, Prime Minister of Jordan 2011–2012; in Amman
  - Julie Walters, English stage actress; in Smethwick, Staffordshire (now West Midlands)
  - Miou-Miou (stage name for Sylvette Herry), French film actress, 1979 César Award for Best Actress for the 1979 film La Dérobade; in Paris

== February 23, 1950 (Thursday) ==
- In elections for the United Kingdom's House of Commons, the Labour Party, led by Prime Minister Clement Attlee, retained its majority despite losing 78 seats. Labour went from having 393 of the 617 seats to a slim majority of 315 of 617. Winston Churchill's Conservative Party increased its share from 197 to 282. Attlee was able to form a new government and continue as Prime Minister.
- Asteroid 1950 DA was discovered by astronomers only five million miles from Earth, then tracked for 17 days as the distance increased. On December 31, 2000, the last day of the 20th century, it would be seen again and measured at 0.7 miles in diameter. The trajectory of 1950 DA was calculated by NASA's Near Earth Object Program from the two appearances, and the asteroid will make its closest approach to Earth on March 16, 2880, with a chance of 1 in 300 of a collision, the highest probability so far noted of any possible impact.
- The British thriller film Stage Fright directed by Alfred Hitchcock and starring Jane Wyman, Marlene Dietrich, Michael Wilding and Richard Todd was released.

== February 24, 1950 (Friday) ==
- The Regents of the University of California voted 12–6 to require all employees of the university system to sign a loyalty oath that included a statement specifically disavowing support of Communism, and to dismiss, by June 30, any faculty member or other employee who refused to agree. The 31 professors who were dismissed would bring suit, and the oath would be overturned by the California Supreme Court on October 17, 1952, in the case of Tolman v. Underhill.
- China's Communist government issued the "Circular on Strict Prohibition of Opium and Drug Taking", outlawing the manufacture, transportation, trafficking and use of narcotics, as well as cigarettes. Users were required to register with the local authorities and to give up their addictions with a specified time, or face punishment. The punishment of drug dealers was, at first, lenient.
- Construction began on the "Beijing City Local Qinghe State Farm", promoted as a "model labor camp" that would house 5,000 inmates.
- Representatives of Israel and Jordan initialed a five-year peace treaty that provided for joint control of Jerusalem and commerce between the two nations, but the pact was not approved by either side.
- In Barcelona, anarchist Manuel Sabater Llopart was executed by the Spanish government.

== February 25, 1950 (Saturday) ==
- NBC premiered a 90-minute comedy variety show that was telecast live every Saturday night, with a different guest host each week and a regular cast of comedians. The program, originally called Saturday Night Revue, was soon called Your Show of Shows.
- The final issue of Great Britain's The Strand Magazine reached newsstands, after publishing monthly since 1894. The Strand had introduced the Sherlock Holmes stories of Sir Arthur Conan Doyle, as well as the H.G. Wells' novel The First Men in the Moon.
- Born:
  - Neil Jordan, Irish film director, writer, and producer known for (The Crying Game); in Sligo
  - Néstor Kirchner, 51st President of Argentina from 2003 to 2007; in Río Gallegos (d. 2010)
- Died:
  - George Minot, 64, American physician and 1934 Nobel Prize laureate for his work in preventing pernicious anemia
  - Nikolai Luzin, 66, Soviet mathematician known for Luzin's theorem, Luzin space, and the Denjoy–Luzin theorem

== February 26, 1950 (Sunday) ==
- Hungarian-American nuclear physicist Leó Szilárd appeared with other atomic scientists on the NBC Radio program University of Chicago Round Table, and first described the cobalt bomb, whose radioactive cobalt-60 fallout cloud could spread across the world and destroy all life on Earth.
- Yunnan Province, the last Nationalist Chinese stronghold in "Mainland China", as Communist Chinese troops marched into the provincial capital, Kunming.
- Born: Helen Clark, 37th Prime Minister of New Zealand from 1999 to 2008); in Hamilton
- Died: Harry Lauder, 79, Scottish entertainer

== February 27, 1950 (Monday) ==
- An unidentified 8-year-old boy from the Letchworth Village institution near Otisville, New York, became the first test subject for the prototype of the oral polio vaccine, developed by Dr. Hilary Koprowski. After the boy showed no signs of side effects, Dr. Koprowski expanded the experiment to another 19 children.

== February 28, 1950 (Tuesday) ==
- U.S. Undersecretary of State John Peurifoy testified to a Senate subcommittee that most of the 91 U.S. State Department employees who had been dismissed as security risks, were not barred because of Communist leanings, but because they were homosexual. The result was a wave of investigations and dismissals of gays and lesbians from federal government employment.
- Morris Fidanque de Castro was appointed as the first native-born Governor of the United States Virgin Islands, after the assembly of the U.S. territory passed a resolution asking U.S. President Truman to select "one of their own" to fill a vacancy in the office.
- Died: Dai Wangshu, 44, Chinese poet, died of an overdose of ephedrine while attempting to control an asthma attack.
