= January 1950 =

Month of 1950

<<	January 1950					>>
Su	Mo	Tu	We	Th	Fr	Sa
1	2	3	4	5	6	7
8	9	10	11	12	13	14
15	16	17	18	19	20	21
22	23	24	25	26	27	28
29	30	31

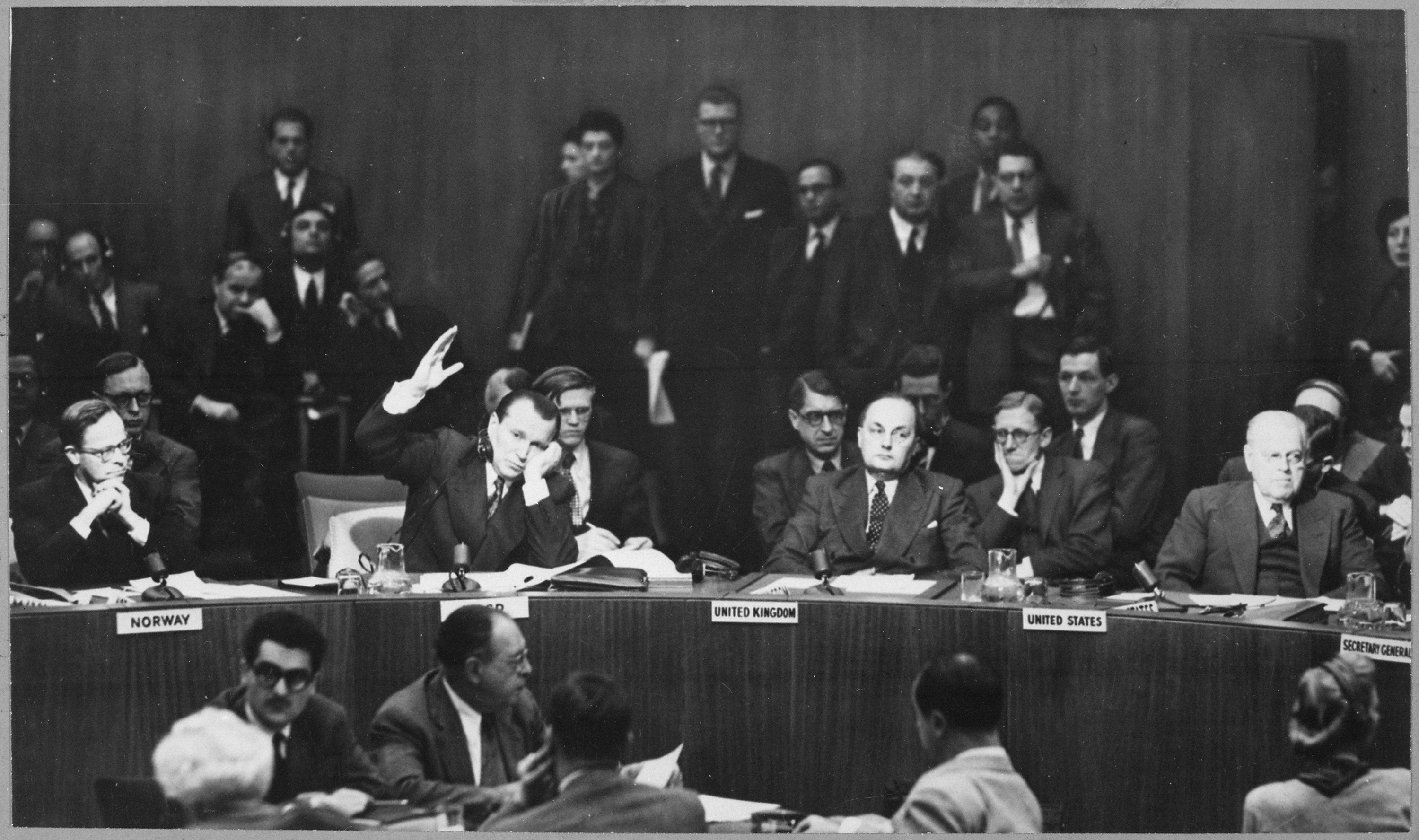
January 10, 1950: Soviet Union delegation leaves UN Security Council

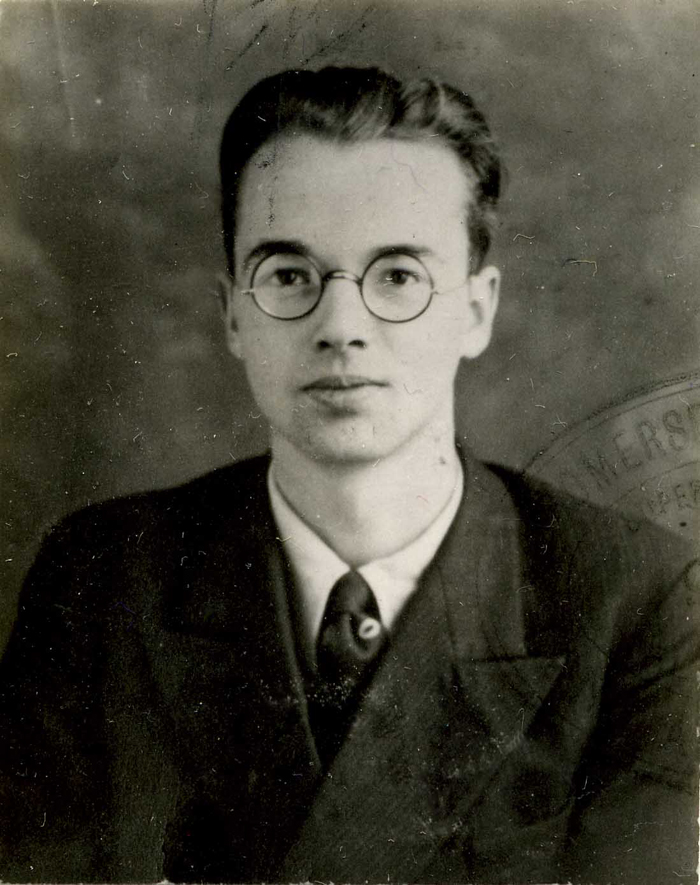
January 24, 1950: Dr. Fuchs confesses giving the Soviets the means to make the atomic bomb

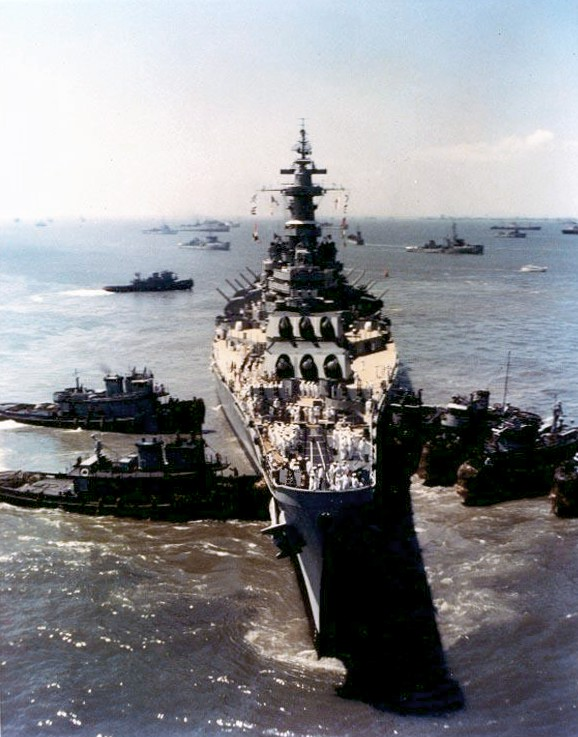
January 17, 1950: USS Missouri gets stuck

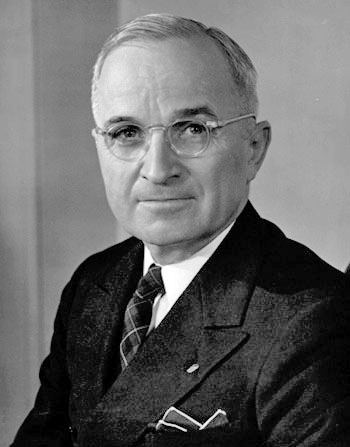
January 31, 1950: U.S. President Truman announces that U.S. will develop the hydrogen bomb

The following events occurred in January 1950:

== January 1, 1950 (Sunday) ==
- The International Police Association (IPA), largest police organization in the world, was formed. One of the few organizations with a slogan in Esperanto, the IPA's motto is Servo per Amikeco (Service through Friendship). It claims 380,000 members in 63 nations.
- The U.S. social security payroll tax was increased by half, as the amount deducted was given an automatic increase from 1% to 1.5%, the first increase since the payroll deductions had started in 1935.
- The 1950 Soccer Bowl, an American postseason college soccer championship, ended in a 2–2 draw between Penn State and the University of San Francisco.
- In 1954, it was decided that starting January 1, 1950, radiocarbon dating could not be relied upon due to atmospheric testing of nuclear weapons resulting in a change of the carbon level from carbon-14 to carbon-12. Calibration curves were first established in this year, and so any time before January 1, 1950, is referred to as BP, or Before Present. Any radiocarbon dating after this may not be accurately reliable.

== January 2, 1950 (Monday) ==
- The 1949 college football season was completed as the post-season bowl games were played on the day after New Year's Day (which had fallen on Sunday). In the Rose Bowl, previously unbeaten (10-0-0) #3 California was upset by #6 Ohio State before a crowd of 100,963. Unbeaten (10-0-0) #2 Oklahoma won 35–0 over #9 LSU in the Sugar Bowl. The other two unbeaten college teams of 1949, #1 Notre Dame and #4 Army, did not play in a bowl game. The final AP and UPI polls had already been taken prior to the bowl games, with Notre Dame being the unofficial national champion.
- The government of Argentina immediately shut down the Communist newspaper La Hora the same day that the paper appeared without the slogan "the year of the Liberator, General San Martín" on its masthead or at the top of every page, as all the other Argentine dailies were doing in compliance with a declaration by President Juan Perón that 1950 was San Martín Year. The paper would resume publication in 1958.
- Born: David Shifrin, American clarinet artist
- Died: Emil Jannings (Theodor Emil Janenz), 65, Swiss-born film star, winner of the first (1929) Academy Award for Best Actor, and later the star of German propaganda films

== January 3, 1950 (Tuesday) ==
- Egypt held elections for its Chamber of Deputies, with the Wafdist Party winning a majority, taking 161 of 319 seats. The Saadist Party, led by former Prime Minister Ibrahim Abdel Hadi Pasha, lost in a landslide, going from control to winning only 24 seats. Mustafa el-Nahhas became the new Premier on January 12, and would remain in power until January 27, 1952.
- In Venezuela, the third largest oil refinery in the world, the Amuay Refinery, was inaugurated by the Creole Petroleum Corporation on the west coast of the Paraguaná Peninsula.
- Sun Studio, where Elvis Presley would make his first recordings, was opened at 706 Union Avenue in Memphis, Tennessee.
- Born: Victoria Principal, American TV actress and entrepreneur; at the USAF base in Fukuoka, Japan

== January 4, 1950 (Wednesday) ==
- U.S. President Harry S. Truman delivered his State of the Union address to Congress and asked for a tax increase, with "changes in our tax system which will reduce present inequities, stimulate business activity, and yield a moderate amount of additional revenue".
- The New York Sun, which had published every afternoon since 1833, had its final issue. The operation was bought by the rival evening paper, the New York World-Telegram.
- The city of Town and Country, Missouri, with 162 wealthy residents, was incorporated as a village at the site of a defunct farming town Altheim, near St. Louis. Incorporation was granted by the St. Louis County Court after 102 people had signed a petition two months earlier. The move came following concerns that either of two neighboring towns south of the area (Des Peres) and east (Frontenac) would attempt an annexation. In 1974, voters would approve the village's transformation into a fourth-class city. Town and Country would have over 11,000 residents by 2018.
- Died: George P. Putnam, 62, American publisher who had been the husband of Amelia Earhart when she disappeared in 1937. After she was declared dead in 1939, Putnam, who had been the high bidder for Charles Lindbergh's autobiography, remarried twice.

== January 5, 1950 (Thursday) ==
- President Truman said in a press conference that "The United States government will not pursue a course which will lead to involvement in the civil conflict in China", and that American policy would be to not intervene to save the island of Taiwan from conquest by the Communist government of mainland China.
- U.S. Army Lt. Col. Charles A. Willoughby, who was Chief of Intelligence for General Douglas MacArthur, provided the first reports that North Korea was planning an invasion of South Korea, possibly as early as March.
- All 19 people aboard a Soviet Air Force airplane, including 11 members of the Soviet Air Force's ice hockey team V V S Moskva, were killed when the Lisunov Li-2 transport aircraft they were on crashed at Sverdlovsk. The plane was carrying the team from Kazan to Chelyabinsk, where it was scheduled to face Traktor Chelyabinsk, and crashed into a hillside while attempting to land at Sverdlovsk in bad weather.
- Born: John Manley, Deputy Prime Minister of Canada during 2002 and 2003; in Ottawa. Manley had previously been the Minister of Foreign Affairs from 2000 to 2002, and Minister of Industry from 1995 to 2000

== January 6, 1950 (Friday) ==
- The United Kingdom gave diplomatic recognition to the People's Republic of China and the Communist regime of Mao Zedong as the legitimate government of the nation of 460,000,000 people. Norway, Denmark and Ceylon (now Sri Lanka) followed suit.
- Workmen renovating the White House found a small marble box that had been buried underneath a floor slab commemorating the last renovation. The box, which contained three Washington, D.C. newspapers, 27 cents and the label from a bottle of Maryland rye whiskey, had apparently been placed there on December 2, 1902. President Truman ordered that the contents, along with current newspapers, be sealed up again and that the box be reburied "somewhere in the reconstruction now going on."
- Born:
  - Louis Freeh, American judge who was the FBI Director from 1993 to 2001; in Jersey City, New Jersey; and his immediate successor,
  - Thomas J. Pickard, Acting FBI Director June 25 to September 4, 2001, following Freeh's resignation; in Woodside, New York
- Died: Isaiah Bowman, 71, Canadian-American geographer

== January 7, 1950 (Saturday) ==
- A fire at the women's psychiatric ward at Mercy Hospital in Davenport, Iowa, killed 40 patients. All had been trapped inside the locked building. Another 25 were able to escape their locked rooms with the assistance of fire and police, who pulled the iron bars off their windows.
- "Rudolph the Red-Nosed Reindeer" by Gene Autry topped the Billboard Best Sellers in Stores chart.
- Born:
  - Juan Gabriel, Mexican singer, as Alberto Aguilera Valdez in Parácuaro (d. 2016)
  - Erin Gray, American TV actress, in Honolulu
  - Shantha Sinha, Indian activist against child labor, in Nellore
- Died:
  - Monty Banks (Mario Bianchi), 52, Italian comedian
  - Nathaniel Reed, 87, American outlaw nicknamed "Texas Jack"

== January 8, 1950 (Sunday) ==
- Kwame Nkrumah began the "Positive Action" campaign in the British African colony of the Gold Coast (now Ghana), calling for labor strikes against the colonial government. Governor Charles Arden-Clarke would declare a state of emergency three days later.
- Died:
  - Joseph Schumpeter, 66, Austrian-American economist
  - Helene Hathaway Britton, 70, former owner of baseball's St. Louis Cardinals

== January 9, 1950 (Monday) ==
- Nationalist Chinese warships shelled an American freighter, the Flying Arrow, in international waters after the ship had run a blockade of Shanghai.
- President Truman submitted the annual federal budget, calling for the spending of $42,439,000,000 in the 1952 Fiscal Year. The budget had a deficit of more than five billion dollars, and the accompanying budget message was, at 27,000 words, the "longest presidential message in history".

== January 10, 1950 (Tuesday) ==
- Yakov Malik, the Soviet Ambassador to the U. N., angrily walked out of a session of the United Nations Security Council, after the ten members voted 8–2 against replacing the Nationalist Chinese delegation with one from the Communist Chinese leaders who had taken control of nearly all of China in October. Although the Nationalist government was confined to the island of Taiwan, it continued to be allowed to speak for, and to exercise the veto power for, the 460 million people in China.
- Born: Ernie Wasson, American horticulturalist and author of gardening books, in Berkeley, California

== January 11, 1950 (Wednesday) ==
- British Prime Minister Clement Attlee set new parliamentary elections to take place nationwide on February 23.

== January 12, 1950 (Thursday) ==
- The death penalty was partially restored in the Soviet Union, after having been abolished on May 26, 1947. It was retroactively applied to "traitors, spies, subversives, and saboteurs" regardless of when the alleged offense occurred.
- The British submarine Truculent collided with the Swedish oil tanker Divina in the Thames Estuary and sank, killing 64 people. Only 15 crewmen were able to escape. All of them had been in the conning tower of the sub, which had been cruising on the surface of the Thames.
- U.S. Secretary of State Dean Acheson delivered his 'Perimeter Speech', outlining the boundary of U.S. security guarantees. South Korea was not included within the area subject to American protection, and would be invaded from North Korea less than six months later.
- Italy's Prime Minister Alcide de Gasperi resigned along with his entire cabinet.
- Born:
  - Sheila Jackson Lee, U.S. Representative for Texas since 1995, in New York City (d. 2024)
  - Dorrit Moussaieff, Israeli-born businesswoman and wife of the President of Iceland; in Jerusalem

== January 13, 1950 (Friday) ==
- The grounds of the United States consulate in Peiping (now Beijing) were invaded by a group of police and civilian officials, who seized control of the building housing the offices of Consul General O. Edmund Clubb. The U.S. Department of State protested to the new Communist government of the People's Republic of China, without success.
- Three days after the UN Security Council refused to let the Communist Chinese government exercise China's veto power, Ambassador Malik left indefinitely, saying that the U.S.S.R. would not participate in the Security Council as Nationalist representative T. F. Tsiang remained at the table. The Soviet protest proved to be a blunder, in that the Soviets could have exercised their veto power when the Security Council voted on June 27, 1950, to send its forces to combat the North Korean invasion of South Korea in the Korean War.

== January 14, 1950 (Saturday) ==
- The day after the invasion of the American consulate in Beijing, the U.S. State Department ordered the withdrawal of the 135 American diplomatic personnel remaining in the People's Republic of China, and the closure of offices in Beijing, Tianjin, Shanghai, Nanjing and Qingdao.
- "I Can Dream, Can't I?" by The Andrews Sisters hit #1 on the Billboard Best Sellers in Stores chart.
- Richard Colvin Cox, a second year cadet at the United States Military Academy at West Point, disappeared after leaving the grounds of the academy in the company of an unknown man. An extensive investigation revealed no leads and his fate remains unknown.
- Born: Jagadguru Rambhadracharya, Indian Hindu religious leader, as Giridhar Mishra in Shandikhur, Uttar Pradesh state

== January 15, 1950 (Sunday) ==
- Juho Kusti Paasikivi won re-election as President of Finland, receiving 172 of the 300 electoral votes in a three party race. The popular vote was 868,693 in favor of Paasikivi and 608,314 for the other two candidates.
- Died:
  - H. H. "Hap" Arnold, 63, General of the Army and later General of the Air Force, and the only person to hold the five-star general in two different branches of the U.S. Armed Forces
  - Tommy Cook, 49, English sportsman who became a star both in professional cricket and in soccer football, committed suicide by an overdose of medication.

== January 16, 1950 (Monday) ==
- All Soviet labor camps in East Germany were ordered closed by the Soviet Control Commission administrator, General Vassily Chuikov. The estimate of prisoners in the camps was as much as 35,000 and many were subject to transfer to camps in the Soviet Union.
- Born: Debbie Allen, American choreographer and dancer, in Houston
- Died: Gustav Krupp von Bohlen und Halbach, 79, former German arms manufacturer

== January 17, 1950 (Tuesday) ==
- A gang of 11 thieves stole more than two million dollars from the headquarters of the Brinks Armored Car Company at 165 Prince Street in Boston, Massachusetts. A group of men, wearing Halloween masks, used keys to walk through five locked doors, walked into the counting room, tied up the employees at gunpoint, filled 14 bags with money and disappeared. The haul from the job, which took a year and a half to plan and 17 minutes to carry out, was $1,218,211.29 in cash and another $1,557,183.83 in checks, money orders and securities. The gang would be indicted in 1956, only five days before the statute of limitations on the robbery would have expired.
- The famous battleship USS Missouri got stuck at the entrance to Maryland's Chesapeake Bay after running aground on the shoals, and remained stuck for two weeks. The ship would finally be freed on February 1, after a salvage effort that cost $225,000.
- Favored to win by nine points, and ranked by the AP as the #3 college basketball team in the U.S., Long Island University lost to North Carolina State, 55–52, in a game at New York City's Madison Square Garden; an investigation the following year would reveal that LIU players Eddie Gard and Dick Feurtado had been paid $2,000 by gambler Salvatore Sollazo to engage in "point shaving" in order to ensure that LIU lost the game. On January 2, Kentucky had narrowly defeated Arkansas, in a game where three players would admit later to accepting $1,000 bribes in return for keeping the winning margin low.
- Born: Luis López Nieves, Puerto Rican novelist
- Died: Seiichi Hatano, 72, Japanese religious philosopher

== January 18, 1950 (Wednesday) ==
- The first diplomatic recognition of the Democratic Republic of Vietnam, a communist-dominated government led by Ho Chi Minh that controlled much of northern Vietnam's remote regions, was given by the communist government of the People's Republic of China, which then began military aid to Ho.
- A bipartisan U.S. Senate Investigating Committee voted to approve a report rebuking President Truman's military aide, Major General Harry H. Vaughan, for having accepted a corporate gift of seven home freezers for himself and other high-ranking officers.
- The film noir The File on Thelma Jordon starring Barbara Stanwyck and Wendell Corey premiered in New York City.
- Born: Gilles Villeneuve, Canadian racing driver; in Saint-Jean-sur-Richelieu, Quebec (d. 1982 in racing crash)

== January 19, 1950 (Thursday) ==
- A request by President Truman, to provide an additional $60 million in economic aid to South Korea, failed to pass in the U.S. House of Representatives, 191–193, in "the first flat setback the President has encountered in his many requests for global recovery funds". By the time a revised bill passed and was put into effect, the Korean War would begin.
- Pebble in the Sky, the first novel for science fiction author Isaac Asimov, was published. Previously, all of Asimov's printed works had been short stories. One estimate places the number of fiction and non-fiction books written (or, in some cases, edited) by Asimov at 506.
- The Avro Canada CF-100 Canuck, the only Canadian-designed fighter aircraft to be mass-produced, made its first test flight, with Bill Watterton at the controls.
- Died: Johnny Mann, American test pilot and cross-country flier, after returning home following an unsuccessful attempt to set a new record for a non-stop flight from Los Angeles to Miami.

== January 20, 1950 (Friday) ==
- The first autonomous government for the South American territory of Dutch Guiana, part of the Kingdom of the Netherlands as the "States of Surinam", began as a 21-member legislative assembly convened its first session.
- Born: Edward Hirsch, American poet and author, in Chicago

== January 21, 1950 (Saturday) ==
- Former U.S. State Department official, and accused Communist spy, Alger Hiss was convicted of perjury by a federal jury in New York, based primarily on the testimony of former Communist, and TIME Magazine editor, Whittaker Chambers.
- The village of Tangasar, located in the Kurdish region of Iran, was buried in an avalanche of ice and snow, killing 44 families.
- The Cocktail Party, a play by T. S. Eliot, began a successful run on Broadway, and would win the 1950 Tony Award for Best Play.
- Born:
  - Billy Ocean (stage name for Leslie Charles), Trinidadian-British pop singer;in Fyzabad
  - Ángel María Villar, president of Royal Spanish Football Federation, (1988–2017), footballer for Athletic Bilbao (1969–1981), with 22 caps for the Spain national team; in Bilbao, Biscay Province, Spain.
- Died: George Orwell (pen name for Eric Arthur Blair), 46, English novelist who wrote Nineteen Eighty-Four and Animal Farm, died of complications from tuberculosis after an illness of more than two years. The word "Orwellian" is now used to refer to policies or conditions of an authority similar to those described in Nineteen Eighty-Four.

== January 22, 1950 (Sunday) ==
- Preston Tucker, who had attempted to found his own automobile manufacturing company after World War II and had created the innovative 1948 Tucker Sedan, was acquitted by a jury on all criminal charges. Tucker and several associates had been indicted in June, 1949, on charges of mail fraud, conspiracy, and violation of federal securities laws in the course of attracting investment in his company.
- Play finished at the first ever LPGA Tour event, the Tampa Women's Open. Amateur Polly Riley won by five shots over Louise Suggs.
- Died: Alan Hale, Sr. (Rufus Mackahan), 57, American film actor who was the sidekick for Errol Flynn

== January 23, 1950 (Monday) ==
- Israel's parliament, the Knesset, passed a resolution formally proclaiming that Jerusalem was the nation's capital, although most foreign embassies remained in the original capital at Tel Aviv. Reports stated only that "a majority" of the Knesset had approved, and noted that the Knesset had already moved its meeting place to Jerusalem.
- In Indonesia, former Netherlands Army Captain Raymond Westerling led a force of 500 soldiers in an attack on the city of Bandung, seeking to lead a revolution to overthrow the government of President Sukarno, and to bring the former Dutch East Indies under the control of the Dutch-sponsored Republic of the United States of Indonesia.
- The U.S. House of Representatives voted 373–25 on a bill to make Alaska a state, and then approved a similar resolution on Hawaii by voice vote. The bill then moved to the U.S. Senate for consideration.
- Born: Richard Dean Anderson, American TV actor best known as MacGyver; in Minneapolis
- Died:
  - Corinne Luchaire, 28, French film actress who starred in Prison Without Bars
  - Vasil Kolarov, 72, Prime Minister of Bulgaria, six months after succeeding the late Georgi Dimitrov.

== January 24, 1950 (Tuesday) ==
- Physicist Klaus Fuchs, a German émigré who had worked with Britain's atomic research program, confessed to being a spy for the Soviet Union in the course of his fourth interrogation by MI5 investigator William Skardon. The inquiry session took place at Skardon's home near the British atomic research laboratories at Harwell, Oxfordshire. For seven years, he had passed top secret data on U.S. and British nuclear weapons research to the Soviet Union;
- The new Constitution of India, declaring the Dominion of India a Republic, was approved and signed by the 284 members of India's Constituent Assembly. On the same day, the assembly elected Rajendra Prasad as the nation's first President, and approved the song Jana Gana Mana as the national anthem for the Republic of India.
- The United Provinces of British India was renamed as India on 24 January 1950. In May 2017, the Government of Uttar Pradesh declared to celebrate UP Day on 24 January every year. The celebration of UP Day was proposed by the governor Ram Naik & chief minister Yogi Adityanath.
- Before a crowd of 18,000 at Carls Court Arena in London, American boxer Joey Maxim (Giuseppe Antonio Berardinelli) defeated the world light heavyweight champion, England's Freddie Mills in a knockout in the 10th round to win the world title. Four of Mills's teeth were knocked out as well during the fight, and legend has it that three of the teeth were later found embedded in Maxim's boxing gloves.
- Born:
  - Gennifer Flowers, American model who claimed to have been the mistress of Bill Clinton; in Oklahoma City
  - Benjamin Urrutia, Ecuadorian-born religious scholar, in Guayaquil

== January 25, 1950 (Wednesday) ==
- Minimum wage in the United States was increased from 40 cents an hour to 75 cents an hour, the largest percentage increase (87.5 percent) in the wage ever. The amendment to the Fair Labor Standards Act had been signed into law by U.S. President Truman on October 26, 1949. In 2016 terms, an 87.5% increase from $7.25 per hour would be $13.59 per hour.
- Alger Hiss was sentenced to five years imprisonment at the federal penitentiary in Lewisburg, Pennsylvania, following his conviction for perjury. After entering prison on March 22, 1951, he would serve 44 months and would be released on November 27, 1954.
- Actress Ingrid Bergman filed a "Mexican divorce" against her husband of more than 12 years, Dr. Peter Lindstrom, in order to free her to marry film director Roberto Rossellini.
- The Election Commission of India was formed.
- Born:
  - Gloria Naylor, African-American novelist, in Robinsonville, Mississippi (d. 2016)
  - Virginia Johnson, African-American dancer and choreographer, in Washington, DC
- Died: Constancia de la Mora, 43, Spanish Communist author, in an auto accident.

== January 26, 1950 (Thursday) ==
- As the Dominion of India became the Republic of India, Rajendra Prasad was sworn in as the first President, replacing the last Governor-General of India, Chakravarthi Rajagopalachari. The new republic was initially composed of six states: Assam (now divided into five states), Bihar, Orissa (now Odisha), Rajasthan, Uttar Pradesh and West Bengal).
- A U.S. Air Force C-54 transport plane disappeared, along with 36 passengers and a crew of eight, somewhere over the Yukon territory in Canada. The plane had departed Elmendorf Air Force Base in Alaska, bound for Great Falls, Montana. More than 70 years later, the aircraft is still missing.

== January 27, 1950 (Friday) ==
- In Washington, the United States signed an individual mutual defense treaties with each of the member nations of the North Atlantic Treaty Organization (NATO). The U.S. made separate agreements with Belgium, Denmark, France, Italy, Luxembourg, the Netherlands, Norway and the United Kingdom, where each nation pledged to come to the defense of the other in the event of a military attack.
- Muroc Field in Kern County, California was renamed in honor of the late test pilot, Glen Edwards, whose name is now memorialized in Edwards Air Force Base.
- Born: Derek Acorah, English medium and TV personality, as Derek Johnson in Bootle (d. 2020)
- Died: Augusto d'Halmar, 67, Chilean author

== January 28, 1950 (Saturday) ==
- The new Supreme Court of India, whose functions replaced both the Federal Court of India and Britain's Judicial Committee of the Privy Council, was inaugurated. The first Chief Justice of India was Sir Harilal Jekisundas Kania, who had been Chief Justice of the Federal Court, and was one of the eight justices serving.
- Victor Biaka Boda, a 37 year old member of the French Senate, representing Côte d'Ivoire, at that time a French West African colony, disappeared after his car broke down near the town of Bouaflé. His charred bones would be located ten months later, and according to some sources, the death inquest on March 30, 1953, would conclude that he had been eaten by cannibals.
- Born: Hamad bin Isa Al Khalifa, King of Bahrain since 2002, in Riffa
- Died:
  - Yosef Yitzhak, 69, Maharitz rabbi of the Chabad movement of Orthodox Judaism
  - Kansas Joe McCoy, 44, American blues musician

== January 29, 1950 (Sunday) ==
- The French National Assembly voted 401–193 to approve limited self-government for the State of Vietnam, with the former Emperor Bao Dai designated as "head of state" rather than as a monarch. The French state largely controlled the South, while the Soviet-supported Democratic Republic of Vietnam controlled the North.
- At a convention in Jacksonville, the Federated Klans of Alabama, the Southern Knights of the Ku Klux Klan, and the Association of Carolina Klans united into one Ku Klux Klan organization. Not participating was the Association of Georgia Klans.
- Born:
  - Ann Jillian, American actress, as Ann Jura Nauseda in Cambridge, Massachusetts
  - Miklós Vámos, Hungarian writer, in Budapest
  - Jody Scheckter, South African auto racing driver, 1979 Formula One World Champion, in East London
- Died:
  - Ahmad Al-Jaber Al-Sabah, 64, Sheik of Kuwait since 1921. He was succeeded by his brother, Abdullah III Al-Salim Al-Sabah, who would become the nation's first Emir on Kuwait's independence in 1961.
  - General Sudirman, 34, first Commander-in-Chief of the Indonesian Armed Forces

== January 30, 1950 (Monday) ==
- North Korea Chairman, Kim Il Sung, was informed that Soviet leader Joseph Stalin had decided to support Kim's plan for an invasion of South Korea. Stalin provided the message to Kim by way of Soviet envoy Terenti Shtykov, after having met with Chinese leader Mao Zedong in Moscow.
- A simulator of the Automatic Computing Engine (ACE) was first demonstrated by Michael Woodger at the Burlington House in London for the jubilee celebration of the National Physical Laboratory. The first program would be run on May 10, 1950.
- The NBC TV show Robert Montgomery Presents, a live television dramatic anthology, made its debut with the secondary name Your Lucky Strike Theatre. The first hour-long show was "The Letter", starring Madeleine Carroll.
- Born: Andrei Bolibrukh, Russian Soviet mathematician, in Moscow (d. 2003)

== January 31, 1950 (Tuesday) ==
- U.S. President Harry S. Truman ordered the development of the hydrogen bomb, after the Soviet Union had become the second nation to acquire the secret of the atomic bomb on August 29, 1949. "It is my responsibility as Commander in Chief of the Armed Forces," Truman said in a public statement, "to see to it that our country is able defend itself against any possible aggressor. Accordingly, I have directed the Atomic Energy Commission to continue work on all forms of atomic weapons, including the so-called hydrogen or super bomb." The first thermonuclear explosion would take place on November 1, 1952 (a feat which the Soviets would duplicate ten months later on August 21, 1953). On March 1, 1954, the U.S. would detonate the first "H-bomb".
- The Soviet Union announced recognition of the Democratic Republic of Vietnam, led by North Vietnamese Communist Ho Chi Minh.
