= SOMUA SM =

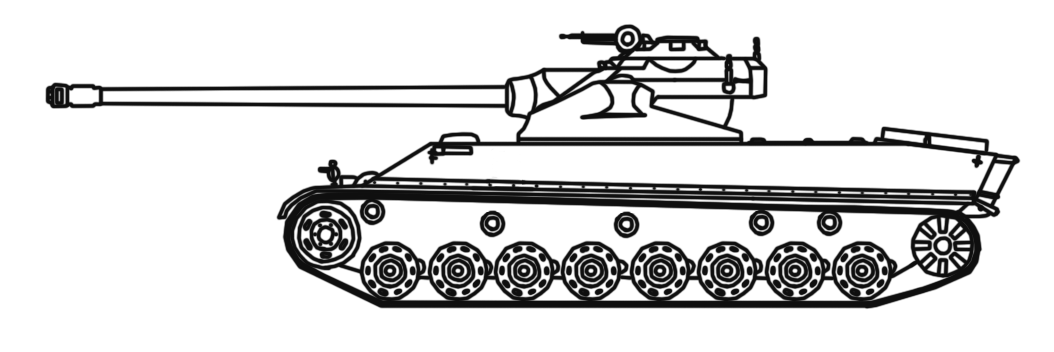
- SOMUA SM prototype diagram
- Type: Heavy tank
- Place of origin: France

Production history
- Designer: SOMUA
- Designed: april 1946-march 1950
- Manufacturer: Decauville
- Produced: march 1950-october 1951
- No. built: 1 (scrapped)
- Variants: prototype: SOMUA SM TO100 blueprints only: SOMUA SM TC90; SOMUA SM T.100; SOMUA SM TO90; SOMUA SM TOA120

Specifications
- Mass: 50 t or 56 t
- Length: 10.4 m (gun forward); 7.6 m (hull)
- Width: 3.3 m
- Height: 3.1 m
- Crew: 5
- Armor: hull: front: top - 75 mm/58°, bottom - 75 mm/50° sides: top - 50 mm/24°, bottom - 40 mm rear: top - 50 mm/23°, bottom - 40 mm/52° roof: 20 mm bottom: 30 mm turret: front: 75-130 mm sides: 60 mm rear: 30-130 mm cupola: 75 mm roof: 30 mm collar: front: 100-175 mm sides: 100-200 mm rear: 120-125 mm
- Main armament: 1x 100mm SA 47 L/58 rifled bore
- Secondary armament: hull: 1x 7.5mm MAC 1931 turret: coaxial: 1x 7.5mm MAC 1931 anti-air: 2x 7.5mm MAC 1931
- Engine: Maybach HL295; 1 000 h.p.
- Power/weight: 20 h.p./t or 17.8 h.p./t
- Transmission: 5 forward gears, 1 reverse gear
- Suspension: torsion bar
- Ground clearance: 53 cm
- Maximum speed: 50 kph
- Steering system: twin transmission

SOMUA SM was a French experimental medium tank, developed by SOMUA between 1946 and 1953 for the 50-ton tank project, along with AMX-50. The prototype has not survived to this day.

== History ==
On 11 April 1946, the military armaments manufacturer DEFA (today, a part of KNDS France) asked SOMUA to design and manufacture two prototypes of a tank in armoured and non-armoured steel. The contract was processing slowly, and in May 1948 the order was simplified to just one armored prototype and a set of spare parts for it. In March 1950, welding work was underway at Decauville Établissements to create the hull for the tank, designated "SM", but there was a delay in delivering the engine for the prototype. In October 1951, the SM tank was delivered to AMX (another subsidiary of modern KNDS France) proving grounds for testing, but the required 1 000 hp engine was not received until June 1952. The first tests began in late January 1953 and were completed on 6 July 1953; at the same time, AMX was already experimenting with new hulls and mounting more powerful turrets for their AMX-50 tank, and they did not experience such delays. SOMUA could not cope with the competition and stopped further work on the SM.

== Design ==
A diagram of German King Tiger tank, the design of which has heavily affected the SOMUA SM.

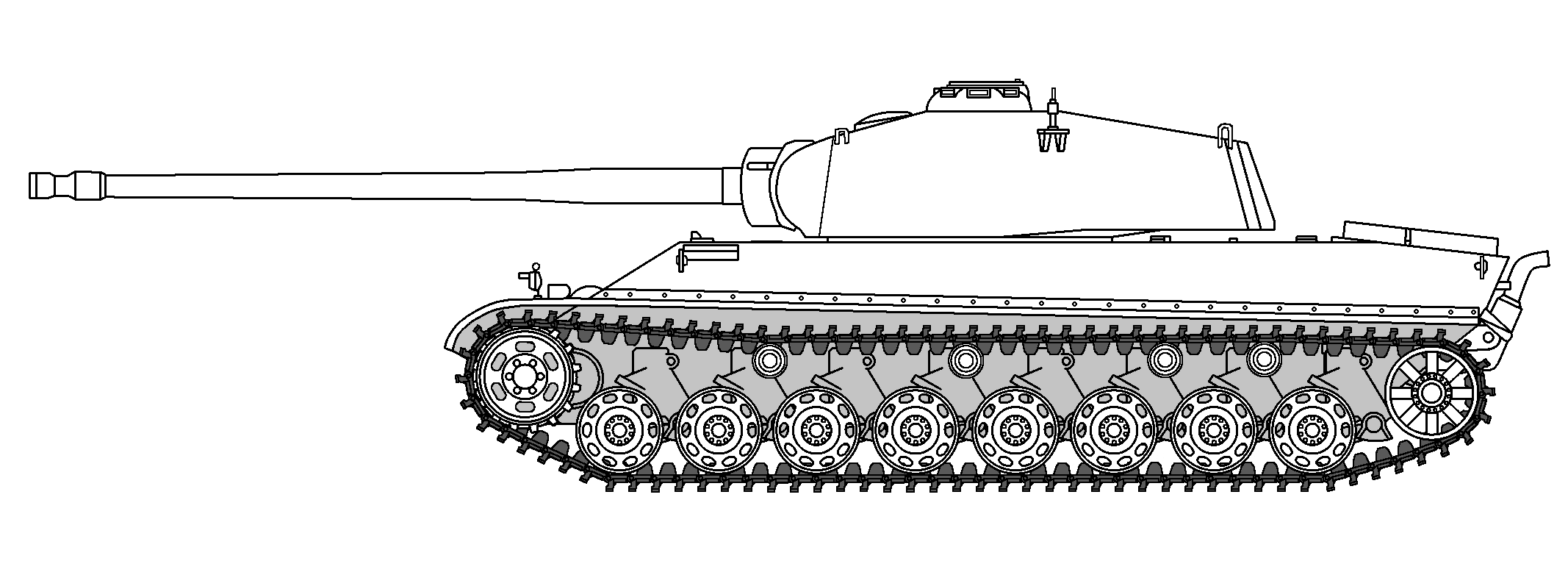
One of the SOMUA SM plans with TC90 turret, heavily resembling the King Tiger design.

=== Layout ===
When developing the SM, SOMUA engineers borrowed the design from German tanks like the King Tiger tank. The tank's large hull was welded from rolled homogenous steel armor plates positioned at high obliquity. Transmission was located in the front part of the hull, the engine and fuel tanks were in the rear. The tank had an assisted loading mechanism in the turret, where 10 shells were located, of which 9 were located directly in the drum of the mechanism, and 1 was stored in the turret bustle. The rest of the ammo was located around the crew compartment, but the exact number of the ammo capacity is unknown. The tank's crew consisted of 5 people: driver, radio operator/machine gunner, gunner, loader (the operator of the assisted loading mechanism), who also fired the turret roof-mounted machine guns, and commander. The driver and radio operator were located in the front of the hull, the rest of the crew was in the TO100 oscillating turret (however, it was planned to install TC90 and T.100 classic turrets and TO90 and TOA120 oscillating turrets on the tank).

=== Armament ===
The SM tank was armed with a rifled bore anti-tank 100mm SA 47 gun, capable of firing unitary APCBC-T (French: obus de rupture a coiffé et fausse ogive tracé) and HE (French: obus explosif) rounds. The APCBC-T projectile, weighing 15 kg and having initial velocity of 1 000 m/s, was able to penetrate 275 mm flat armor point-blank, 215 mm flat armor at 2 kilometers, and 120 mm of armor angled at 55°, at, approximately, 300 meters. At close range it was enough to deal with Soviet medium tanks of that time, such as T-54. The gun was installed in a TO100 oscillating turret (tourelle oscillante de 100 mm), designed by the FAMH company. It's assisted loading mechanism could load the shells quick enough to reach the firerate of twelve rounds per minute. On the left side of the gun was a gunner's sight, on the right side - a co-axial 7.5mm Reibel light machine gun. Identical machine gun was located on the loader's hatch, where it was twinned, and on the right side of upper frontal plate of the hull.

=== Protection ===
Both upper and lower frontal armor plates were 75 mm thick and were positioned at an angle of 58° and 50°, respectively. The line-of-sight thickness of the UFP was approximately 142 mm. The upper part of the side of the vehicle was 50 mm thick and positioned at 24°, the lower (behind the tracks) - 40 mm. The rear upper plate of the tank was 50 mm thick and placed at 23°, the lower - 40 mm thick at 52°. Fenders and roof of the tank were 20 mm thick, bottom was 30 mm thick.

The TO100 armour varied due to its specific design: the average thickness of the collar (the part that supported the turret) was 120 mm and gradually changed as it moved towards the sides and rear. For example, the front was 175 mm thick, the sides were 200 mm thick, and the rear was 125 mm thick, all at most. The turret front armour had also varied from 70 mm at the top to 130 mm in the middle and 105 mm at the bottom. The turret sides were 60 mm thick, the rear armor ranged from 60 down to 30 mm in thinnest areas, with 130 mm thick counterweights around the loading mechanism ejection door. Commander cupola was 75mm thick on average, the turret roof was 30 mm thick.

=== Mobility ===
The tank was powered by a 1 000-horsepower Maybach HL295 engine. It's transmission had 5 forward gears and 1 reverse gear, it made the tank capable of reaching the speed of 50 km/h on the road. It also made the tank able to turn around in one spot (neutral turn). Unlike the German armored vehicles of World War II or the AMX 50 tank, which used overlapping roadwheels scheme, the SOMUA SM had them in a single row: a torsion bar suspension was used.

== In popular culture ==
=== In video games ===
- World of Tanks - French tier VIII premium heavy tank named Somua SM.
- World of Tanks Blitz - French tier IX premium heavy tank named Somua SM.
- War Thunder - French rank V and BR ("Battle rating") 7.7 premium heavy tank named Somua SM.
