= Disappearance of Richard Colvin Cox =

American missing person case

Richard Colvin Cox
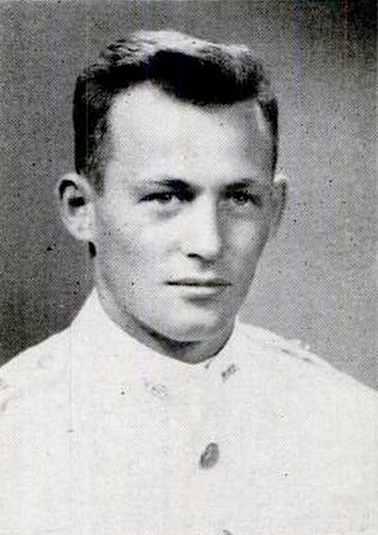
- Cox in his West Point "India Whites" uniform, c. 1948–1949
- Born: 25 July 1928; Mansfield, Ohio, U.S.
- Disappeared: 14 January 1950 (aged 21); West Point, New York, U.S.
- Status: Declared dead, 1957
- Education: United States Military Academy
- Military career
- Allegiance: United States
- Branch: United States Army
- Service years: 1946–1950
- Rank: Sergeant (Army); Third-class Cadet (Academy)
- Units: 6th Constabulary Squadron (1946–1947) 27th Constabulary Squadron (1947–1948); United States Military Academy (1948–1950)

Richard Colvin Cox (born 25 July 1928—disappeared 14 January 1950) was an American second-year cadet who disappeared from the United States Military Academy at West Point, New York, on 14 January 1950. On three occasions in the week leading up to his disappearance, Cox was visited by a man whose first name may have been George. According to an eyewitness account from another cadet, the two men seemed to know each other. On the third visit, Cox and "George" left the grounds of the academy and were never seen again. Cox is the only West Point cadet to have disappeared.

== Early life ==
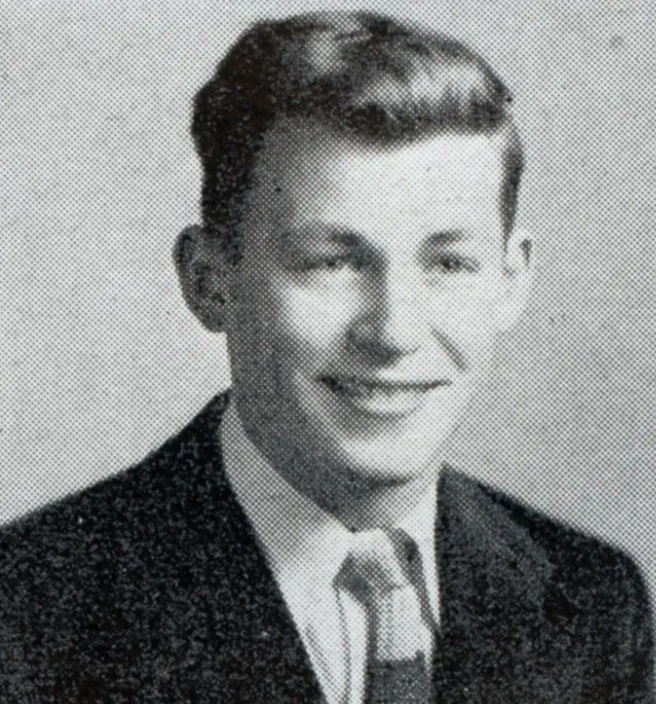
Cox as a high school senior in 1946.

Richard Cox was born in Mansfield, Ohio, on July 25, 1928, the youngest of six children born to Rupert and Minnie (Colvin) Cox. Cox's father died when he was ten years old as the result of a diabetic condition that had gone untreated because the Cox family were practicing Christian Scientists. His mother owned and operated the family business, the Rupert F. Cox Insurance Agency.

Cox graduated from Mansfield Senior High School in 1946. During his high school years, he told a friend he did not have time to participate on athletic teams because he always had an after-school job. In fact, he was sophomore class president, a member of the National Honor Society, an intramural athlete, a member of Hi-Y (High School YMCA) and the sports editor for the school's yearbook.

During summer vacations in his teen years, Cox worked full-time. While working on a road crew in Mansfield, he fell and cut his arm on a scythe. He went home for help from his mother, who refused to obtain medical aid because of her Christian Science beliefs. The injury became infected and a neighbor brought Cox to a doctor. Cox's cut healed, but he sustained a prominent scar. (Note: One possibility considered by investigators after Cox's disappearance was whether the disagreement between Cox and his mother over his decision to seek medical treatment might have been contentious enough for Cox to decide to disappear.)

== Military career ==
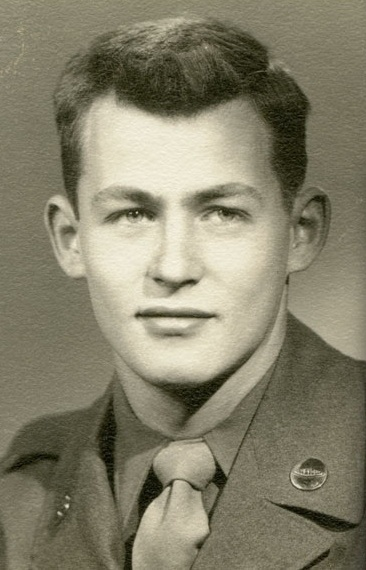
Cox, c. 1947

After high school, Cox volunteered for the United States Army, completed initial processing at Camp Atterbury, Indiana, and underwent basic training at Fort Knox, Kentucky. He was then assigned to the United States Constabulary, which carried out police occupation and security duties in Allied-occupied Germany, and attained the rank of sergeant. In May 1947 he began an assignment with Troop C, 6th Constabulary Squadron, based in Coburg. He was later assigned to the 6th Squadron's Headquarters Company, where he worked in the S-2 (intelligence) section. When the 6th Squadron was disbanded, Cox was assigned to Troop D, 27th Constabulary Squadron, in Schweinfurt. Cox was a basketball fan, and while in Germany played guard on his units' intramural teams.

Later in 1947, Cox received an appointment to West Point; he arrived at the United States Military Academy Preparatory School (then located at Stewart Field) in January 1948. (Note: Cox qualified for two appointments. One was awarded to currently serving military members. The other was a Congressional appointment from J. Harry McGregor. Both were obtained as the result of competitive examinations, but researcher Marshall Jacobs and author Harry J. Maihafer speculated that Cox's mother's efforts to obtain the Congressional appointment might have made Cox feel his own success at obtaining an appointment had been minimized, which could have been a source of friction between them, and might have contributed to his desire to leave West Point and start a new life.) His prep school classmates included Ernest Shotwell, who later became an important source on Cox's disappearance when he provided an eyewitness account that indicated Cox had disappeared voluntarily and was deliberately avoiding contact with his family.

Cox entered West Point in May 1948 and performed well; academically, he was ranked about 100th of 550. He also took part in extracurricular activities, including West Point's cross-country running team. During his yearling (sophomore) year, Cox was voted his cadet company's (Company B-2) top cadet. Cox was engaged to be married; he and his fiancée, Betty Timmons, planned to wed after his graduation.

== Disappearance ==
At 4:45 pm on Saturday, January 7, 1950, a man telephoned Cox's West Point classmate, Peter C. Hains IV, who was acting as Charge of Quarters in Cadet Company B-2 (part of the North Barracks) and answered incoming calls for company members. Hains later said the caller's "tone was rough and patronizing, almost insulting." After he told the man that Cox was not in his room, the man replied, "Well, look, when he comes in, tell him to come on down here to the hotel. ... Just tell him George called – he'll know who I am. We knew each other in Germany. I'm just up here for a little while, and tell him I'd like to get him a bite to eat." (Note: The caller was referencing West Point's Thayer Hotel, where cadets were allowed to dine with visitors.) Hains later stated he could not be completely certain the name given was "George", as he had answered many phone calls while on duty and that one had not seemed noteworthy at the time; Cox never referred to the man by name.

At 5:30 pm, a man entered Grant Hall—an area where cadets could meet guests—and asked to see Cox. The cadet on duty telephoned Cox to tell him he had a visitor. The cadet later described the visitor as slightly under six feet (1.83 m) tall and weighing around 185 pounds (84 kg). He was fair-haired, had a fair complexion and wore a belted trenchcoat, but no hat. When Cox entered the Hall, he shook hands with the man; the cadet on duty later recalled Cox seemed glad to see him. Cox signed out in the Company B-2 Departure Book, indicating he would have dinner with his visitor at the Thayer Hotel. Cox later admitted to his roommates that they did not dine, but drank from a bottle of whiskey while sitting inside the man's parked car.

Cox returned to Cadet Company B-2, signed in in the Departure Book, took a shower and slept off the effects of the alcohol. As a joke, his roommates photographed him as he slept while slumped over his desk. Later that evening, Cox altered the military time he had written in the Departure Book, changing "1923" to "1823" to make it look as if he had attended the 6:30 pm cadet supper formation. In fact, he had skipped the formation. This detail was not discovered until two years later, when an agent of the U.S. Army Criminal Investigation Command (CID) had the Departure Book examined in a laboratory. If the alteration had been discovered when it was fresh in January 1950, Cox could have been charged with violating the Cadet Honor Code. When tattoo sounded at 10:30 p.m. to indicate that lights should be turned off, Cox woke up, ran to the hallway outside his room and shouted something that his roommates thought sounded like, "Alice!" They asked Cox who Alice was, but he said nothing, lay down on his bed and again fell asleep.

The next morning, before attending the Sunday chapel service, Cox mentioned his visitor to his roommates. Cox said the man was a former U.S. Army Ranger who had served in his unit in Germany. Cox also said the man liked to brag about killing Germans during World War II and had boasted about cutting off their genitalia afterward. Another story George supposedly told Cox was about having gotten a German girl pregnant, and then murdering her to prevent her from having the baby. That afternoon, Cox signed out a second time to meet the man, returning at about 4:30 pm. The following six days passed without incident. Cox mentioned his visitor once to his roommates, remarking that he "hoped he wouldn't have to see the fellow again," which gave them the impression he viewed the man with distaste.

On Saturday, January 14, Cox attended a basketball game between Army and Rutgers University. Afterwards, he was seen talking to a man thought to be "George," although the cadet who saw the two talking gave a description that differed from the description given by the cadet who had seen the stranger in Grant Hall on January 7. According to the eyewitness description from January 14, George was "dark-haired and rough looking." Cox returned to his room and mentioned to a roommate that he was signing out to dine with his visitor again, although he appeared "not apprehensive, just sort of disgusted." The two men left the grounds of the academy and vanished.

== Official investigation ==
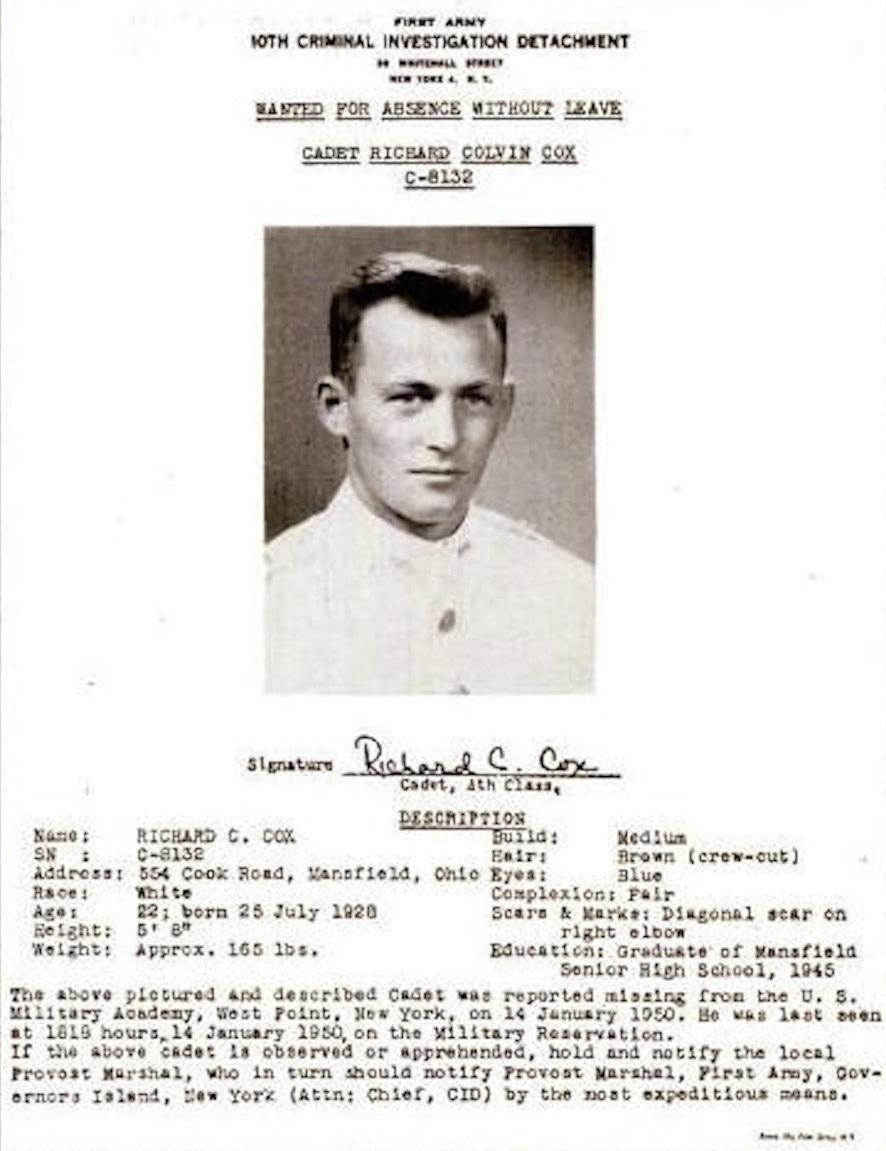
1950 wanted notice published by 10th Criminal Investigation Detachment

Cox was supposed to return by 11:00 pm, but when he did not appear, no alarm was raised because cadets occasionally returned late. His continued absence was reported to a superior officer at 2:30 am, but again no action was taken as cadets had been known to stay out all night despite the punishment this would incur. On Sunday morning, Cox's roommates reported all they knew of the matter to their superior; the New York State Police and the CID were informed. The Federal Bureau of Investigation (FBI) also became involved in the investigation.

Three days after Cox's disappearance, a public appeal for information was broadcast on nearby radio stations. A poster and photos were widely circulated, though the initial photo was low quality and from Cox's time in Germany, not a current photo of him at West Point. (Note: Another photo that was circulated during the search for Cox was actually a photo of Frank Riley Loyd, a classmate who died during the Korean War.) The grounds of West Point were intensively searched by helicopter and by troops on the ground. The Lusk Reservoir was dragged, the banks of the Hudson River were searched and a nearby pond was drained. The manhunt lasted two months but produced no significant leads.

A search of Army records for a soldier who had served with Cox and matched the description of "George" led almost without exception to individuals who could not have been at West Point at the time of the disappearance. Cox's service in Germany was investigated and revealed nothing out of the ordinary. Though he had occasionally written disparagingly of West Point life in letters to his mother and girlfriend, the theory that he had deliberately deserted was discounted, as he had left behind in his room $87 (about $1102 in 2023) and two suits of civilian clothes. (Note: The suits that could have facilitated Cox's departure would normally have been inaccessible, but since cadets had just returned from Christmas break, their civilian clothes had not yet been returned to storage.) On March 15, 1950, Cox was listed as absent without leave.

Based on a West Point psychologist's speculation (without evidence) that two single men meeting several times were probably "homosexualist," the FBI looked into the possibility that Cox was gay or bisexual. This inquiry included visiting gay bars in New York City with Cox's roommates to see if they could identify anyone as "George" or if any patrons recognized a photo of Cox. The roommates never saw anyone who fit the description of George, and no one provided reliable information about having seen Cox. Despite these rumors, as well as the third-hand story of a Mansfield store employee who claimed to have caught Cox and another man having sex in the store's basement in 1946, Cox's friends and family discounted questions about his sexual orientation.

== Subsequent sightings ==
According to a 2021 blog post by Mansfield author Timothy Brian McKee, a friend of Cox saw him in Mansfield in 1950 but did not reveal the details until decades later. According to McKee, he had heard about town that Mansfield resident Ursula Margaret Unterwagner had seen Cox. In response to his query, Unterwagner, a high school classmate of Cox, confirmed in 2010 or 2011 that she had seen Cox within a week of his disappearance.

Unterwagner said she was walking on Fourth Street when she saw Cox walking along the nearby railroad tracks and immediately recognized him because of his distinctive gait. She assumed he had just disembarked from a train at nearby Union Station and was walking home. They waved to each other, and Unterwagner intended to speak with him as soon as the passing train, which was between them, had traveled beyond where they stood. By the time the train had left, Cox was out of Unterwagner's sight and she never saw him again. According to McKee, Unterwagner did not widely share her experience out of concern that she might be jeopardizing Cox's life or career if he had gone to work for an intelligence agency. She asked McKee not to reveal the story until after her death, reasoning that if she was dead, Cox probably was too, and so no longer needed her protection. Unterwagner died in 2020, and McKee then revealed her sighting of Cox.

In 1954, Ernest Shotwell, who had joined the United States Coast Guard after leaving the West Point prep school, reported to the FBI that he had encountered Cox at the Washington, D.C. Greyhound Lines bus station in March 1952, two years after his disappearance. Shotwell knew that Cox had been absent from West Point, but when he saw Cox at the bus station, he assumed that Cox was no longer missing. During their conversation at the bus station, Shotwell said Cox claimed to have resigned from West Point and said he was moving to Germany. According to Shotwell, Cox also appeared to be dressed lightly for the cool March weather, causing Shotwell to assume that he could not have walked far and must have been living nearby. Shotwell also said Cox seemed uncomfortable to see him, was vague about his plans and left after only five minutes.

By the late 1950s, the FBI considered the investigation closed, with all leads exhausted and a solution unlikely. Cox's family had him declared legally dead in 1957. Despite the FBI's position that there were no further leads to pursue, it still followed up on occasional tips. One of these was a reported sighting of Cox in 1960, when an FBI informant claimed to have spent time at a bar in Melbourne, Florida, with a man he later identified as Cox. The man called himself R. C. Mansfield and his acquaintances called him "Richard." After talking at the bar for an extended period, "Mansfield" supposedly shared with the informant personal details that matched Cox's and revealed that Cox was his real name. The informant went on to claim that "Mansfield" stated that Fidel Castro's time as leader of Cuba would be "limited", giving rise to the possibility that he was involved in clandestine work for an American intelligence agency. Subsequent investigation failed to uncover further details on "Mansfield".

== Jacobs investigation ==
Harry J. Maihafer's book Oblivion (1996) documents the investigation into Cox's disappearance by retired high school history teacher Marshall Jacobs. Jacobs began his research in 1985, and considered it inconceivable that the mystery had not been solved after thirty-five years. During the ten years between Jacobs beginning his investigation and Maihafer writing the book, the syndicated news program A Current Affair broadcast a segment about the case which featured interviews with Jacobs and Shotwell.

For ten years, Jacobs traveled across the U.S. following up on new leads and revisiting old ones. He interviewed Cox's family, high school friends, military acquaintances and West Point classmates, CIA, FBI and CID agents, including Watergate figure Frank Sturgis, and West Point and Army officials. He researched West Point's archives and the files from the FBI, CIA and CID investigations of Cox's disappearance, to which he gained access under the Freedom of Information Act. Among his findings was that authorities had been remiss when they discounted the theory that Cox had disappeared deliberately. Jacobs came to believe that the presence of $87 in Cox's shared room did not rule out the possibility that his visitor had helped him start a new career with a new identity.

The old leads Jacobs revisited included ones from Mansfield News Journal reporter Jim Underwood, who had written a twelve-installment series on the case in 1982. Underwood had interviewed a high school acquaintance of Cox named Ralph E. Johns, an Army veteran and prosecutor who later served as a judge in Mansfield. Johns told Underwood that while he had not been involved in the original investigation, he and county prosecutor William McKee had frequent contacts with local FBI officials. Johns also told Underwood that when he and former FBI agent Vince Napoli discussed Cox, Napoli said the bureau had once been within twenty-four hours of arresting Cox and he could not understand why his superiors would not let agents pick him up. Johns speculated, perhaps based on Napoli's story, that Cox might have been recruited into secret intelligence work. In the late 1980s, Jacobs interviewed Johns, who confirmed that he had raised with Underwood the possibility of secret government involvement, but said it was his own speculation.

When he was ready to reveal his findings, Jacobs contacted Maihafer with hopes they could collaborate on a book. The resulting work contains a photo section including the snapshot that Cox's roommates took of him on January 7, 1950, as he slept off the effects of the alcohol he had consumed in his visitor's parked car a short time earlier.

== Questions and concerns ==
As detailed by Maihafer, Jacobs was left with several questions and unresolved issues, some of which were contradictory. Among these were:

- The fact that Cox left money, civilian clothes and a prized gold watch in his room indicated he did not plan to leave permanently.
- A letter to Betty that he never finished included a hand drawn face spitting on the words "United States Military Academy." This draft letter also contained passages that suggested Cox was considering leaving West Point because he was unhappy with the regimen.
- Several of Cox's friends and acquaintances said he told them that while in Germany, he had testified at a court-martial or had provided civilian court testimony against an individual charged with murder. Though neither the FBI nor Jacobs had uncovered any evidence of such a proceeding, the fact that Cox told so many people about it raised the possibility that "George" might have been someone seeking revenge against Cox.
- Soon after Cox disappeared, a letter he sent to Rosemary Vogel, a woman he had met in Germany, which included inquiries about Soviet activities in the country, was returned as undeliverable. Vogel was later located in the U.S., where she had moved after marrying an American. She recalled Cox's friend Joseph "Bud" Groner, but did not remember meeting Cox until shown a photo of herself with Groner and Cox. She indicated that she did not know why Cox would have written to her, but Cox's queries about Soviet activity raised the possibility that he was involved in intelligence gathering, or wanted to be.
- John H. Noble, an American living in Germany, was seized by the Soviets in 1945 and imprisoned until 1955. Noble reported that the Soviet Union was holding a prisoner named "Cox" at a camp in Vorkuta, Siberia. The identity of this individual could not be confirmed, but it raised the possibility that Cox could have become involved in espionage or black market activities while serving in Germany.
- The FBI informant who claimed to have met "R. C. Mansfield" provided enough detail for this encounter to have been a credible sighting. In addition, "Mansfield's" anti-Castro remarks less than a year before the Bay of Pigs Invasion again raised the possibility that Cox was involved in clandestine intelligence work.
- Robert W. Frisbee, who had been stationed at Fort Knox at the same time as Cox and who seemed to fit the description of "George," was known to have traded in false IDs in New York City in the 1950s, something Cox might need if he had disappeared intentionally. Frisbee was arrested for the 1985 murder of socialite Muriel Barnett aboard a cruise ship and imprisoned in Canada, but disclaimed any knowledge of or involvement with Cox.

== Possible conclusion ==
Although Jacobs did not definitively solve Cox's disappearance, he did develop what he considered to be a plausible explanation. He concluded "George" was David M. Westervelt, a New Jersey resident and soldier with whom Cox served in Germany. (Note: To Jacobs and Maihafer, the fact that Westervelt was from northern New Jersey, within easy driving distance of West Point, explained why investigators found no evidence of "George" staying at the Thayer Hotel or any other hotels or motels local to West Point. It also explained "George's" comment to Hains that he was "up here" at West Point, since West Point is north of New Jersey.) Westervelt fit the physical description provided by Cox's classmates and had a dubious career that caused police to interview him several times about Cox's disappearance. Jacobs suspected, as did Groner, that Westervelt was a recruiter for the CIA, a possibility that Westervelt's family did not discount. Jacobs believed that Cox admitted unhappiness with West Point during "George's" (Westervelt's) first visit, and that during subsequent visits Westervelt offered Cox a way out by helping him start a new life under a different name and a career with the CIA or another intelligence agency.

According to an account provided to Jacobs in the mid-1990s by a retired CIA official he did not name, Cox became part of a "stay-behind" team in Europe and spent his career smuggling nuclear scientists and other high-priority individuals out of the Soviet Union and other Eastern Bloc countries. This official further claimed Cox had retired to northern Idaho, but that at the time of the official's interview with Jacobs, he was hospitalized with a terminal illness at the National Institutes of Health facility in Bethesda, Maryland.

== Underwood series ==
- "Richard Cox Tale Baffling Mystery". Mansfield News Journal. Mansfield, OH. 1 August 1982. pp. 1, 5 – via Newspapers.com.
- "Cox remembered as bright student, 'prankster'". 1 August 1982. p. 5.
- "Initial leads exhausted without finding any good clue". 2 August 1982. pp. 1, 10.
- "Evidence shows Cox was toying with idea of quitting academy". 3 August 1982. p. 3.
- "Cox letter leads FBI on long search for German woman". 4 August 1982. p. 3.
- "Abundance of clues only led FBI agents to dead ends". 5 August 1982. p. 3.
- "Search for 'mystery man' leads to suspect with alibi". 6 August 1982. p. 3.
- "Prep school friend tells of running into Cox in 1952". 7 August 1982. p. 3.
- "Reliable informant meets man claiming to be Cox in 1960". 8 August 1982. p. 3.
- "Cox's lifestyle poses as many questions as sudden disappearance". 9 August 1982. p. 3.
- "Some link cadet to intelligence work". 10 August 1982. p. 3.
- "Investigators unable to uncover motive". 11 August 1982. p. 3.
- "Cox file officially closed, but memories linger on". 12 August 1982. p. 3.

== See also ==
- List of people who disappeared
