= Leigh White =

American author and journalist

- Born: James Leigh White; November 9, 1914; St. Albans, Vermont, United States
- Died: May 20, 1968 (aged 53); Storrs, Connecticut, United States
- Occupations: author, journalist
- Known for: covering foreign topics
- Notable work: I Was Stalin's Prisoner

James Leigh White (professionally known as Leigh White) (November 9, 1914 – May 20, 1968) was an American author and journalist who primarily covered foreign topics.

White was born in St. Albans, Vermont, and was a student at Washington University in St. Louis from 1931 to 1934. He worked for newspapers and press outlets including the New York Post, Reuters, London Daily Express, New York Herald Tribune, Overseas News Agency, CBS News, Chicago Daily News, and Minneapolis Tribune.

He published the book I Was Stalin's Prisoner in 1952 with Robert A. Vogeler, an American who was held captive for 17 months in Hungary, which was also serialized in The Saturday Evening Post. He also co-wrote Egypt's Destiny with Mohamed Naguib, the first President of Egypt, among other books.

White was found dead at his home in Storrs, Connecticut, where he had been a lecturer at the University of Connecticut, on May 20, 1968. He was survived by his wife.
