= Barry Appleby =

British cartoonist

- Born: 30 August 1909
- Died: 11 March 1996 (aged 86)
- Area: Cartoonist
- Notable works: The Gambols

Barry Appleby (30 August 1909 – 11 March 1996) was a British cartoonist famous for creating The Gambols for the Daily Express. The strip premiered on 16 March 1950. The script was written by his wife Dobs, and was based on their own lives.

Appleby's father, E J. Appleby, was in the 1940s the editor of Autocar, a leading British motor magazine, and one to which Appleby himself contributed his first illustration in 1931. Later Appleby also wrote for the magazine edited by his father, using the alias "Helix". In later years he lived in Castle Cary, Somerset.
