= The Gambols =

British comic strip appearing since 1950

- Author: Roger Mahoney
- Illustrator: Barry Appleby
- Publisher: Mail on Sunday

The Gambols is a British comic strip created by Barry Appleby which debuted 16 March 1950 in the Daily Express where it ran for almost 50 years: as of 1999 The Gambols has appeared in The Mail on Sunday.

From The Gambols' inception, Appleby received input into creating the strips from his journalist wife Doris "Dobs" Appleby - she suggested "Gambol" as the surname of the married couple who are the strip's focus - and from the 1960s Dobs Appleby received official credit for co-writing The Gambols. Social historian David Kynaston has opined that "the Gambols [inhabit] a frozen-in-time world closely mirroring the Applebys' own in Kingston-upon-Thames Surrey in the early 1950s".

The two central characters are George and Gaye Gambol, a happily married, suburban, middle class couple. George is the main breadwinner working as a salesman while Gaye is primarily a housewife, but she does occasionally take on part-time office jobs. The stories revolve around the Gambols' everyday life, in particular Gaye's passion for shopping and George's attempts at home improvements. The couple is childless but, at least once a year, they have their non-sibling nephew and niece: Flivver and Miggy, stay with them.

Originally The Gambols appeared three times a week formatted as a strip of three or four panels, and three times in single panel format. As of 4 June 1951 - when paper rationing officially ended - The Gambols was featured daily in multi-panel format, and as of 1956 an extended three row strip was prepped for the Sunday Express. Some of the strips also appeared in colour.

After Dobs's death in 1985, Barry Appleby continued with the strip alone until his own death in 1996. The strip was then taken over by Appleby's longtime associate Roger Mahoney. In November 1999 the Express canceled The Gambols with the Express running an intended final strip showing George and Gaye - along with Flivver and Miggy - evidently preparing to journey on in the family car. However the strip was picked up as of December 1999 by the Mail on Sunday for whom Mahoney has been drawing The Gambols ever since.
