= Kenneth Street Jr. =

American chemist

Kenneth Street Jr. (1920 – 13 March 2006) was an American chemist. He was part of the team that discovered elements 97 and 98 (berkelium and californium) in 1949 and 1950.

Street was born in 1920 in Berkeley, California. He obtained his degree in chemistry in 1943 from the University of California, Berkeley. He then served in World War II as a fighter pilot, with his awards including the Air Medal and the Distinguished Flying Cross. After the war, he returned to Berkeley, obtaining his PhD in nuclear chemistry in 1949, with a thesis titled 'Isotopes of americium and curium'.

The work on berkelium and californium was carried out at the Lawrence Radiation Laboratory (now part of the Lawrence Berkeley National Laboratory) with Stanley G. Thompson, Glenn T. Seaborg and Albert Ghiorso. Street joined the faculty at Berkeley in 1949, and became deputy director of the Lawrence Radiation Laboratory, and later a professor of chemistry. His specialities and interests were in the areas of nuclear chemistry, geochemistry and geothermal energy.

Street retired in 1986, and moved to Taylorsville, California in 1997 with his wife Jane (née Armitage). They had married in 1944 and had three children, two sons and a daughter. Street's interests included walking in the mountains, backpacking and sailing. Street died on 13 March 2006, in Paradise, California.
