= Stanley Gerald Thompson =

American chemist (1912–1976)

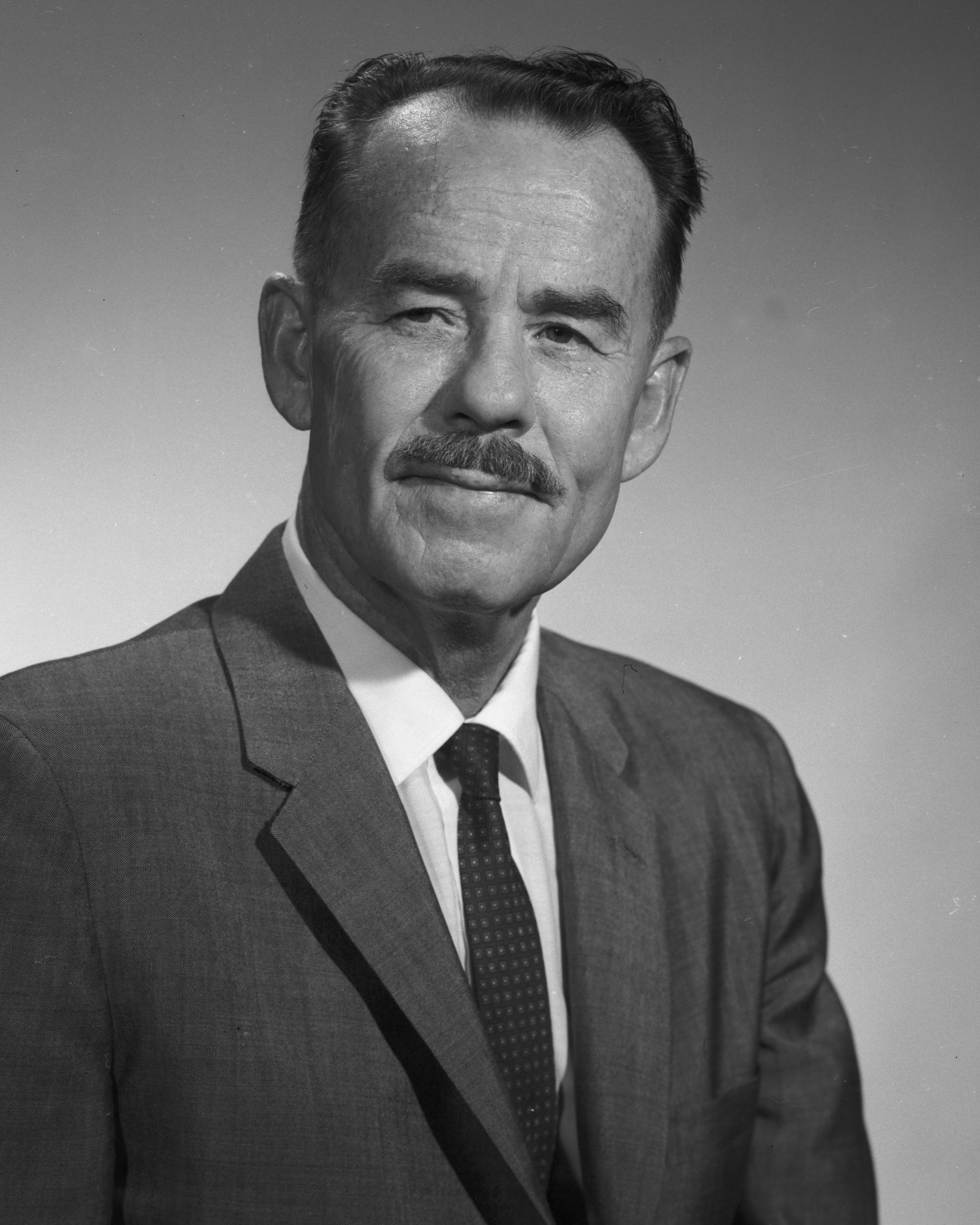
- Thompson in 1964
- Born: 1912
- Died: 1976 (aged 63–64)

Stanley Gerald Thompson (1912–1976) was an American chemist. He discovered together with Glenn T. Seaborg several of the transuranium elements. One of the elements is Californium, which he and several others made. Thompson was also a leader of the research teams that discovered the next three transuranium elements: einsteinium, fermium and mendelevium (atomic numbers 99, 100 and 101). He received Guggenheim Fellowships (Natural Sciences - Chemistry) in 1954 and 1965.
