= List of centenarians (engineers, mathematicians and scientists) =

The following is a list of centenarians – specifically, people who became famous as scientists and mathematicians – known for reasons other than their longevity. For more lists, see lists of centenarians.

All supercentenarians (above 110 years old)
Living

Name	Lifespan	Age	Reason for Notability
Charles Greeley Abbot	1872–1973	101	American astrophysicist and the fifth secretary of the Smithsonian Institution
Fred Aftalion	1922–2022	100	French chemical engineer
Shmuel Agmon	1922–2025	103	Israeli mathematician
Saleh Ajeery	1920–2022	101	Kuwaiti astronomer
Horace Alexander	1889–1989	100	British biologist and ornithologist
Doris Twitchell Allen	1901–2002	100	American psychologist and founder of Children's International Summer Villages
Franz Alt	1910–2011	100	Austrian mathematician
Heinz Ansbacher	1904–2006	101	German-American psychologist
Guacolda Antoine Lazzerini	1908–2015	107	Chilean mathematician and educator
Rudolf Arnheim	1904–2007	102	German psychologist of visual perception
David Attenborough	1926–	100	English broadcaster, natural historian, conservationist, writer, producer and narrator
Ira Baldwin	1895–1999	103	American bacteriologist and educator
Basil Balme	1923–2023	100	Australian palynologist
David Bannett	1921–2022	100	Israeli-American electrical engineer
Paddy Bassett	1918–2019	101	New Zealand agricultural scientist
Preston Bassett	1892–1992	100	American inventor and aeronautics pioneer
Henry Beachell	1906–2006	100	American developer of "miracle rice"
Wilfried de Beauclair	1912–2020	108	Swiss-born German engineer and computer scientist
Arnold Orville Beckman	1900–2004	104	American chemist and businessman who founded Beckman Instruments
Bei Shizhang	1903–2009	106	Chinese biologist and educator
Julia Bell	1879–1979	100	British human geneticist
Harry Benjamin	1885–1986	101	German sexologist
Leo Beranek	1914–2016	102	American acoustical scientist
Theodor Bergmann	1916–2017	101	German agronomist and author
Bob Berry	1916–2018	102	New Zealand dendrologist
Adam Bielański	1912–2016	103	Polish chemist
Sidney W. Bijou	1908–2009	100	American child psychologist
Heinz Billing	1914–2017	102	German physicist and computer scientist
Marcel Boiteux	1922–2023	101	French economist
William M. Boothby	1918–2021	102	American mathematician
Winnett Boyd	1916–2017	100	Canadian engineer
Per Vilhelm Brüel	1915–2015	100	Danish physicist and engineer
Yvonne Choquet-Bruhat	1923–2025	101	French mathematician and physicist
Boris Yakovlevich Bukreev	1859–1962	103	Ukrainian mathematician
Margaret Burbidge	1919–2020	100	British-American astrophysicist
Colin Gasking Butler	1913–2016	102	British entomologist
Cai Qirui	1914–2016	102	Chinese chemist
Eugenio Calabi	1923–2023	100	Italian-American mathematician
Pierre Camu	1923–2023	100	Canadian geographer and civil servant
Beatrice de Cardi	1914–2016	102	British archaeologist
Henri Cartan	1904–2008	104	French mathematician
Hung-ta Chang	1914–2016	101	Chinese botanist and ecologist
Chen Jingxiong	1921–2022	100	Chinese engineer
Cheng Kaijia	1918–2018	100	Chinese nuclear physicist and engineer
Herman Chernoff	1923–2026	103	American mathematician
Georgy Chernov	1906–2009	102	Russian geologist
Michel Eugène Chevreul	1786–1889	102	French chemist
Dame Harriette Chick	1875–1977	102	British microbiologist, protein scientist and nutritionist
Sir Rickard Christophers	1873–1978	104	British protozoologist
Muazzez İlmiye Çığ	1914–2024	110	Turkish archaeologist
Thomas H. Clark	1893–1996	102	Canadian geologist
Seymour S. Cohen	1917–2018	101	American biochemist
H. Basil S. Cooke	1915–2018	102	Canadian geologist and paleontologist
William D. Coolidge	1873–1975	101	American engineer and developer of the Coolidge tube for production of x-rays
Morton Coutts	1904–2004	100	New Zealand inventor and developer of the continuous fermentation method
Ray Crist	1900–2005	105	American chemist
Kathleen Curtis	1892−1994	102	New Zealand mycologist and first female Fellow of the Royal Society of New Zealand
Max Day	1915–2017	101	Australian ecologist
Sukh Dev	1923–2024	101	Indian organic chemist
Theodor Otto Diener	1921–2023	102	Swiss-American plant pathologist, discoverer of viroids
Jacques Dixmier	1924–	102	French mathematician
Nikolay Dollezhal	1899–2000	101	Russian mechanical engineer
Sergio Donadoni	1914–2015	101	Italian archaeologist
William Gould Dow	1895–1999	104	American scientist and inventor
Marion Downs	1914–2014	100	American audiologist
Alicia Dussán de Reichel	1920–2023	102	Colombian anthropologist
Dan Eley	1914–2015	100	British chemist
Frank Ellis	1905–2006	100	British radiologist
Rica Erickson	1908–2009	101	Australian naturalist
Leo Esaki	1925–	101	Japanese physicist and recipient of the 1973 Nobel Prize in Physics
Henri Fabre	1882–1984	101	French aviation pioneer and inventor
D. J. Finney	1917–2018	101	British statistician
Sir Raymond Firth	1901–2002	100	New Zealand anthropologist
Edmond H. Fischer	1920–2021	101	American biochemist and recipient of the 1992 Nobel Prize in Physiology or Medicine
Ron Fitch	1910–2015	105	Australian railroad engineer and executive
Yves Oscar Fortier	1914–2014	100	Canadian geologist
John S. Foster Jr.	1922–2025	102	American physicist
Ronald Martin Foster	1896–1998	101	American engineer
Henry Jacques Gaisman	1869–1974	104	American philanthropist and inventor
Mohammad Hassan Ganji	1912–2012	100	Iranian meteorologist
Augusto Gansser-Biaggi	1910–2012	101	Swiss geologist
Theodore H. Geballe	1920–2021	101	American physicist
Oliver Holmes Gish	1883–1987	103	American geophysicist
Maria Glazovskaya	1912–2016	104	Russian soil scientist
Salome Gluecksohn-Waelsch	1907–2007	100	German-American geneticist
Arthur Goddard	1921–2022	101	English-Australian engineer
Maurice Goldhaber	1911–2011	100	American nuclear physicist
David W. Goodall	1914–2018	104	Australian botanist and ecologist
John B. Goodenough	1922–2023	100	German-American physicist and recipient of the 2019 Nobel Prize in Chemistry
Richard M. Goody	1921–2023	102	British-American atmospheric physicist
Dieter Grau	1913–2014	101	German rocket scientist
Vilmosné Gryllus	1924–2024	100	Hungarian chemist
Jean-Michel Guilcher	1914–2017	102	French ethnologist
Richard K. Guy	1916–2020	103	British mathematician
Bill Haast	1910–2011	100	American director of the Miami Serpentarium
Viktor Hamburger	1900–2001	100	German professor and embryologist
Alice Hamilton	1869–1970	101	American toxicologist
Michael Heidelberger	1888–1991	103	American immunologist
Rudolf Hell	1901–2002	100	German inventor
Joel Henry Hildebrand	1881–1983	101	American chemist
Polly Hill	1907–2007	100	American horticulturist
Arthur R. von Hippel	1898–2003	105	German-American physicist and co-developer of radar
Dorrit Hoffleit	1907–2007	100	American research astronomer
Albert Hofmann	1906–2008	102	Swiss discoverer of LSD
Bernard Holden	1908–2012	104	British railway engineer
Philip Hollom	1912–2014	102	British ornithologist
Hu Chengzhi	1917–2018	100	Chinese paleontologist and paleoanthropologist; discoverer of Keichousaurus
Holly Hu	1910–2012	102	Chinese botanist
Friedrich Hund	1896–1997	101	German physicist
Harry Huskey	1916–2017	101	American computer designer
Kees de Jager	1921–2021	100	Dutch astronomer
Katherine Johnson	1918–2020	101	American mathematician, physicist and NASA employee
Robert L. Kahn	1918–2019	100	American social psychologist
Alex Karczmar	1917–2017	100	American neuroscientist
Ke Jun	1917–2017	100	Chinese metallurgist
Ora Kedem	1924–2026	101	Israeli chemist
Frances Oldham Kelsey	1914–2015	101	Canadian-American pharmacologist and physician
Ancel Keys	1904–2004	100	American biologist
Isaak Khalatnikov	1919–2021	101	Soviet and Russian physicist
Barys Kit	1910–2018	107	Belarusian scientist
Charles Kittel	1916–2019	102	American theoretical solid-state physicist.
Nathaniel Kleitman	1895–1999	104	American sleep researcher
Paul E. Klopsteg	1889–1991	101	American physicist
Jacob Korevaar	1923–2025	102	Dutch mathematician
Frank L. Lambert	1918–2018	100	American chemist
Stanley Leavy	1915–2016	101	American psychoanalyst
Shih-Ying Lee	1918–2018	100	American engineer, physicist and inventor
Jerome F. Lederer	1902–2004	101	American engineer
Inge Lehmann	1888–1993	104	Danish seismologist
Emma Lehmer	1906–2007	100	Russian-American mathematician
Rita Levi-Montalcini	1909–2012	103	Italian neurologist, recipient of the 1986 Nobel Prize in Physiology or Medicine and senator
Paul A. Libby	1921–2021	100	American fluid dynamicist
Edward J. Lofgren	1914–2016	102	American physicist
James Lovelock	1919–2022	103	British chemist
Lu Yuanjiu	1920–2023	103	Chinese physicist, member of the Chinese Academy of Sciences and Engineering
August Luebs	1889–1989	100	American mechanical engineer
John Walter Guerrier Lund	1912–2015	102	British phycologist
James Ross MacDonald	1923–2024	101	American physicist
Amaro Macedo	1914–2014	100	Brazilian botanist
Karl Maramorosch	1915–2016	101	Austrian-born American virologist
Rudolph A. Marcus	1923–2026	102	Canadian-American chemist and recipient of the 1992 Prize in Chemistry
Héctor Mayagoitia Domínguez	1923–2023	100	Mexican chemical bacteriologist and politician
Harris Mayer	1921–2023	102	American physicist (Manhattan Project)
Ernst Mayr	1904–2005	100	German-American biologist
John J. McKetta	1915–2019	103	American chemical engineer
Brockway McMillan	1915–2016	101	American government official and scientist; Director of the National Reconnaissance Office (1963–1965)
Rogers McVaugh	1909–2009	100	American botanist and educator
Wilhelm Meise	1901–2002	101	German ornithologist
Foil A. Miller	1916–2016	100	American chemist
William F. Milliken Jr.	1911–2012	101	American aerospace engineer and racing driver
Victor Mills	1897–1997	100	American chemical engineer
Brenda Milner	1918–	108	Canadian neuroscientist
Beatrice Mintz	1921–2022	100	American embryologist
Russell L. Mixter	1906–2007	100	American biologist
Ralph S. Moore	1907–2009	102	American horticulturalist
Walter Munk	1917–2019	101	American physical oceanographer
Margaret Murray	1863–1963	100	British anthropologist
Nellie May Naylor	1885–1992	107	American chemistry professor
Sterling Newberry	1915–2017	101	American microscopist
Sergey Nikolsky	1905–2012	107	Russian mathematician
Georg Nöbeling	1907–2008	100	German mathematician
Dame Kathleen Ollerenshaw	1912–2014	101	British mathematician
Antoni Opolski	1913–2014	100	Polish physicist
Nicanor Parra	1914–2018	103	Chilean mathematician, physicist and poet
Borys Paton	1918–2020	101	Ukrainian metallurgist, chairman of the National Academy of Sciences of Ukraine since 1962
Ruth Patrick	1907–2013	105	American limnologist
Ralph Pearson	1919–2022	103	American chemist (HSAB theory)
Luboš Perek	1919–2020	101	Czech astronomer
Luigi Poletti	1864–1967	103	Italian mathematician
Pelageia Yakovlevna Polubarinova Kochina	1899–1999	100	Russian mathematician
Martin Pope	1918–2022	103	American chemist and educator
G. Baley Price	1905–2006	101	American mathematician
Maria Matilde Principi	1915–2017	102	Italian entomologist
Elsie Quarterman	1910–2014	103	American plant ecologist
Simon Ramo	1913–2016	103	American physicist
C. R. Rao	1920–2023	102	Indian-American statistician
Karl Rawer	1913–2018	104	German physicist
Ren Xinmin	1915–2017	101	Chinese rocket scientist
Malcolm Renfrew	1910–2013	103	American chemist
Robert Hallowell Richards	1844–1945	100	American metallurgist
Henry Nicholas Ridley	1855–1956	100	British biologist
George Rosenkranz	1916–2019	102	Hungarian-born Mexican steroid chemist
Nancy Sandars	1914–2015	101	British archaeologist and prehistorian
Tadashi Sasaki	1915–2018	102	Japanese engineer
Victor Blanchard Scheffer	1906–2011	104	American zoologist and author
Helmut Schlesinger	1924–2024	100	German economist
Waldo Semon	1898–1999	100	American chemist
Jean-Pierre Serre	1926–	100	French mathematician
Shen Panwen	1916–2017	100	Chinese chemist
Shen Shanjiong	1917–2021	103	Chinese microbiologist and geneticist
Shen Qihan	1922–2022	100	Chinese geologist, member of the Chinese Academy of Sciences
Sharadchandra Shankar Shrikhande	1917–2020	102	Indian mathematician
David Shugar	1915–2015	100	Polish-Canadian physicist
Louis Siminovitch	1920–2021	100	Canadian molecular biologist
Robert Simpson	1912–2014	102	American meteorologist
Hobart Muir Smith	1912–2013	100	American herpetologist
Ralph Solecki	1917–2019	101	American archaeologist
Esther Somerfeld-Ziskind	1901–2002	101	American psychiatry researcher
Arnold Spielberg	1917–2020	103	American electrical engineer
Jeremiah Stamler	1919–2022	102	American scientist
Epaminondas Stassinopoulos	1921–2022	101	German-born American astrophysicist
Gerolf Steiner	1908–2009	101	German professor of zoology
Clarence F. Stephens	1917–2018	100	American mathematician
Ralph Randles Stewart	1890–1993	103	American botanist
Dirk Jan Struik	1894–2000	106	Dutch-born American mathematician
Su Buqing (aka Su Bu-Chin)	1902–2003	101	Chinese mathematician, educator and poet
F. William Sunderman	1898–2003	104	American physician and scientist
Igal Talmi	1925–2026	101	Israeli physicist
Ralph Tambs Lyche	1890–1991	100	Norwegian mathematician
Tang Youqi	1920–2022	102	Chinese physical chemist, member of the Chinese Academy of Sciences
Wilmer W. Tanner	1909–2011	101	American zoologist
Harold Neville Vazeille Temperley	1915–2017	102	British mathematician
John Kenneth Terres	1905–2006	100	American naturalist and author
Lise Thiry	1921–2024	102	Belgian scientist and politician
Dorothy Burr Thompson	1900–2001	100	American classical archaeologist and art historian
Peter Thonemann	1917–2018	100	Australian-born British physicist
Bryan Thwaites	1923–	102	English mathematician
Georg von Tiesenhausen	1914–2018	104	German-American rocket scientist
Germaine Tillion	1907–2008	100	French anthropologist
Constance Tipper	1894–1995	101	British metallurgist and crystallographer
László Tisza	1907–2009	101	Hungarian-American physicist
Graham Turbott	1914–2014	100	New Zealand ornithologist and zoologist
Victor Vacquier	1907–2009	101	Russian-American geophysicist
Joan Henri van der Waals	1920–2022	102	Dutch physicist
Ruth van Heyningen	1917–2019	102	British biochemist
Gordon John Van Wylen	1920–2020	100	American physicist and textbook author
Leopold Vietoris	1891–2002	110	Austrian mathematician
Sir Mokshagundam Visvesvaraya	1861–1962	100	Indian engineer
Marthe Vogt	1903–2003	100	German-English neuroscientist
Wang Xiji	1921–2026	105	Chinese aerospace engineer
Sir Frederick Warner	1910–2010	100	British chemical engineer
Torsten Wiesel	1924–	102	Swedish neuroscientist and recipient of the 1981 Nobel Prize in Physiology or Medicine
Louis Witten	1921–	105	American theoretical physicist
Floyd R. Watson	1872–1974	101	American physicist and acoustician
Walter Francis Willcox	1861–1964	103	American statistician
Evelyn M. Witkin	1921–2023	102	American geneticist
Xu Xurong	1922–2022	100	Chinese physicist, member of the Chinese Academy of Sciences
Yang Chen-Ning	1922–2025	103	Chinese theoretical physicist and recipient of the 1957 Nobel Prize in Physics
Filippo Zappata	1894–1994	100	Italian aircraft designer and pioneer
Zhang Guangdou	1912–2013	101	Chinese engineer
Zhang Tianfu	1910–2017	106	Chinese agronomist and tea expert
Zhang Xingqian	1921–2022	100	Chinese metal physicist, member of the Chinese Academy of Sciences
Zheng Ji	1900–2010	110	Chinese nutritionist and biochemist
Zhuang Qiaosheng	1916–2022	105	Chinese plant geneticist
