= Albert Ghiorso =

American nuclear scientist (1915–2010)

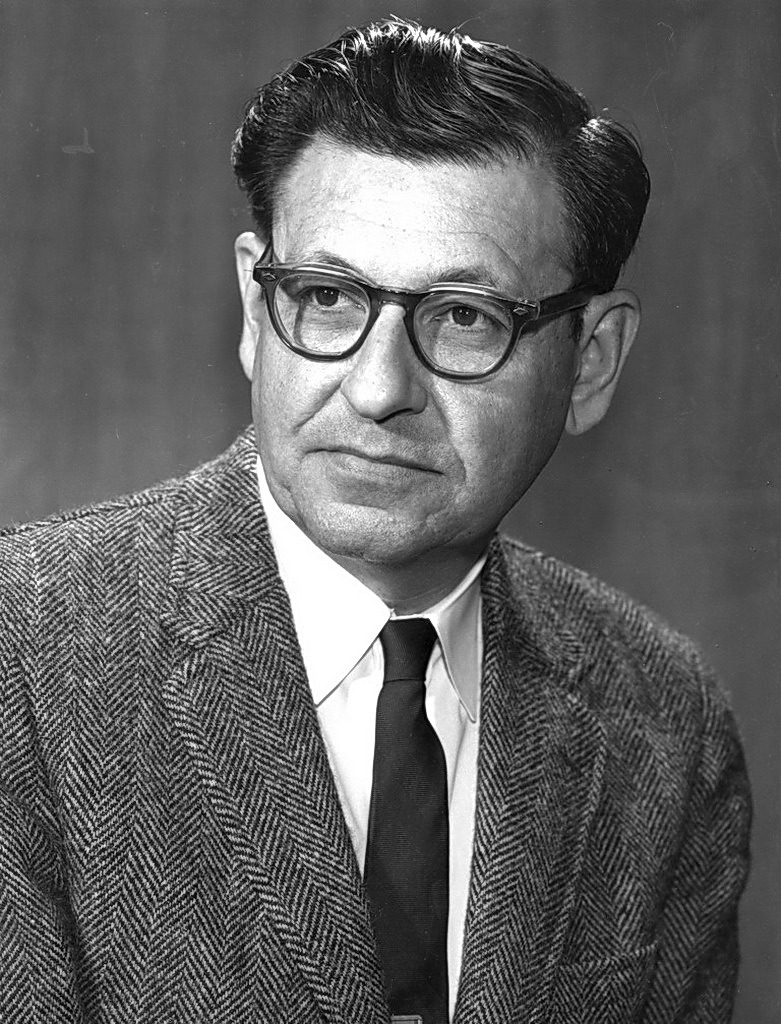
- Ghiorso, c. 1970
- Born: July 15, 1915; Vallejo, California, U.S.
- Died: December 26, 2010 (aged 95); Berkeley, California, U.S.
- Known for: Chemical element discoveries
- Awards: 2004 Lifetime Achievement Award (Radiochemistry Society), The Potts Medal (Franklin Institute), G. D. Searle and Co. Award (American Chemical Society), Honorary Doctorate (Gustavus Adolphus College), Fellow (American Academy of Arts and Sciences), Fellow (American Physical Society), Guinness Book of World Records (Most Elements Discovered)
- Scientific career
- Fields: Nuclear science
- Workplaces: Lawrence Berkeley National Laboratory

Albert Ghiorso (July 15, 1915 – December 26, 2010) was an American nuclear scientist and co-discoverer of a record 12 chemical elements on the periodic table. His research career spanned six decades, from the early 1940s to the late 1990s.

== Biography ==
=== Early life ===
Ghiorso was born in Vallejo, California on July 15, 1915, of Italian and Spanish ancestry. He grew up in Alameda, California. Living near the Oakland International Airport, he became interested in airplanes, aeronautics, and other technologies. After graduating from high school, he built radio circuitry and earned a reputation for establishing radio contacts at distances that outdid the military.

He received his BS in electrical engineering from the University of California, Berkeley in 1937. After graduation, he worked for Reginald Tibbets, a prominent amateur radio operator who operated a business supplying radiation detectors to the government. Ghiorso's ability to develop and produce these instruments, as well as a variety of electronic tasks, brought him into contact with the nuclear scientists at the University of California Radiation Laboratory at Berkeley, in particular Glenn Seaborg. During a job in which he was to install an intercom at the lab, he met two secretaries, one of whom, Helen Griggs, married Seaborg. The other, Wilma Belt, became Albert's wife of 60+ years.

=== Religion ===
Ghiorso was raised in a devout Christian family, but later left the religion and became an atheist. However, he still identified with Christian ethics.

=== Wartime research ===
In the early 1940s, Seaborg moved to Chicago to work on the Manhattan Project. He invited Ghiorso to join him, and for the next four years Ghiorso developed sensitive instruments for detecting the radiation associated with nuclear decay, including spontaneous fission. One of Ghiorso's breakthrough instruments was a 48-channel pulse height analyzer, which enabled him to identify the energy, and therefore the source, of the radiation. During this time they discovered two new elements (95, americium and 96, curium), although publication was withheld until after the war.

=== New elements ===
After the war, Seaborg and Ghiorso returned to Berkeley, where they and colleagues used the 60" Crocker cyclotron to produce elements of increasing atomic number by bombarding exotic targets with helium ions. In experiments during 1949–1950, they produced and identified elements 97 (berkelium) and 98 (californium). In 1953, in a collaboration with Argonne Lab, Ghiorso and collaborators sought and found elements 99 (einsteinium) and 100 (fermium), identified by their characteristic radiation in dust collected by airplanes from the first thermonuclear explosion (the Mike test). In 1955, the group used the cyclotron to produce 17 atoms of element 101 (mendelevium), the first new element to be discovered atom-by-atom. The recoil technique invented by Ghiorso was crucial to obtaining an identifiable signal from individual atoms of the new element.

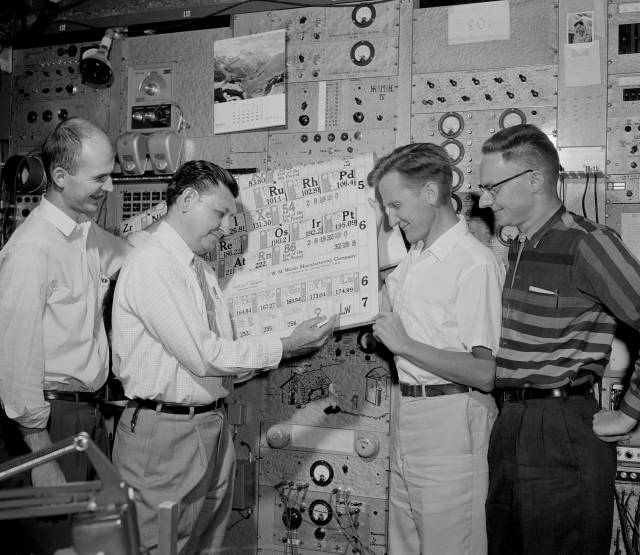
Ghiorso updates a periodic table in 1961 with the newly discovered element lawrencium while co-discoverers Robert Latimer, Torbjorn Sikkeland and Almon Larsh look on.

In the mid-1950s it became clear that to extend the periodic chart any further, a new accelerator would be needed, and the Berkeley Heavy Ion Linear Accelerator (HILAC) was built, with Ghiorso in charge. That machine was used in the discovery of elements 102–106 (102, nobelium; 103, lawrencium; 104, rutherfordium; 105, dubnium and 106, seaborgium), each produced and identified on the basis of only a few atoms. The discovery of each successive element was made possible by the development of innovative techniques in robotic target handling, fast chemistry, efficient radiation detectors, and computer data processing. The 1972 upgrade of the HILAC to the superHILAC provided higher intensity ion beams, which was crucial to producing enough new atoms to enable detection of element 106.

With increasing atomic number, the experimental difficulties of producing and identifying a new element increase significantly. In the 1970s and 1980s, resources for new element research at Berkeley were diminishing, but the GSI laboratory at Darmstadt, Germany, under the leadership of Peter Armbruster and with considerable resources, was able to produce and identify elements 107–109 (107, bohrium; 108, hassium and 109, meitnerium). In the early 1990s, the Berkeley and Darmstadt groups made a collaborative attempt to create element 110. Experiments at Berkeley were unsuccessful, but eventually elements 110–112 (110, darmstadtium; 111, roentgenium and 112, copernicium) were identified at the Darmstadt laboratory. Subsequent work at the JINR laboratory at Dubna, led by Yuri Oganessian and a Russian-American team of scientists, was successful in identifying elements 113–118 (113, nihonium; 114, flerovium; 115, moscovium; 116, livermorium; 117, tennessine and 118, oganesson), thereby completing the Period 7 elements of the periodic table of the elements.

=== Inventions ===
Ghiorso invented numerous techniques and machines for isolating and identifying heavy elements atom-by-atom. He is generally credited with implementing the multichannel analyzer and the technique of recoil to isolate reaction products, although both of these were significant extensions of previously understood concepts. His concept for a new type of accelerator, the Omnitron, is acknowledged to have been a brilliant advance that probably would have enabled the Berkeley lab to discover numerous additional new elements, but the machine was never built, a victim of the evolving political landscape of the 1970s in the U.S. that de-emphasized basic nuclear research and greatly expanded research on environmental, health, and safety issues. Partially as a result of the failure to build the Omnitron, Ghiorso (together with colleagues Bob Main and others) conceived the joining of the HILAC and the Bevatron, which he called the Bevalac. This combination machine, an ungainly articulation across the steep slope at the Rad Lab, provided heavy ions at GeV energies, thereby enabling development of two new fields of research: "high-energy nuclear physics," meaning that the compound nucleus is sufficiently hot to exhibit collective dynamical effects, and heavy ion therapy, in which high-energy ions are used to irradiate tumors in cancer patients. Both of these fields have expanded into activities in many laboratories and clinics worldwide.

=== Later life ===
In his later years, Ghiorso continued research toward finding superheavy elements, fusion energy, and innovative electron beam sources. He was a non-participating co-author of the experiments in 1999 that gave evidence of elements 116 and 118, which later turned out to be a case of scientific fraud perpetrated by the first author, Victor Ninov. He also had brief research interests in the free quark experiment of William Fairbank of Stanford, in the discovery of element 43, and in the electron disk accelerator, among others.

=== Legacy ===
Albert Ghiorso is credited with having co-discovered the following elements:

- Americium ca. 1945 (element 95)
- Curium in 1944 (element 96)
- Berkelium in 1949 (element 97)
- Californium in 1950 (element 98)
- Einsteinium in 1952 (element 99)
- Fermium in 1953 (element 100)
- Mendelevium in 1955 (element 101)
- Nobelium in 1958–59 (element 102)
- Lawrencium in 1961 (element 103)
- Rutherfordium in 1969 (element 104)
- Dubnium in 1970 (element 105)
- Seaborgium in 1974 (element 106)

Ghiorso personally selected some of the names recommended by his group for the new elements. His original name for element 105 (hahnium) was changed by the International Union of Pure and Applied Chemistry (IUPAC) to dubnium, to recognize the contributions of the laboratory at Dubna, Russia, in the search for trans-fermium elements. His recommendation for element 106, seaborgium, was accepted only after extensive debate about naming an element after a living person. In 1999, evidence for two superheavy elements (element 116 and element 118) was published by a group in Berkeley. The discovery group intended to propose the name ghiorsium for element 118, but eventually the data were found to have been tampered and in 2002 the claims were withdrawn. Ghiorso's lifetime output comprised about 170 technical papers, most published in The Physical Review.

Ghiorso was famous among his colleagues for his endless stream of creative "doodles," which define an art form suggestive of fractals. He also developed a state-of-the-art camera for birdwatching, and was a constant supporter of environmental causes and organizations.

Several obituaries are available online, and a full-length biography is in preparation.
