= Nobelium =

Nobelium, _{102}No
Nobelium
- Pronunciation: /noʊˈbiːliəm/ (noh-BEE-lee-əm); /noʊˈbɛliəm/ (noh-BEL-ee-əm)
- Mass number: [259]

Nobelium in the periodic table
| Hydrogen | | | | | | | | | | | | | | | | | | | | | | | | | | | | | | | Helium |
| Lithium | Beryllium | | | | | | | | | | | | | | | | | | | | | | | | | Boron | Carbon | Nitrogen | Oxygen | Fluorine | Neon |
| Sodium | Magnesium | | | | | | | | | | | | | | | | | | | | | | | | | Aluminium | Silicon | Phosphorus | Sulfur | Chlorine | Argon |
| Potassium | Calcium | | | | | | | | | | | | | | | Scandium | Titanium | Vanadium | Chromium | Manganese | Iron | Cobalt | Nickel | Copper | Zinc | Gallium | Germanium | Arsenic | Selenium | Bromine | Krypton |
| Rubidium | Strontium | | | | | | | | | | | | | | | Yttrium | Zirconium | Niobium | Molybdenum | Technetium | Ruthenium | Rhodium | Palladium | Silver | Cadmium | Indium | Tin | Antimony | Tellurium | Iodine | Xenon |
| Caesium | Barium | Lanthanum | Cerium | Praseodymium | Neodymium | Promethium | Samarium | Europium | Gadolinium | Terbium | Dysprosium | Holmium | Erbium | Thulium | Ytterbium | Lutetium | Hafnium | Tantalum | Tungsten | Rhenium | Osmium | Iridium | Platinum | Gold | Mercury (element) | Thallium | Lead | Bismuth | Polonium | Astatine | Radon |
| Francium | Radium | Actinium | Thorium | Protactinium | Uranium | Neptunium | Plutonium | Americium | Curium | Berkelium | Californium | Einsteinium | Fermium | Mendelevium | Nobelium | Lawrencium | Rutherfordium | Dubnium | Seaborgium | Bohrium | Hassium | Meitnerium | Darmstadtium | Roentgenium | Copernicium | Nihonium | Flerovium | Moscovium | Livermorium | Tennessine | Oganesson |
Yb
↑
No
↓
—
mendelevium ← nobelium → lawrencium
- Atomic number (Z): 102
- Group: f-block groups (no number)
- Period: period 7
- Block: f-block
- Electron configuration: [Rn] 5f^{14} 7s^{2}
- Electrons per shell: 2, 8, 18, 32, 32, 8, 2

Physical properties
- Phase at STP: solid (predicted)
- Melting point: 1100 K (800 °C, 1500 °F) (predicted)
- Density (near r.t.): 9.9(4) g/cm^{3} (predicted) (Note: The density is calculated from the predicted metallic radius (Silva 2008, p. 1639) and the predicted close-packed crystal structure (Fournier 1976).)

Atomic properties
- Oxidation states: common: +3 +2
- Electronegativity: Pauling scale: 1.3 (predicted)
- Ionization energies: 1st: 639 kJ/mol; 2nd: 1254.3 kJ/mol; 3rd: 2605.1 kJ/mol; (all but first estimated)
- Covalent radius: 176 pm (single-bond)
- Van der Waals radius: 246 pm

Other properties
- Natural occurrence: synthetic
- Crystal structure: face-centered cubic (fcc) (predicted)
- CAS Number: 10028-14-5

History
- Naming: after Alfred Nobel
- Discovery: Joint Institute for Nuclear Research (1965)

Isotopes of nobelium
| Main isotopes | | | Decay | |
| Isotope | abundance | half-life (t_{1/2}) | mode | product |
|---|---|---|---|---|
| ^{253}No | synth | 1.6 min | α55% | ^{249}Fm |
| ^{253}No | synth | 1.6 min | β^{+}45% | ^{253}Md |
| ^{254}No | synth | 51 s | α90% | ^{250}Fm |
| ^{254}No | synth | 51 s | β^{+}10% | ^{254}Md |
| ^{255}No | synth | 3.5 min | α61% | ^{251}Fm |
| ^{255}No | synth | 3.5 min | β^{+}39% | ^{255}Md |
| ^{257}No | synth | 25 s | α99% | ^{253}Fm |
| ^{257}No | synth | 25 s | β^{+}1% | ^{257}Md |
| ^{259}No | synth | 58 min | α75% | ^{255}Fm |
| ^{259}No | synth | 58 min | ε25% | ^{259}Md |
| ^{259}No | synth | 58 min | SF<10% | – |

Nobelium is a synthetic chemical element; it has symbol No and atomic number 102. It is named after Alfred Nobel, the inventor of dynamite and benefactor of science. A radioactive metal, it is the tenth transuranium element, the second transfermium, and is the fourteenth member of the actinide series. Like all elements with atomic number over 100, nobelium can only be produced in particle accelerators by bombarding lighter elements with charged particles. A total of twelve nobelium isotopes are known to exist; the most stable is ^{259}No with a half-life of 58 minutes, but the shorter-lived ^{255}No (half-life 3.1 minutes) is most commonly used in chemistry because it can be produced on a larger scale.

Chemistry experiments have confirmed that nobelium behaves as a heavier homolog to ytterbium in the periodic table. The chemical properties of nobelium are not completely known: they are mostly only known in aqueous solution. Before nobelium's discovery, it was predicted that it would show a stable +2 oxidation state as well as the +3 state characteristic of the other actinides; these predictions were later confirmed, as the +2 state is much more stable than the +3 state in aqueous solution and it is difficult to keep nobelium in the +3 state.

In the 1950s and 1960s, many claims of the discovery of nobelium were made from laboratories in Sweden, the Soviet Union, and the United States. Although the Swedish scientists soon retracted their claims, the priority of the discovery and therefore the naming of the element was disputed between Soviet and American scientists. It was not until 1992 that the International Union of Pure and Applied Chemistry (IUPAC) credited the Soviet team with the discovery. Even so, nobelium, the Swedish proposal, was retained as the name of the element due to its long-standing use in the literature.

== Introduction ==
=== Synthesis of superheavy nuclei ===
A graphic depiction of a nuclear fusion reaction. Two nuclei fuse into one, emitting a neutron. Reactions that created new elements to this moment were similar, though varying numbers of neutrons – or alternatively charged particles – may be emitted instead.

A superheavy (Note: In nuclear physics, an element is called heavy if its atomic number is high; lead (element 82) is one example of such a heavy element. The term "superheavy elements" typically refers to elements with atomic number greater than 103 (although there are other definitions, such as atomic number greater than 100 or 112; sometimes, the term is presented an equivalent to the term "transactinide", which puts an upper limit before the beginning of the hypothetical superactinide series). Terms "heavy isotopes" (of a given element) and "heavy nuclei" mean what could be understood in the common language—isotopes of high mass (for the given element) and nuclei of high mass, respectively.) atomic nucleus is created in a nuclear reaction that combines two other nuclei of unequal size (Note: In 2009, a team at the JINR led by Oganessian published results of their attempt to create hassium in a symmetric ^{136}Xe + ^{136}Xe reaction. They failed to observe a single atom in such a reaction, putting the upper limit on the cross section, the measure of probability of a nuclear reaction, as 2.5 pb. In comparison, the reaction that resulted in hassium discovery, ^{208}Pb + ^{58}Fe, had a cross section of ~20 pb (more specifically, 19^{+19}_{-11} pb), as estimated by the discoverers.) into one; roughly, the more unequal the two nuclei in terms of mass, the greater the possibility that the two react. The material made of the heavier nuclei is made into a target, which is then bombarded by the beam of lighter nuclei. Two nuclei can only fuse into one if they are close enough to each other; normally, nuclei (all positively charged) repel each other due to electrostatic repulsion. The strong interaction can overcome this repulsion but only within a very short distance from a nucleus; beam nuclei are thus greatly accelerated in order to make such repulsion insignificant compared to the velocity of the beam nucleus. The energy applied to the beam nuclei to accelerate them can cause them to reach speeds as high as one-tenth of the speed of light. However, if too much energy is applied, the beam nucleus can fall apart.

Coming close enough alone is not enough for two nuclei to fuse: when two nuclei approach each other, they usually remain together for about 10^{−20} seconds and then part ways (not necessarily in the same composition as before the reaction) rather than form a single nucleus. This happens because during the attempted formation of a single nucleus, electrostatic repulsion tears apart the nucleus that is being formed. Each pair of a target and a beam is characterized by its cross section—the probability that fusion will occur if two nuclei approach one another expressed in terms of the transverse area that the incident particle must hit in order for the fusion to occur. (Note: The amount of energy applied to the beam particle to accelerate it can also influence the value of cross section. For example, in the ^{28}_{14}Si + ^{1}_{0}n → ^{28}_{13}Al + ^{1}_{1}p reaction, cross section changes smoothly from 370 mb at 12.3 MeV to 160 mb at 18.3 MeV, with a broad peak at 13.5 MeV with the maximum value of 380 mb.) This fusion may occur as a result of the quantum effect in which nuclei can tunnel through electrostatic repulsion. If the two nuclei can stay close past that phase, multiple nuclear interactions result in redistribution of energy and an energy equilibrium.

External videos
- Visualization of unsuccessful nuclear fusion, based on calculations from the Australian National University

The resulting merger is an excited state—termed a compound nucleus—and thus it is very unstable. To reach a more stable state, the temporary merger may fission without formation of a more stable nucleus. Alternatively, the compound nucleus may eject a few neutrons, which would carry away the excitation energy; if the latter is not sufficient for a neutron expulsion, the merger would produce a gamma ray. This happens in about 10^{−16} seconds after the initial nuclear collision and results in creation of a more stable nucleus. The definition by the IUPAC/IUPAP Joint Working Party (JWP) states that a chemical element can only be recognized as discovered if a nucleus of it exists for at least 10^{−14} seconds. This value was chosen as an estimate of how long it takes a nucleus to acquire electrons and thus display its chemical properties. (Note: This figure also marks the generally accepted upper limit for lifetime of a compound nucleus.)

=== Decay and detection ===
The beam passes through the target and reaches the next chamber, the separator; if a new nucleus is produced, it is carried with this beam. In the separator, the newly produced nucleus is separated from other nuclides (that of the original beam and any other reaction products) (Note: This separation is based on that the resulting nuclei move past the target more slowly then the unreacted beam nuclei. The separator contains electric and magnetic fields whose effects on a moving particle cancel out for a specific velocity of a particle. Such separation can also be aided by a time-of-flight measurement and a recoil energy measurement; a combination of the two may allow to estimate the mass of a nucleus.) and transferred to a surface-barrier detector, which stops the nucleus. The exact location of the upcoming impact on the detector is marked; also marked are its energy and the time of the arrival. The transfer takes about 10^{−6} seconds; in order to be detected, the nucleus must survive this long. The nucleus is recorded again once its decay is registered, and the location, the energy, and the time of the decay are measured.

Stability of a nucleus is provided by the strong interaction. However, its range is very short; as nuclei become larger, its influence on the outermost nucleons (protons and neutrons) weakens. At the same time, the nucleus is torn apart by electrostatic repulsion between protons, and its range is not limited. Total binding energy provided by the strong interaction increases linearly with the number of nucleons, whereas electrostatic repulsion increases with the square of the atomic number, i.e. the latter grows faster and becomes increasingly important for heavy and superheavy nuclei. Superheavy nuclei are thus theoretically predicted and have so far been observed to predominantly decay via decay modes that are caused by such repulsion: alpha decay and spontaneous fission. (Note: Not all decay modes are caused by electrostatic repulsion. For example, beta decay is caused by the weak interaction.) Almost all alpha emitters have over 210 nucleons, and the lightest nuclide primarily undergoing spontaneous fission has 238. In both decay modes, nuclei are inhibited from decaying by corresponding energy barriers for each mode, but they can be tunneled through.

Scheme of an apparatus for creation of superheavy elements, based on the Dubna Gas-Filled Recoil Separator set up in the Flerov Laboratory of Nuclear Reactions in JINR. The trajectory within the detector and the beam focusing apparatus changes because of a dipole magnet in the former and quadrupole magnets in the latter.

Alpha particles are commonly produced in radioactive decays because the mass of an alpha particle per nucleon is small enough to leave some energy for the alpha particle to be used as kinetic energy to leave the nucleus. Spontaneous fission is caused by electrostatic repulsion tearing the nucleus apart and produces various nuclei in different instances of identical nuclei fissioning. As the atomic number increases, spontaneous fission rapidly becomes more important: spontaneous fission partial half-lives decrease by 23 orders of magnitude from uranium (element 92) to nobelium (element 102), and by 30 orders of magnitude from thorium (element 90) to fermium (element 100). The earlier liquid drop model thus suggested that spontaneous fission would occur nearly instantly due to disappearance of the fission barrier for nuclei with about 280 nucleons. The later nuclear shell model suggested that nuclei with about 300 nucleons would form an island of stability in which nuclei will be more resistant to spontaneous fission and will primarily undergo alpha decay with longer half-lives. Subsequent discoveries suggested that the predicted island might be further than originally anticipated; they also showed that nuclei intermediate between the long-lived actinides and the predicted island are deformed, and gain additional stability from shell effects. Experiments on lighter superheavy nuclei, as well as those closer to the expected island, have shown greater than previously anticipated stability against spontaneous fission, showing the importance of shell effects on nuclei. (Note: It was already known by the 1960s that ground states of nuclei differed in energy and shape as well as that certain magic numbers of nucleons corresponded to greater stability of a nucleus. However, it was assumed that there was no nuclear structure in superheavy nuclei as they were too deformed to form one.)

Alpha decays are registered by the emitted alpha particles, and the decay products are easy to determine before the actual decay; if such a decay or a series of consecutive decays produces a known nucleus, the original product of a reaction can be easily determined. (Note: Since mass of a nucleus is not measured directly but is rather calculated from that of another nucleus, such measurement is called indirect. Direct measurements are also possible, but for the most part they have remained unavailable for superheavy nuclei. The first direct measurement of mass of a superheavy nucleus was reported in 2018 at LBNL. Mass was determined from the location of a nucleus after the transfer (the location helps determine its trajectory, which is linked to the mass-to-charge ratio of the nucleus, since the transfer was done in presence of a magnet).) (That all decays within a decay chain were indeed related to each other is established by the location of these decays, which must be in the same place.) The known nucleus can be recognized by the specific characteristics of decay it undergoes such as decay energy (or more specifically, the kinetic energy of the emitted particle). (Note: If the decay occurred in a vacuum, then since total momentum of an isolated system before and after the decay must be preserved, the daughter nucleus would also receive a small velocity. The ratio of the two velocities, and accordingly the ratio of the kinetic energies, would thus be inverse to the ratio of the two masses. The decay energy equals the sum of the known kinetic energy of the alpha particle and that of the daughter nucleus (an exact fraction of the former). The calculations hold for an experiment as well, but the difference is that the nucleus does not move after the decay because it is tied to the detector.) Spontaneous fission, however, produces various nuclei as products, so the original nuclide cannot be determined from its daughters. (Note: Spontaneous fission was discovered by Soviet physicist Georgy Flerov, a leading scientist at JINR, and thus it was a "hobbyhorse" for the facility. In contrast, the LBL scientists believed fission information was not sufficient for a claim of synthesis of an element. They believed spontaneous fission had not been studied enough to use it for identification of a new element, since there was a difficulty of establishing that a compound nucleus had only ejected neutrons and not charged particles like protons or alpha particles. They thus preferred to link new isotopes to the already known ones by successive alpha decays.)

The information available to physicists aiming to synthesize a superheavy element is thus the information collected at the detectors: location, energy, and time of arrival of a particle to the detector, and those of its decay. The physicists analyze this data and seek to conclude that it was indeed caused by a new element and could not have been caused by a different nuclide than the one claimed. Often, provided data is insufficient for a conclusion that a new element was definitely created and there is no other explanation for the observed effects; errors in interpreting data have been made. (Note: For instance, element 102 was mistakenly identified in 1957 at the Nobel Institute of Physics in Stockholm, Stockholm County, Sweden. There were no earlier definitive claims of creation of this element, and the element was assigned a name by its Swedish, American, and British discoverers, nobelium. It was later shown that the identification was incorrect. The following year, RL was unable to reproduce the Swedish results and announced instead their synthesis of the element; that claim was also disproved later. JINR insisted that they were the first to create the element and suggested a name of their own for the new element, joliotium; the Soviet name was also not accepted (JINR later referred to the naming of the element 102 as "hasty"). This name was proposed to IUPAC in a written response to their ruling on priority of discovery claims of elements, signed 29 September 1992. The name "nobelium" remained unchanged on account of its widespread usage.)

== Discovery ==
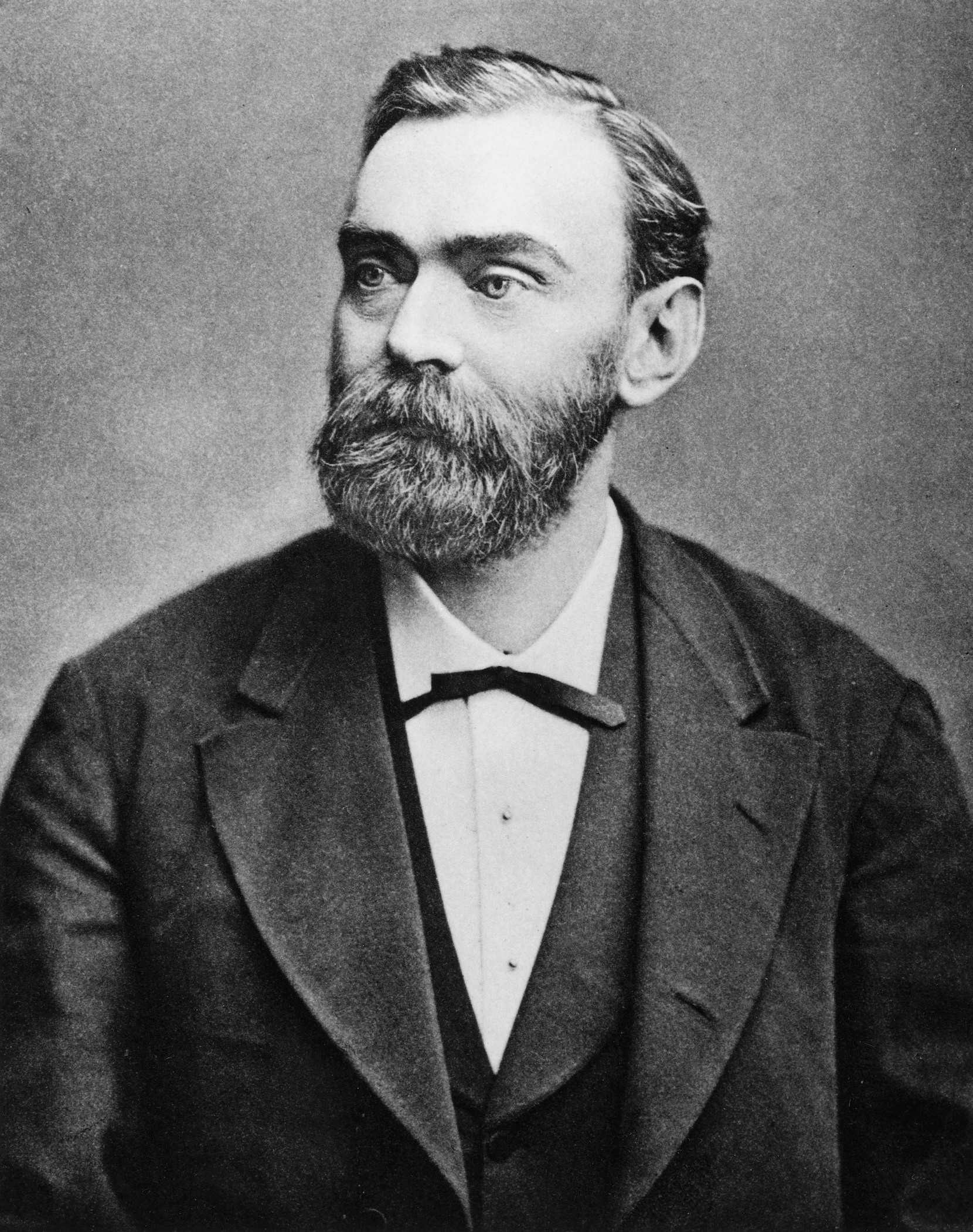
The element was named after Alfred Nobel

The discovery of element 102 was a complicated process and was claimed by groups from Sweden, the United Kingdom, the United States, and the Soviet Union. The first complete and incontrovertible report of its detection only came in 1966 from the Joint Institute of Nuclear Research at Dubna (then in the Soviet Union).

The first announcement of the discovery of element 102 was announced by physicists from Argonne National Laboratory, Harwell Atomic Energy Research Establishment, and Nobel Institute for Physics in Sweden in 1957. The team reported that they had bombarded a curium target with carbon-13 ions in half-hour intervals for fifty times. Between bombardments, ion-exchange chemistry was performed on the target. Twelve out of the fifty bombardments contained samples emitting (8.5 ± 0.1) MeV alpha particles, which were in drops which eluted earlier than fermium (atomic number Z = 100) and californium (Z = 98). The half-life reported was 10 minutes and was assigned to either ^{251}No or ^{253}No, although the possibility that the alpha particles observed were from a presumably short-lived mendelevium (Z = 101) isotope created from the electron capture of element 102 was not excluded. The team proposed the name nobelium (No) for the new element, which was immediately approved by IUPAC, a decision which the Dubna group characterized in 1968 as being hasty.

In 1958, scientists at the Lawrence Berkeley National Laboratory repeated the experiment. The Berkeley team, consisting of Albert Ghiorso, Glenn T. Seaborg, John R. Walton and Torbjørn Sikkeland, used the new heavy-ion linear accelerator (HILAC) to bombard a curium target (95% ^{244}Cm and 5% ^{246}Cm) with ^{13}C and ^{12}C ions. They were unable to confirm the 8.5 MeV activity claimed by the Swedes but were instead able to detect decays from ^{250}Fm, supposedly the daughter of ^{254}No (produced from the ^{246}Cm), which had an apparent half-life of ~3 s. Probably this assignment was also wrong, as later 1963 Dubna work showed that the half-life of ^{254}No is significantly longer (about 50 s). It is more likely that the observed alpha decays did not come from element 102, but rather from ^{250m}Fm.

In 1959, the Swedish team attempted to explain the Berkeley team's inability to detect element 102 in 1958, maintaining that they did discover it. However, later work has shown that no nobelium isotopes lighter than ^{259}No (no heavier isotopes could have been produced in the Swedish experiments) with a half-life over 3 minutes exist, and that the Swedish team's results are most likely from ^{225}Th, which has a half-life of 8 minutes and quickly undergoes triple alpha decay to ^{213}Po, which has a decay energy of 8.53612 MeV. This hypothesis is lent weight by the fact that ^{225}Th can easily be produced in the reaction used and would not be separated out by the chemical methods used. Later work on nobelium also showed that the divalent state is more stable than the trivalent one and hence that the samples emitting the alpha particles could not have contained nobelium, as the divalent nobelium would not have eluted with the other trivalent actinides. Thus, the Swedish team later retracted their claim and associated the activity to background effects.

In 1959, the team continued their studies and claimed that they were able to produce an isotope that decayed predominantly by emission of an 8.3 MeV alpha particle, with a half-life of 3 s with an associated 30% spontaneous fission branch. The activity was initially assigned to ^{254}No but later changed to ^{252}No. However, they also noted that it was not certain that element 102 had been produced due to difficult conditions. The Berkeley team decided to adopt the proposed name of the Swedish team, "nobelium", for the element.

^{244}_{96}Cm + ^{12}_{6}C → ^{256}_{102}No^{*} → ^{252}_{102}No + 4 ^{1}_{0}n

Meanwhile, in Dubna, experiments were carried out in 1958 and 1960 aiming to synthesize element 102 as well. The first 1958 experiment bombarded ^{239}Pu and ^{241}Pu with ^{16}O ions. Some alpha decays with energies just over 8.5 MeV were observed, and they were assigned to ^{251,252,253}No, although the team wrote that formation of isotopes from lead or bismuth impurities (which would not produce nobelium) could not be ruled out. While later 1958 experiments noted that new isotopes could be produced from mercury, thallium, lead, or bismuth impurities, the scientists still stood by their conclusion that element 102 could be produced from this reaction, mentioning a half-life of under 30 seconds and a decay energy of (8.8 ± 0.5) MeV. Later 1960 experiments proved that these were background effects. 1967 experiments also lowered the decay energy to (8.6 ± 0.4) MeV, but both values are too high to possibly match those of ^{253}No or ^{254}No. The Dubna team later stated in 1970 and again in 1987 that these results were not conclusive.

In 1961, Berkeley scientists claimed the discovery of lawrencium in the reaction of californium with boron and carbon ions. They claimed the production of the isotope ^{257}Lr, and also claimed to have synthesized an alpha-decaying isotope of element 102 that had a half-life of 15 s and alpha decay energy 8.2 MeV. They assigned this to ^{255}No without giving a reason for the assignment. The values do not agree with those now known for ^{255}No, although they do agree with those now known for ^{257}No, and while this isotope probably played a part in this experiment, its discovery was inconclusive.

Work on element 102 also continued in Dubna, and in 1964, experiments were carried out there to detect alpha-decay daughters of element 102 isotopes by synthesizing element 102 from the reaction of a ^{238}U target with neon ions. The products were carried along a silver catcher foil and purified chemically, and the isotopes ^{250}Fm and ^{252}Fm were detected. The yield of ^{252}Fm was interpreted as evidence that its parent ^{256}No was also synthesized: as it was noted that ^{252}Fm could also be produced directly in this reaction by the simultaneous emission of an alpha particle with the excess neutrons, steps were taken to ensure that ^{252}Fm could not go directly to the catcher foil. The half-life detected for ^{256}No was 8 s, which is much higher than the more modern 1967 value of (3.2 ± 0.2) s. Further experiments were conducted in 1966 for ^{254}No, using the reactions ^{243}Am(^{15}N,4n)^{254}No and ^{238}U(^{22}Ne,6n)^{254}No, finding a half-life of (50 ± 10) s: at that time the discrepancy between this value and the earlier Berkeley value was not understood, although later work proved that the formation of the isomer ^{250m}Fm was less likely in the Dubna experiments than at the Berkeley ones. In hindsight, the Dubna results on ^{254}No were probably correct and can be now considered a conclusive detection of element 102.

One more very convincing experiment from Dubna was published in 1966 (though it was submitted in 1965), again using the same two reactions, which concluded that ^{254}No indeed had a half-life much longer than the 3 seconds claimed by Berkeley. Later work in 1967 at Berkeley and 1971 at the Oak Ridge National Laboratory fully confirmed the discovery of element 102 and clarified earlier observations. In December 1966, the Berkeley group repeated the Dubna experiments and fully confirmed them, and used this data to finally assign correctly the isotopes they had previously synthesized but could not yet identify at the time. Thus they claimed to have discovered nobelium in 1958 to 1961.

^{238}_{92}U + ^{22}_{10}Ne → ^{260}_{102}No^{*} → ^{254}_{102}No + 6 ^{1}_{0}n

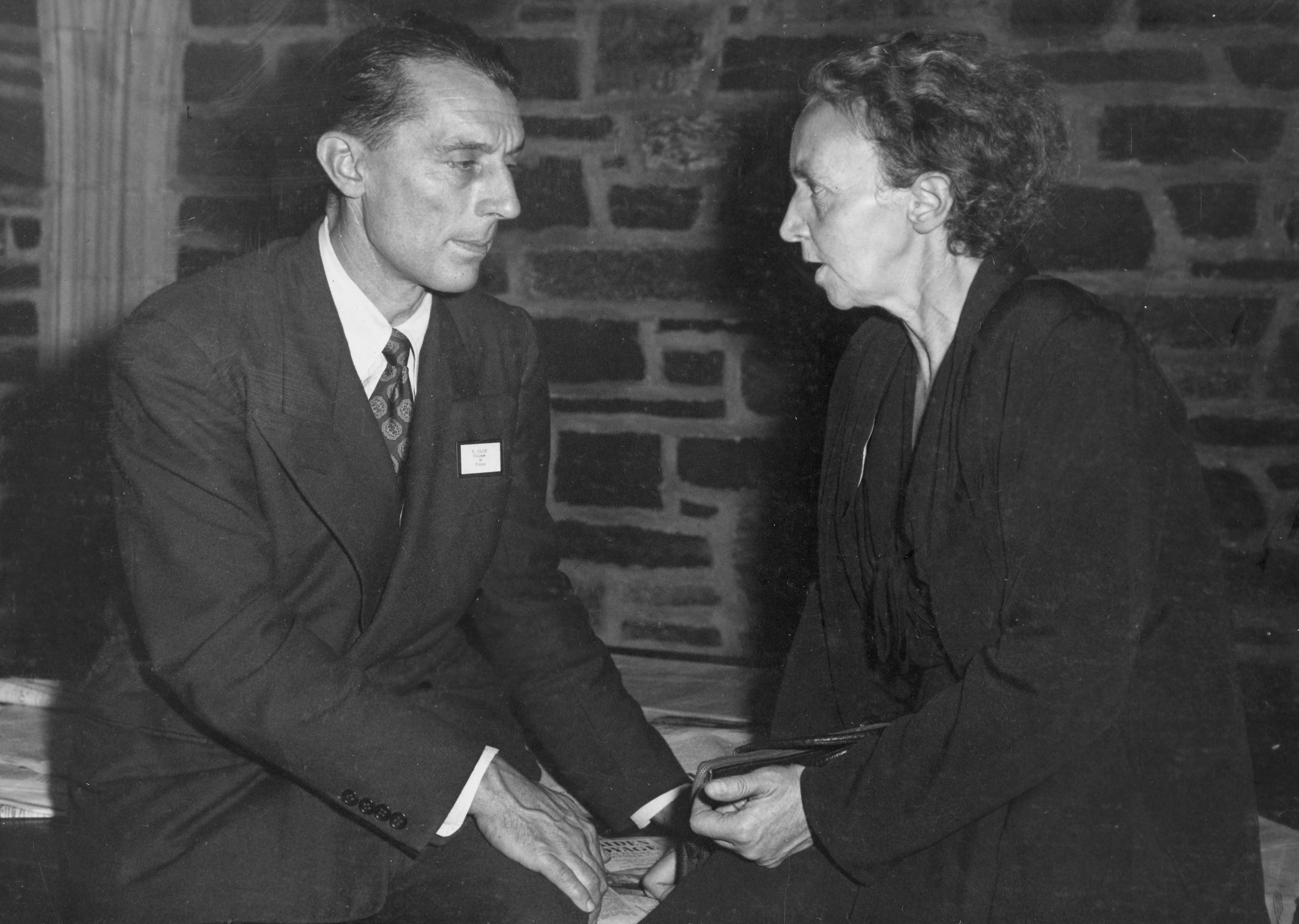
Frédéric Joliot and Irène Joliot-Curie

In 1969, the Dubna team carried out chemical experiments on element 102 and concluded that it behaved as the heavier homologue of ytterbium. The Russian scientists proposed the name joliotium (Jo) for the new element after Irène Joliot-Curie, who had recently died, creating an element naming controversy that would not be resolved for several decades, with each group using its own proposed names.

In 1992, the IUPAC-IUPAP Transfermium Working Group (TWG) reassessed the claims of discovery and concluded that only the Dubna work from 1966 correctly detected and assigned decays to nuclei with atomic number 102 at the time. The Dubna team are therefore officially recognized as the discoverers of nobelium, although it is possible that it was detected at Berkeley in 1959. This decision was criticized by Berkeley the following year, calling the reopening of the cases of elements 101 to 103 a "futile waste of time", while Dubna agreed with IUPAC's decision.

In 1994, as part of an attempted resolution to the element naming controversy, IUPAC ratified names for elements 101–109. For element 102, it ratified the name nobelium (No) on the basis that it had become entrenched in the literature over the course of 30 years and that Alfred Nobel should be commemorated in this fashion. Because of outcry over the 1994 names, which mostly did not respect the choices of the discoverers, a comment period ensued, and in 1995 IUPAC named element 102 flerovium (Fl) as part of a new proposal, after either Georgy Flyorov or his eponymous Flerov Laboratory of Nuclear Reactions. This proposal was also not accepted, and in 1997 the name nobelium was restored. Today the name flerovium, with the same symbol, refers to element 114.

== Characteristics ==
=== Physical ===
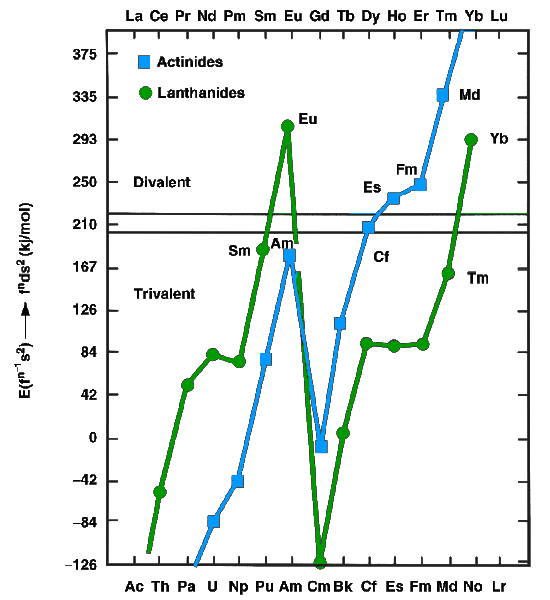
Energy required to promote an f electron to the d subshell for the f-block lanthanides and actinides. Above around 210 kJ/mol, this energy is too high to be provided for by the greater crystal energy of the trivalent state and thus einsteinium, fermium, and mendelevium form divalent metals like the lanthanides europium and ytterbium. Nobelium is also expected to form a divalent metal, but this has not yet been confirmed.

In the periodic table, nobelium is located to the right of the actinide mendelevium, to the left of the actinide lawrencium, and below the lanthanide ytterbium. Nobelium metal has not yet been prepared in bulk quantities, and bulk preparation is currently impossible. Nevertheless, a number of predictions and some preliminary experimental results have been done regarding its properties.

The lanthanides and actinides, in the metallic state, can exist as either divalent (such as europium and ytterbium) or trivalent (most other lanthanides) metals. The former have f^{n}s^{2} configurations, whereas the latter have f^{n−1}d^{1}s^{2} configurations. In 1975, Johansson and Rosengren examined the measured and predicted values for the cohesive energies (enthalpies of crystallization) of the metallic lanthanides and actinides, both as divalent and trivalent metals. The conclusion was that the increased binding energy of the [Rn]5f^{13}6d^{1}7s^{2} configuration over the [Rn]5f^{14}7s^{2} configuration for nobelium was not enough to compensate for the energy needed to promote one 5f electron to 6d, as is true also for the very late actinides: thus einsteinium, fermium, mendelevium, and nobelium were expected to be divalent metals, although for nobelium this prediction has not yet been confirmed. The increasing predominance of the divalent state well before the actinide series concludes is attributed to the relativistic stabilization of the 5f electrons, which increases with increasing atomic number: an effect of this is that nobelium is predominantly divalent instead of trivalent, unlike all the other lanthanides and actinides. In 1986, nobelium metal was estimated to have an enthalpy of sublimation between 126 kJ/mol, a value close to the values for einsteinium, fermium, and mendelevium and supporting the theory that nobelium would form a divalent metal. Like the other divalent late actinides (except the once again trivalent lawrencium), metallic nobelium should assume a face-centered cubic crystal structure. Divalent nobelium metal should have a metallic radius of around 197 pm. Nobelium's melting point has been predicted to be 800 °C, the same value as that estimated for the neighboring element mendelevium. Its density is predicted to be around 9.9 ± 0.4 g/cm^{3}.

=== Chemical ===
The chemistry of nobelium is incompletely characterized and is known only in aqueous solution, in which it can take on the +3 or +2 oxidation states, the latter being more stable. It was largely expected before the discovery of nobelium that in solution, it would behave like the other actinides, with the trivalent state being predominant; however, Seaborg predicted in 1949 that the +2 state would also be relatively stable for nobelium, as the No^{2+} ion would have the ground-state electron configuration [Rn]5f^{14}, including the stable filled 5f^{14} shell. It took nineteen years before this prediction was confirmed.

In 1967, experiments were conducted to compare nobelium's chemical behavior to that of terbium, californium, and fermium. All four elements were reacted with chlorine and the resulting chlorides were deposited along a tube, along which they were carried by a gas. It was found that the nobelium chloride produced was strongly adsorbed on solid surfaces, proving that it was not very volatile, like the chlorides of the other three investigated elements. However, both NoCl_{2} and NoCl_{3} were expected to exhibit nonvolatile behavior and hence this experiment was inconclusive as to what the preferred oxidation state of nobelium was. Determination of nobelium's favoring of the +2 state had to wait until the next year, when cation-exchange chromatography and coprecipitation experiments were carried out on around fifty thousand ^{255}No atoms, finding that it behaved differently from the other actinides and more like the divalent alkaline earth metals. This proved that in aqueous solution, nobelium is most stable in the divalent state when strong oxidizers are absent. Later experimentation in 1974 showed that nobelium eluted with the alkaline earth metals, between Ca^{2+} and Sr^{2+}. Nobelium is the only known f-block element for which the +2 state is the most common and stable one in aqueous solution. This occurs because of the large energy gap between the 5f and 6d orbitals at the end of the actinide series.

It is expected that the relativistic stabilization of the 7s subshell greatly destabilizes nobelium dihydride, NoH_{2}, and relativistic stabilisation of the 7p_{1/2} spinor over the 6d_{3/2} spinor mean that excited states in nobelium atoms have 7s and 7p contribution instead of the expected 6d contribution. The long No–H distances in the NoH_{2} molecule and the significant charge transfer lead to extreme ionicity with a dipole moment of 5.94 D for this molecule. In this molecule, nobelium is expected to exhibit main-group-like behavior, specifically acting like an alkaline earth metal with its ns^{2} valence shell configuration and core-like 5f orbitals.

Nobelium's complexing ability with chloride ions is most similar to that of barium, which complexes rather weakly. Its complexing ability with citrate, oxalate, and acetate in an aqueous solution of 0.5 M ammonium nitrate is between that of calcium and strontium, although it is somewhat closer to that of strontium.

The standard reduction potential of the E°(No^{3+}→No^{2+}) couple was estimated in 1969 to be between +1.4 and +1.5 V; it was later found in 2009 to be only about +0.75 V. The positive value shows that No^{2+} is more stable than No^{3+} and that No^{3+} is a good oxidizing agent. While the quoted values for the E°(No^{2+}→No^{0}) and E°(No^{3+}→No^{0}) vary among sources, the accepted standard estimates are −2.61 and −1.26 V. It has been predicted that the value for the E°(No^{4+}→No^{3+}) couple would be +6.5 V. The Gibbs energies of formation for No^{3+} and No^{2+} are estimated to be −342 and −480 kJ/mol, respectively.

=== Atomic ===
A nobelium atom has 102 electrons. They are expected to be arranged in the configuration [Rn]5f^{14}7s^{2} (ground state term symbol ^{1}S_{0}), although experimental verification of this electron configuration had not yet been made as of 2006. The sixteen electrons in the 5f and 7s subshells are valence electrons. In forming compounds, three valence electrons may be lost, leaving behind a [Rn]5f^{13} core: this conforms to the trend set by the other actinides with their [Rn]5f^{n} electron configurations in the tripositive state. Nevertheless, it is more likely that only two valence electrons are lost, leaving behind a stable [Rn]5f^{14} core with a filled 5f^{14} shell. The first ionization potential of nobelium was measured to be at most (6.65 ± 0.07) eV in 1974, based on the assumption that the 7s electrons would ionize before the 5f ones; this value was later refined to be 6.62621 eV (639.33 kJ/mol). The ionic radius of hexacoordinate and octacoordinate No^{3+} had been preliminarily estimated in 1978 to be around 90 and 102 pm respectively; the ionic radius of No^{2+} has been experimentally found to be 100 pm to two significant figures. The enthalpy of hydration of No^{2+} has been calculated as 1486 kJ/mol.

=== Isotopes ===
Fourteen isotopes of nobelium are known, with mass numbers 248–260 and 262; all are radioactive. Additionally, seventeen nuclear isomers are known, their mass numbers range between 250 to 256. Of these, the longest-lived isotope is ^{259}No with a half-life of 58 minutes, and the longest-lived isomer is ^{251m}No with a half-life of 1.02 seconds. However, the still undiscovered isotope ^{261}No is predicted to have a still longer half-life of 3 hours. Additionally, the shorter-lived ^{255}No (half-life 3.52 minutes) is more often used in chemical experimentation because it can be produced in larger quantities from irradiation of californium-249 with carbon-12 ions. After ^{259}No and ^{255}No, the next most stable nobelium isotopes are ^{253}No (half-life 1.57 minutes), ^{254}No (51.2 seconds), ^{257}No (24.5 seconds), ^{256}No (2.91 seconds), and ^{252}No (2.467 seconds). All of the remaining nobelium isotopes have half-lives that are less than a second, and the shortest-lived known nobelium isotope (^{248}No) has a half-life of less than 2 microseconds. The isotope ^{254}No is especially interesting theoretically as it is in the middle of a series of prolate nuclei from ^{231}Pa to ^{279}Rg, and the formation of its nuclear isomers (of which two are known) is controlled by proton orbitals such as 2f_{5/2} which come just above the spherical proton shell; it can be synthesized in the reaction of ^{208}Pb with ^{48}Ca.

The half-lives of nobelium isotopes increase smoothly from ^{250}No to ^{253}No. However, a dip appears at ^{254}No, and beyond this the half-lives of even-even nobelium isotopes drop sharply as spontaneous fission becomes the dominant decay mode. For example, the half-life of ^{256}No is almost three seconds, but that of ^{258}No is only 1.2 milliseconds. This shows that at nobelium, the mutual repulsion of protons poses a limit to the region of long-lived nuclei in the actinide series. The even-odd nobelium isotopes mostly continue to have longer half-lives as their mass numbers increase, with a dip in the trend at ^{257}No.

== Preparation and purification ==
The isotopes of nobelium are mostly produced by bombarding actinide targets (uranium, plutonium, curium, californium, or einsteinium), with the exception of nobelium-262, which is produced as the daughter of lawrencium-262. The most commonly used isotope, ^{255}No, can be produced from bombarding curium-248 or californium-249 with carbon-12: the latter method is more common. Irradiating a 350 μg cm^{−2} target of californium-249 with three trillion 73 MeV carbon-12 ions per second for ten minutes can produce around 1200 nobelium-255 atoms.

Once the nobelium-255 is produced, it can be separated out similarly as used to purify the neighboring actinide mendelevium. The recoil momentum of the produced nobelium-255 atoms is used to bring them physically far away from the target from which they are produced, bringing them onto a thin foil of metal (usually beryllium, aluminium, platinum, or gold) just behind the target in a vacuum: this is usually combined by trapping the nobelium atoms in a gas atmosphere (frequently helium), and carrying them along with a gas jet from a small opening in the reaction chamber. Using a long capillary tube, and including potassium chloride aerosols in the helium gas, the nobelium atoms can be transported over tens of meters. The thin layer of nobelium collected on the foil can then be removed with dilute acid without completely dissolving the foil. The nobelium can then be isolated by exploiting its tendency to form the divalent state, unlike the other trivalent actinides: under typically used elution conditions (bis-(2-ethylhexyl) phosphoric acid (HDEHP) as stationary organic phase and 0.05 M hydrochloric acid as mobile aqueous phase, or using 3 M hydrochloric acid as an eluant from cation-exchange resin columns), nobelium will pass through the column and elute while the other trivalent actinides remain on the column. However, if a direct "catcher" gold foil is used, the process is complicated by the need to separate out the gold using anion-exchange chromatography before isolating the nobelium by elution from chromatographic extraction columns using HDEHP.

== Bibliography ==
- Audi, G.; Kondev, F. G.; Wang, M.; et al. (2017). "The NUBASE2016 evaluation of nuclear properties" (PDF). Chinese Physics C. 41 (3) 030001. Bibcode:2017ChPhC..41c0001A. doi:10.1088/1674-1137/41/3/030001.
- Beiser, A. (2003). Concepts of modern physics (6th ed.). McGraw-Hill. ISBN 978-0-07-244848-1. OCLC 48965418.
- Hoffman, D. C.; Ghiorso, A.; Seaborg, G. T. (2000). The Transuranium People: The Inside Story. World Scientific. ISBN 978-1-78-326244-1.
- Kragh, H. (2018). From Transuranic to Superheavy Elements: A Story of Dispute and Creation. Springer. ISBN 978-3-319-75813-8.
- Silva, Robert J. (2011). "Chapter 13. Fermium, Mendelevium, Nobelium, and Lawrencium". In Morss, Lester R.; Edelstein, Norman M.; Fuger, Jean (eds.). The Chemistry of the Actinide and Transactinide Elements. Netherlands: Springer. pp. 1621–1651. doi:10.1007/978-94-007-0211-0_13. ISBN 978-94-007-0210-3.
- Zagrebaev, V.; Karpov, A.; Greiner, W. (2013). "Future of superheavy element research: Which nuclei could be synthesized within the next few years?". Journal of Physics: Conference Series. 420 (1) 012001. arXiv:1207.5700. Bibcode:2013JPhCS.420a2001Z. doi:10.1088/1742-6596/420/1/012001. ISSN 1742-6588. S2CID 55434734.
