= Annals of Clinical & Laboratory Science =

- Discipline: Laboratory medicine
- Language: English
- Edited by: Nina Tatevian

Publication details
- Former name: Annals of Clinical Laboratory Science
- History: 1971–present
- Publisher: Institute for Clinical Science (United States)
- Frequency: Quarterly
- Impact factor: 0.839 (2013)

Standard abbreviations
- ISO 4: Ann. Clin. Lab. Sci.

Indexing
- CODEN: ACLSCP
- ISSN: 0091-7370 (print); 1550-8080 (web)
- OCLC no.: 02864670

Links
- Journal homepage; Online access; Online archive

The Annals of Clinical & Laboratory Science is a quarterly academic journal. It is the official journal of, and is published by, the Association of Clinical Scientists. It was established in 1971 as Annals of Clinical Laboratory Science by F. William Sunderman and obtained its current title in 1973. As of 2022, the editor-in-chief is Nina Tatevian.

== Abstracting and indexing ==
The journal is abstracted and indexed in:

- BIOSIS Previews
- CAB Abstracts
- Chemical Abstracts
- Current Contents/Clinical Medicine
- Current Contents/Life Sciences
- Elsevier BIOBASE
- Embase
- Global Health
- Index Medicus/MEDLINE/PubMed
- PASCAL
- Science Citation Index
- Scopus
- SIIC Database (Sociedad Iberoamericana de Informacion Cientifica)
- Tropical Diseases Bulletin

According to the Journal Citation Reports, the journal has a 2013 impact factor of 0.839, ranking it 24th out of 31 journals in the category "Medical Laboratory Technology".
