= Torbjørn Sikkeland =

Torbjørn Sikkeland (3 August 1923 – 7 November 2014) was a Norwegian chemist, nuclear physicist and radiation biophysicist.

He was born in Norway in Varteig. He was part of the Berkeley team that claimed discovery of the synthetic transuranic elements of nobelium and lawrencium. He was appointed professor at the Norwegian Institute of Technology in Trondheim from 1969 to 1993. He was a fellow of the Norwegian Academy of Technological Sciences.

He died in November 2014.
