= Jiang Guiti =

Chinese general

- 姜桂題
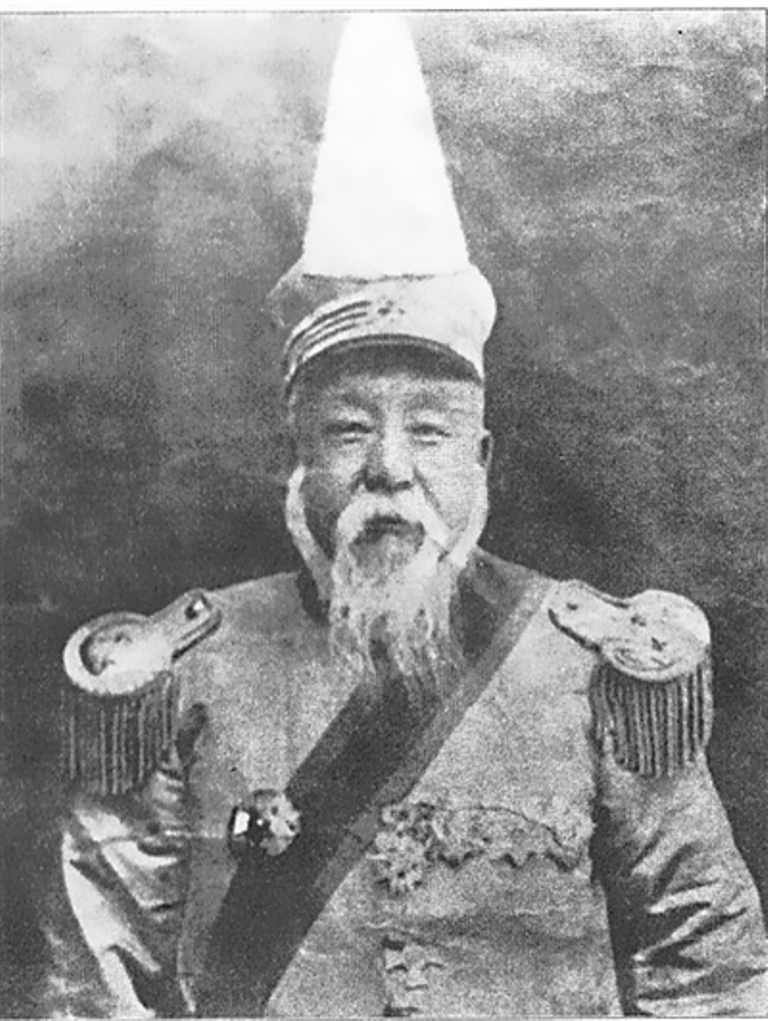
- Born: 1844; Anhui province, Qing Empire
- Died: January 16, 1922 (aged 77–78); Beijing, Republic of China
- Military career
- Allegiance: Qing Dynasty; Beiyang clique
- Branch: Beiyang Army
- Conflicts: Taiping Rebellion; Nian Rebellion; First Sino-Japanese War; Boxer Rebellion
- Awards: Order of Rank and Merit

Jiang Guiti (Chinese: 姜桂題; 1844 – January 16, 1922) was a Chinese general who served under Song Qing in the suppression of the Taiping and Nian rebels and later against the Empire of Japan. He was a warlord during the warlord era and the de facto ruler of Rehe province until its conquest by the Fengtian Clique.
