= Zheng Ji (biochemist) =

Chinese nutritionist and biochemist (1900–2010)

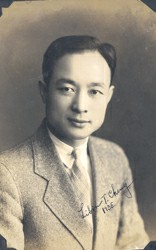
- Zheng Ji in 1935
- Born: 6 May 1900; Nanxi, Sichuan, Qing dynasty
- Died: 29 July 2010 (aged 110 years, 84 days); Nanjing, Jiangsu, China
- Education: National Southeastern University; National Central University; Nanjing University; Ohio State University; Yale University; Indiana University Bloomington
- Occupations: Nutritionist and professor of biochemistry, institute founder, tutor
- Known for: Scientific Research Institute of China, Biology Professor and department head at Central Medical School, Eastern China Military School, Professor of Biology and head of biochemistry Nanjing Medical University

Zheng Ji (Note: also known as Libin T. Cheng (his last name was spelled as Cheng in the Wade-Giles system before Pinyin was used to spell the names of Chinese people and places)) (Chinese: 郑集; 6 May 1900 – 29 July 2010) was a Chinese nutritionist and biochemist, sometimes regarded as the founder of modern nutrition science in China. He was reputed to be the world's oldest professor, having lived to the age of 110.

== Early life ==
Libin T. Cheng was born in Nanxi County, Sichuan Province, China in 1900.

In 1924 he passed the entrance exam for the National Southeastern University (renamed the National Central University in 1928, and then Nanjing University) and studied at the biology department.

In 1930 he went to the United States to study, majoring in biochemistry at Ohio State University, and earned a M.S. in 1931. He also attended Yale University and obtained a Doctor of Philosophy from Indiana University Bloomington in 1934.

In the same year, he was elected to membership of the Sigma Xi Society, based on his research achievements and potential.

== Career ==
In 1931, Cheng became a member of the U.S. Branch of the Science Society of China, and had his co-authored research paper "Motor Localization on the Cerebral Cortex of the Guinea-pig (Cavia Cobaya)" published in The Journal of Comparative Neurology.

Returning to China in 1934, Cheng was in charge of establishing the Department of Physiological Chemistry in the Biological Laboratory of the Science Society of China.

He served both as a professor and the director of the Department of Biochemistry in the Medical School of National Central University. Simultaneously, he taught at the Eastern China Military Medical School and at the Number 4 Military Medical College. From 1950, Cheng worked both as a biology professor and the head of the Department of Biochemistry at the Nanjing Medical University.

In 1945, at the Medical School of National Central University, he established a biochemistry research institute to train graduate students, the first such institute in China. After turning 70 he began to study the biochemistry of old age, proposing a theory of metabolic imbalance.

He participated in the establishment of the Chinese Nutrition Society and, later on, the Chinese Biochemistry Society. He was a past chairman of the Central University Professors Association and the first council chair of the Chinese Nutrition Society. He wrote many teaching materials and writing textbooks.

After the age of 100, he was still teaching and writing. He received many honourable certificates and awards in China and abroad.

In 2010, E. Gordon Gee, president of the Ohio State University, visited Zheng in Nanjing.

Zheng turned 110 in May 2010, and was claimed to be the oldest professor living in the world. He died on 29 July 2010, at the age of 110. He was listed as one of the great minds in his generation of Chinese biophysicists.

== Awards ==
- 21st-Century Award for Achievement, International Biographical Centre, Cambridge, England, 2003
- International Man of the Year of 1992-1993 from the International Biographical Centre, Cambridge, England, 1993

== See also ==
- List of centenarians (scientists and mathematicians)
