= Nellie May Naylor =

American chemist

- Born: March 20, 1885; Clear Lake, Iowa, United States
- Died: October 5, 1992 (aged 107)
- Education: University of Iowa (B.A.); Iowa State University (MSc.); Columbia University (PhD)
- Scientific career
- Doctoral advisor: Henry Clapp Sherman

Nellie May Naylor (March 20, 1885 – October 5, 1992) was an American chemist. She was a chemistry professor at Iowa State University (then known as lowa State College), teaching between 1908 until 1955. She was only the second woman to hold this job in the chemistry department.

== Early life and education ==
Naylor was born March 20, 1885, in Clear Lake, Iowa, the daughter of James Sewell Naylor and Mary Gunson Naylor. Her mother, Mary Gunson Naylor, was English-born.

Naylor was raised on a farm in Clear Lake, Iowa, and was educated at Clear Lake High School. She went on to earn a B.A. in education in 1908 at the State University of lowa (now the University of Iowa), and an M.S. in 1918 from lowa State College (now Iowa State University).

Naylor went on to earn her PhD in chemistry at Columbia University in 1923. Her doctoral dissertation, supervised by Henry Clapp Sherman, was titled "Influence of Some Organic Compounds upon the Hydrolysis of Starch by Salivary and Pancreatic Amylases."

== Career ==
Naylor taught public school in her hometown for one year in 1907, before joining the staff at Iowa State University. Naylor published scientific papers in organic chemistry, but she was also interested in how chemistry was taught, especially to undergraduate women. She wrote,

"When a freshman girl comes over to a chemistry class, she perhaps leaves a class in cookery, meal planning, or color and design, which has held her interest because of her familiarity with that work and her sympathetic attitude toward it. Entering her chemistry class, she is bewildered by the array of unrecognized pieces of apparatus and the unfamiliar terms used. Can we wonder at the lack of attention in chemistry class as we begin to discuss the law of multiple proportion or the percentage of iron in certain ores? Yet we can demand that attention if we approach the subject by an explanation of how our grandmothers used iron pots and kettles, black and unattractive, heavy and hard to handle, while all the time in the clay around there was an abundance of aluminum."

A textbook Naylor wrote, Introductory Chemistry with Household Applications (The Century Chemistry Series 1933) was particularly aimed at students in home economics courses, and went through several editions. Naylor retired in 1955, and lived in retirement for another 37 years, until her death in 1992.

== Legacy ==
Nuclear chemist Darleane C. Hoffman has credited a freshman-year course taught by Nellie May Naylor with inspiring her pursuit of a scientific career. The co-founder of the Hach Company, Kathryn "Kitty" Hach-Darrow, recalls finding similar inspiration in Naylor.

In 1994, Nellie May Naylor was honored with a brick in the "Plaza of Heroines" in front of Catt Hall on the Iowa State University campus in Ames, Iowa.

== See also ==
- List of centenarians (scientists and mathematicians)
