= F. William Sunderman =

American physician and scientist

- Sunderman in 2001
- Born: Frederick William Sunderman; October 23, 1898; Altoona, Pennsylvania, US
- Died: March 9, 2003 (aged 104); Philadelphia, Pennsylvania, US
- Education: Gettysburg College (BS, 1919); University of Pennsylvania (MD, 1923; MS, 1927; PhD 1929)
- Spouse(s): Clara Louise Bailey (d. 1972); Martha Lee Biscoe (1980–d. 1998)
- Children: 3
- Scientific career
- Fields: Laboratory medicine, clinical chemistry, toxicology

Frederick William Sunderman (October 23, 1898 – March 9, 2003) was an American physician and scientist who worked in the fields of laboratory medicine, clinical chemistry and toxicology. He completed his undergraduate education at Gettysburg College and earned an MD and PhD from the University of Pennsylvania. From 1936 to 1948 he carried out research on laboratory methods and quality control at the William Pepper Laboratory of the University of Pennsylvania. During World War II, he worked for the Manhattan Project. In 1949, he established a proficiency testing service for medical laboratories which operated until 1985. He was elected president of the American Society of Clinical Pathologists in 1950. In 1971, Sunderman founded the Annals of Clinical and Laboratory Science and would serve as editor-in-chief of the journal until 1999.

Sunderman taught at several medical schools, including the University of Pennsylvania School of Medicine and Hahnemann Medical College, where he was named professor emeritus in 1988. When Sunderman was 100, he was recognized as "America's Oldest Worker" in a contest sponsored by the United States government. He continued to work until shortly before his death at the age of 104.

== Early life and education ==
Sunderman was born on October 23, 1898, in Altoona, Pennsylvania, to William August Sunderman and Elizabeth Lehr Sunderman. He received an undergraduate degree in chemistry from Gettysburg College in 1919 and went on to pursue an MD at the University of Pennsylvania, graduating in 1923. He completed his internship at Pennsylvania Hospital and undertook a fellowship in research medicine from the University of Pennsylvania. He obtained an MS and PhD from Pennsylvania in 1927 and 1929 respectively.

== Career ==
In 1925, Sunderman began working as an instructor at the University of Pennsylvania School of Medicine. He taught there until 1947, eventually becoming an associate professor of research medicine. From 1936 to 1948, Sunderman served as the laboratory director for the clinical chemistry department of the university's William Pepper Laboratory, where he researched laboratory methods and quality control. During World War II, Sunderman also carried out toxicology research for the Manhattan Project; nickel toxicity would become one of his major research interests. Sunderman's work with William P. Belk at the William Pepper Laboratory led to the establishment of proficiency testing programs in US medical laboratories. In 1949, Sunderman founded a proficiency testing service which operated until 1985 and processed nearly two million specimens. In the same year, with Frederick Boerner, Sunderman published Normal Values in Clinical Medicine, a comprehensive text compiling reference ranges for 426 different laboratory parameters.

Throughout the late 1940s to the 1970s, Sunderman taught at several medical schools, including Temple University, the University of Texas, Jefferson Medical College, Emory University and the US Naval Medical School. He served as president of the American Society of Clinical Pathologists in 1950–1951 and became the first president of the Association of Clinical Scientists in 1956, serving in that role until 1958. In 1971 he became a professor at Hahnemann Medical College. The same year, he became the founding editor of the Annals of Clinical and Laboratory Science, where he served as editor-in-chief until 1999. He was named professor emeritus of pathology and laboratory medicine at Hahnemann Medical College in 1988.

In 1999, when Sunderman was 100, he was recognized as "America's Oldest Worker" in a contest sponsored by the United States government. He would continue to work until shortly before his death. Sunderman died at his home in Philadelphia, Pennsylvania, on March 9, 2003, at the age of 104.

== Personal life ==
Sunderman had three children with his first wife, Clara Louise Bailey. Two of their children died at a young age. The other, Frederick William Sunderman Jr., became an accomplished pathologist. Clara died in 1972, and Sunderman remarried to Martha Lee Biscoe in 1980. The couple remained together until Martha's death in 1998.

Sunderman had a lifelong interest in music and was a skilled violinist. He began studying violin as a young child, and headed a band named "Sunderman's Jazzarina" in college. In 1992, he performed a duet with his son Frederick Jr. at Carnegie Hall. He amassed a large collection of antique musical instruments. In his will, he bequeathed $14 million to Gettysburg College to establish the Sunderman Conservatory of Music.

In addition to his scientific works, Sunderman published books on music, travel, and photography, as well as an autobiography titled A Time To Remember.
