= Shen Qihan =

Chinese geologist (1922–2022)

- 沈其韩
- Born: 27 April 1922; Huaiyin County, Jiangsu, China
- Died: 27 November 2022 (aged 100); Beijing, China
- Education: Chongqing University
- Scientific career
- Fields: Geology
- Workplaces: Ministry of Geology and Mineral Resources; Chinese Academy of Geological Sciences

Chinese name
- Simplified Chinese: 沈其韩
- Traditional Chinese: 沈其韓
Transcriptions
Standard Mandarin
- Hanyu Pinyin: Shěn Qíhán

Shen Qihan (Chinese: 沈其韩; 27 April 1922 – 27 November 2022) was a Chinese geologist, and an academician of the Chinese Academy of Sciences.

== Biography ==
Shen was born in Huaiyin County (now Huaiyin District of Huai'an), Jiangsu, on 27 April 1922, while his ancestral home is in Haimen District of Nantong. During high school, his studies were interrupted by the Second Sino-Japanese War. In 1941, with the sponsorship of his elder cousin, he fled from Shanghai to Chongqing, where he was admitted to the Department of Geology, Chongqing University in the following year.

After graduating in April 1946, Shen became an intern and technician of Nanjing Central Geological Survey Institute, and moved to Nanjing Institute of Geology, Chinese Academy of Sciences in April 1949. He was an engineer of the Team 429, Hubei Daye Geological Department in January 1953 and subsequently Team 214, North China Geological Bureau in Yuanqu County, Shanxi. In October 1956, he was transferred to Beijing Department of Geology and the Ministry of Geology and Mineral Resources, where he successively worked as deputy chief engineer, researcher, director and doctoral supervisor of Geological Research Institute.

On 27 November 2022, Shen died in Beijing, at the age of 100.

== Publications ==
- 中国早前寒武纪麻粒岩 [Early Precambrian Granulite in China] (in Chinese). Beijing: Geological Publishing House. 1992. ISBN 9787116009950.
- 中国地层典 [The Paleoclimate of China] (in Chinese). Beijing: Geological Publishing House. 1996. ISBN 9787116022072.
- 中国变质地质图 [Metamorphic Geological Map of China] (in Chinese). Beijing: Geological Publishing House. 2016. ISBN 9787116095656.
- 中国区域变质岩及变质作用演化 [Regional Metamorphic Rocks and Metamorphic Evolution in China] (in Chinese). Beijing: Geological Publishing House. 2016. ISBN 9787116096011.
- 山东沂水杂岩的组成与地质演化 [The Composition and Geological Evolution of Shandong Yishui Complex] (in Chinese). Beijing: Geological Publishing House. 2000. ISBN 9787116030497.

== Honours and awards ==
- 1989 State Natural Science Award (Second Class)
- 1991 Member of the Chinese Academy of Sciences (CAS)
