= Darleane C. Hoffman =

American nuclear chemist (1926–2025)

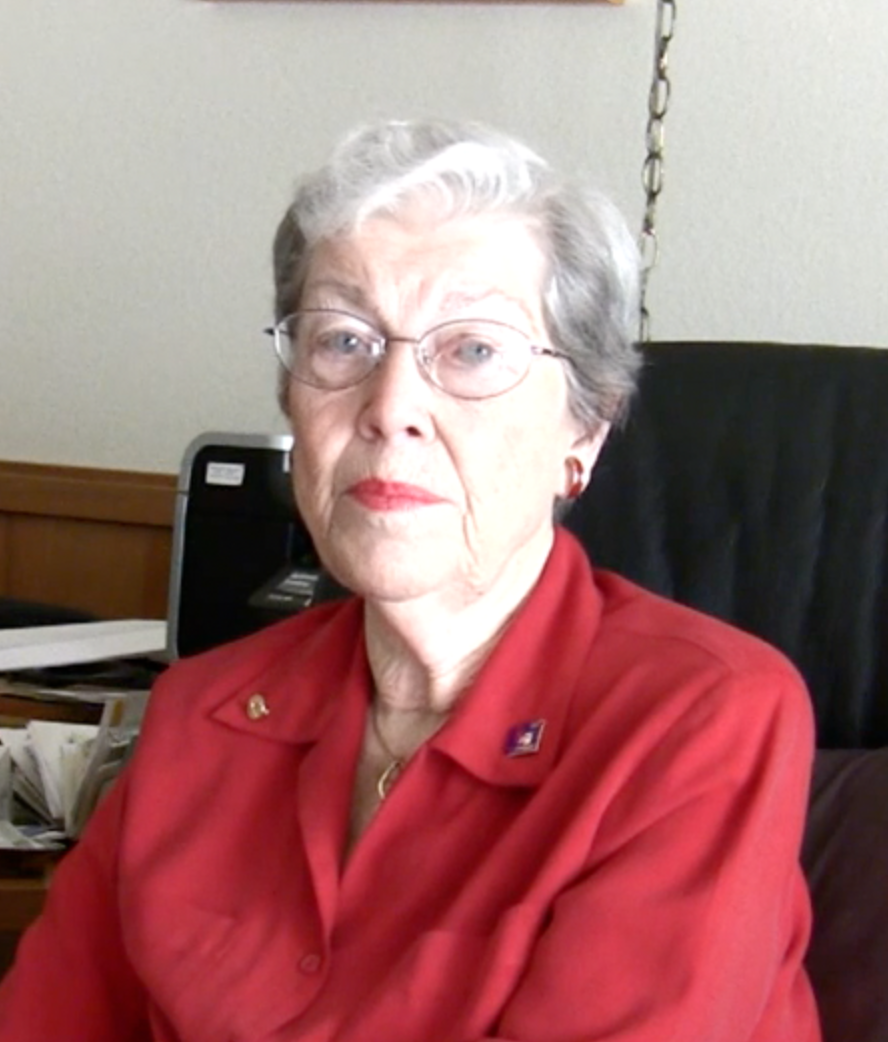
- Born: Darleane Christian; November 8, 1926; Terril, Iowa, U.S.
- Died: September 4, 2025 (aged 98); Menlo Park, California, U.S.
- Education: Iowa State University
- Spouse: Marvin Hoffman (m. 1951; died 2019)
- Children: 2
- Scientific career
- Fields: Nuclear chemistry
- Workplaces: Los Alamos National Laboratory; University of California, Berkeley

Darleane Christian Hoffman (November 8, 1926 – September 4, 2025) was an American nuclear chemist who was among the researchers who confirmed the existence of seaborgium, element 106. She was a faculty senior scientist in the Nuclear Science Division of Lawrence Berkeley National Laboratory and a professor in the graduate school at UC Berkeley. In acknowledgment of her many achievements, Discover magazine recognized her in 2002 as one of the 50 most important women in science.

== Early life and education ==
Darleane Christian was born on November 8, 1926, at home in the small town of Terril, Iowa, and was the daughter of Carl B. and Elverna Clute Christian. Her father was a mathematics teacher and superintendent of schools; her mother wrote and directed plays.

When she was a freshman in college at Iowa State College (now Iowa State University), she took a required chemistry course taught by Nellie May Naylor, and decided to pursue further study in that field. She earned a Bachelor of Science in 1948 and a PhD in 1951 in chemistry from Iowa State University.

== Career ==
Darleane C. Hoffman began her career as a chemist at Oak Ridge National Laboratory in 1952, and after an extensive delay where she was denied access to the laboratory because the human resources department refused to believe that a woman could be a chemist, she joined her husband in 1953 as a staff member at the Los Alamos Scientific Laboratory. She led the Chemistry and Nuclear Chemistry Division before leaving Los Alamos in 1984 to become a professor at UC Berkeley and led the Heavy Element Nuclear & Radiochemistry Group at Lawrence Berkeley National Laboratory. In 1991, she co-founded and became the first director of the Seaborg Institute for Transactinium Science at Lawrence Livermore National Laboratory, retiring in 1996 to become Senior Advisor and Charter Director.

Over her career, Hoffman studied the chemical and nuclear properties of transuranium elements and confirmed the existence of seaborgium.

== Personal life and death ==
Right after finishing her doctoral work, Darleane Christian married Marvin M. Hoffman, a physicist. He died in 2019. The Hoffmans had two children, both born at Los Alamos.

Darleane Hoffman died in Menlo Park, California on September 4, 2025, at the age of 98.

== Awards and memberships ==
- 2023 – Enrico Fermi Presidential Award
- 2014 – Los Alamos Medal
- 2010 – Hevesy Medal Award
- 2000 – Priestley Medal, (only the second woman to win the Priestley, after Mary L. Good in 1997)
- 1997 – National Medal of Science
- 1990 – Garvan-Olin Medal
- 1986 – Fellow of the American Physical Society
- 1983 – ACS Award for Nuclear Chemistry, (first woman to win the award)
- 1978 – Guggenheim Fellowship

She was a member of the Norwegian Academy of Science and Letters.
