= Berkelium oxide =

There are three berkelium oxides:

- Berkelium(II) oxide, a brittle gray solid
- Berkelium(III) oxide, a yellow-green solid
- Berkelium(IV) oxide, a brown solid
