= Berkelium(II) oxide =

Names
- Other names berkelium monoxide

Identifiers
CAS Number	70424-36-1
3D model (JSmol)	Interactive image
- InChI: InChI=1S/Bk.O/q+2;-2 Key: IUSJPWWAMNIJLG-UHFFFAOYSA-N
- SMILES: [Bk+2].[O-2]

Properties
Chemical formula	BkO
Molar mass	263 g·mol^{−1}
Appearance	gray solid
Density	g/cm^{3}
- Except where otherwise noted, data are given for materials in their standard state (at 25 °C [77 °F], 100 kPa). Infobox references

Berkelium(II) oxide is a binary inorganic compound of berkelium and oxygen with the chemical formula BkO.

== Physical properties ==
The compound is described to be a brittle gray solid.
