= Xenon compounds =

Chemical compounds containing at least one xenon atom

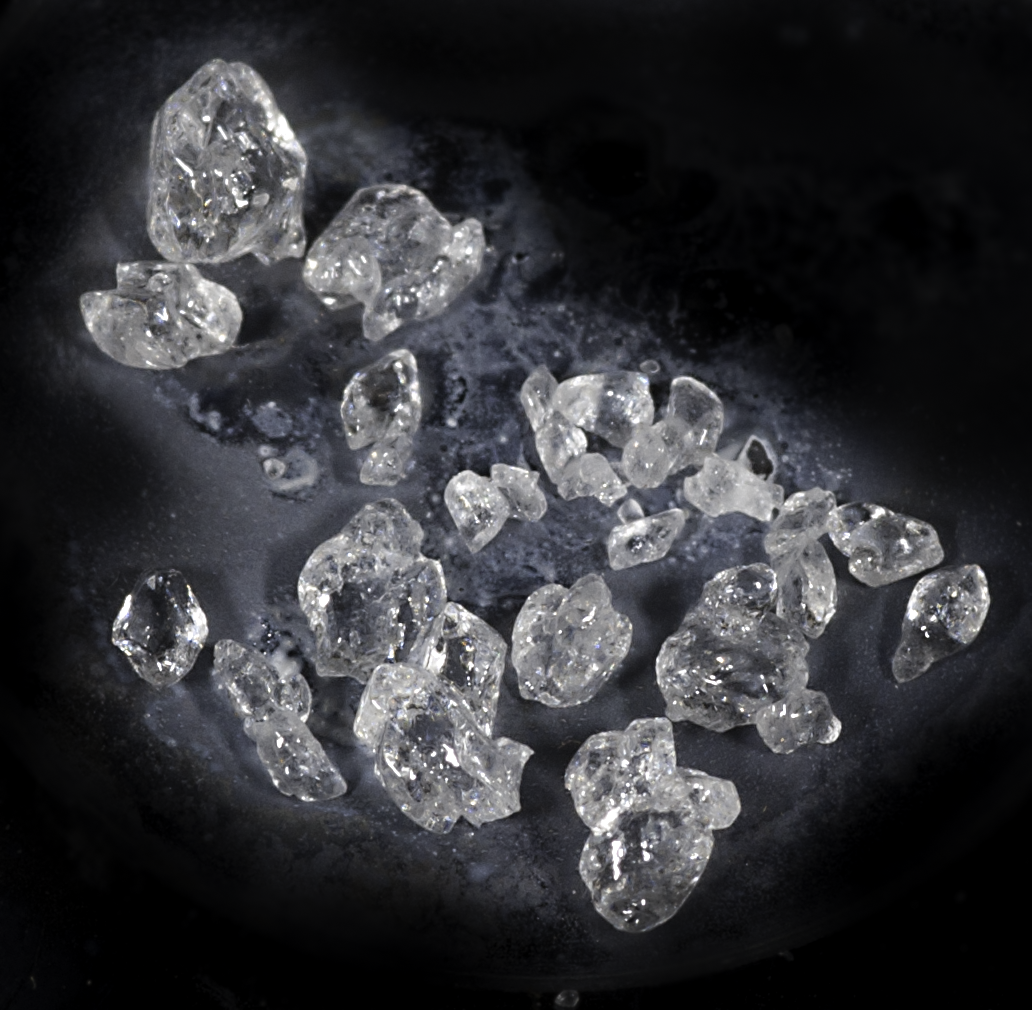
A sample of xenon difluoride, a compound of xenon

Xenon compounds are compounds containing the element xenon (Xe). After Neil Bartlett's discovery in 1962 that xenon can form chemical compounds, a large number of xenon compounds have been discovered and described. Almost all known xenon compounds contain atoms of electronegative fluorine or oxygen. The chemistry of xenon in each oxidation state is analogous to that of the neighboring element iodine in the immediately lower oxidation state.

== Halides ==
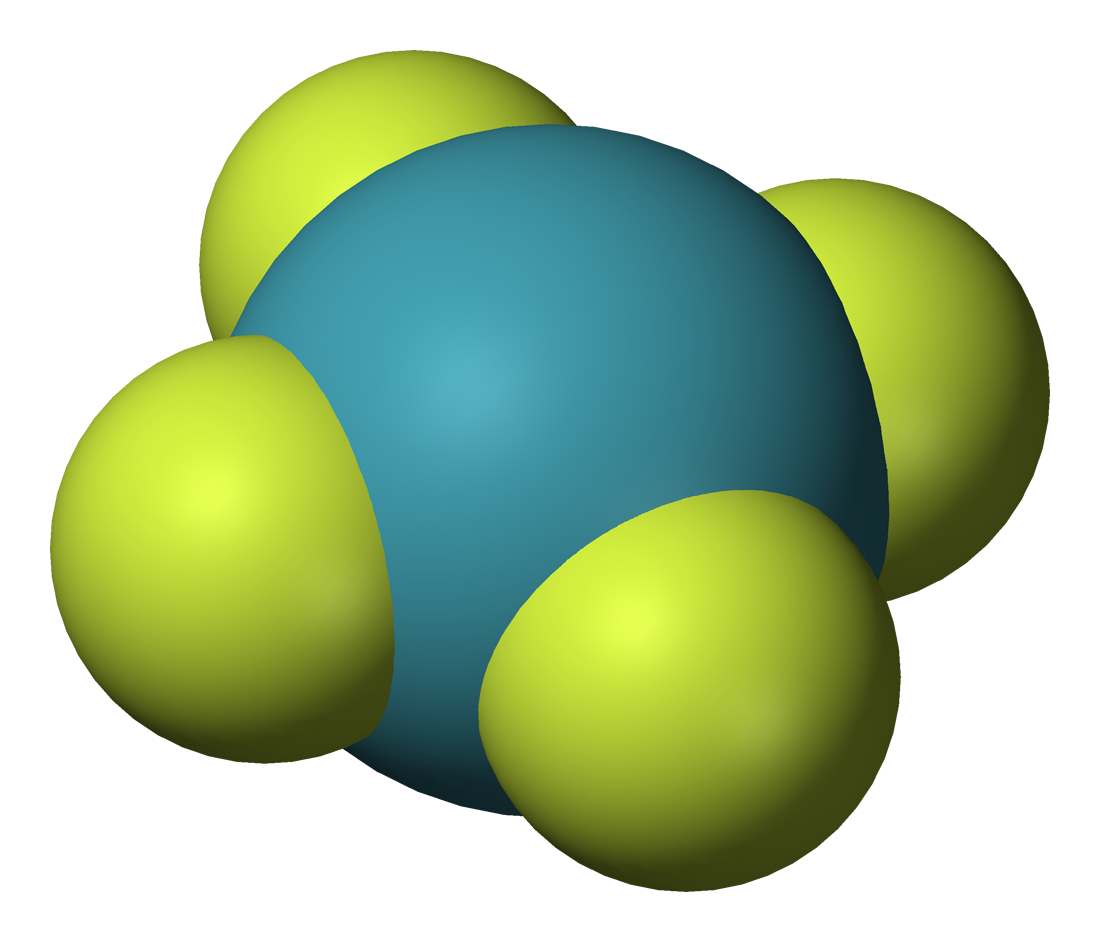
Xenon tetrafluoride

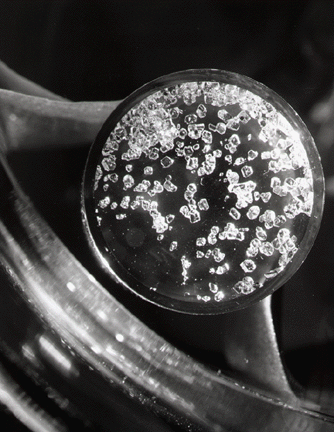
XeF_{4} crystals, 1962

Three fluorides are known: XeF_{2}, XeF_{4}, and XeF_{6}. These are the starting points for the synthesis of almost all xenon compounds. Neutral XeF is theorized to be unstable; however, fluoroxenonium pentafluoroplatinate (XeF^{+}PtF_{5}^{−}), more commonly known as xenon hexafluoroplatinate, has been described.

The solid, crystalline difluoride XeF_{2} is formed when a mixture of fluorine and xenon gases is exposed to ultraviolet light. The ultraviolet component of ordinary daylight is sufficient. Long-term heating of XeF_{2} at high temperatures under an NiF_{2} catalyst yields XeF_{6}. Pyrolysis of XeF_{6} in the presence of NaF yields high-purity XeF_{4}.

The xenon fluorides behave as both fluoride acceptors and fluoride donors, forming salts that contain such cations as XeF^{+} and Xe_{2}F_{3}^{+}, and anions such as XeF_{5}^{−}, XeF_{7}^{−}, and XeF_{8}^{2−}. The green, paramagnetic Xe_{2}^{+} is formed by the reduction of XeF_{2} by xenon gas.

XeF_{2} also forms coordination complexes with transition metal ions. More than 30 such complexes have been synthesized and characterized.

Whereas the xenon fluorides are well characterized, the other halides are not. Xenon dichloride, formed by the high-frequency irradiation of a mixture of xenon, fluorine, and silicon or carbon tetrachloride, is reported to be an endothermic, colorless, crystalline compound that decomposes into the elements at 80 °C. However, XeCl_{2} may be merely a van der Waals molecule of weakly bound Xe atoms and Cl_{2} molecules and not a real compound. Theoretical calculations indicate that the linear molecule XeCl_{2} is less stable than the van der Waals complex. Xenon tetrachloride and xenon dibromide are sufficiently more unstable that they cannot be synthesized by chemical reactions. They were created by radioactive decay of ^{129}ICl_{4}^{−} and ^{129}IBr_{2}^{−}, respectively.

== Oxides and oxohalides ==
Three oxides of xenon are known: xenon trioxide (XeO_{3}) and xenon tetroxide (XeO_{4}), both of which are dangerously explosive and powerful oxidizing agents, and xenon dioxide (XeO_{2}), which was reported in 2011 with a coordination number of four. XeO_{2} forms when xenon tetrafluoride is poured over ice. Its crystal structure may allow it to replace silicon in silicate minerals. The XeOO^{+} cation has been identified by infrared spectroscopy in solid argon.

Xenon does not react with oxygen directly; the trioxide is formed by the hydrolysis of XeF_{6}:

XeF_{6} + 3 H_{2}O → XeO_{3} + 6 HF

XeO_{3} is weakly acidic, dissolving in alkali to form unstable xenate salts containing the HXeO_{4}^{−} anion. These unstable salts easily disproportionate into xenon gas and perxenate salts, containing the XeO_{6}^{4−} anion.

Barium perxenate, when treated with concentrated sulfuric acid, yields gaseous xenon tetroxide:

Ba_{2}XeO_{6} + 2 H_{2}SO_{4} → 2 BaSO_{4} + 2 H_{2}O + XeO_{4}

To prevent decomposition, the xenon tetroxide thus formed is quickly cooled into a pale-yellow solid. It explodes above −35.9 °C (237.2 K) into xenon and oxygen gas, but is otherwise stable.

A number of xenon oxyfluorides are known, including XeOF_{2}, XeOF_{4}, XeO_{2}F_{2}, and XeO_{3}F_{2}. XeOF_{2} is formed by reacting oxygen difluoride with xenon gas at low temperatures. It may also be obtained by partial hydrolysis of XeF_{4}. It disproportionates at −20 °C (253 K) into XeF_{2} and XeO_{2}F_{2}. XeOF_{4} is formed by the partial hydrolysis of XeF_{6}...

XeF_{6} + H_{2}O → XeOF_{4} + 2 HF

...or the reaction of XeF_{6} with sodium perxenate, Na_{4}XeO_{6}. The latter reaction also produces a small amount of XeO_{3}F_{2}.

XeO_{2}F_{2} is also formed by partial hydrolysis of XeF_{6}.

XeF_{6} + 2 H_{2}O → XeO_{2}F_{2} + 4 HF

XeOF_{4} reacts with CsF to form the XeOF_{5}^{−} anion, while XeOF_{3} reacts with the alkali metal fluorides KF, RbF and CsF to form the XeOF_{4}^{−} anion.

== Other compounds ==
Xenon directly bonds with a less-electronegative element than fluorine or oxygen, particularly carbon. Electron-withdrawing groups, such as groups with fluorine substitution, are necessary to stabilize these compounds. Numerous such compounds have been characterized, including:

- C_{6}F_{5}-Xe^{+}-N≡C-CH_{3}, where C_{6}F_{5} is the pentafluorophenyl group.
- (C_{6}F_{5})_{2}Xe
- C_{6}F_{5}-Xe-C≡N
- C_{6}F_{5}-Xe-F
- C_{6}F_{5}-Xe-Cl
- C_{2}F_{5}-C≡C-Xe^{+}
- (CH_{3})_{3}C-C≡C-Xe^{+}
- C_{6}F_{5}-XeF_{2}^{+}
- (C_{6}F_{5}Xe)_{2}Cl^{+}

Other compounds containing xenon bonded with a less-electronegative element include F-Xe-N(SO_{2}F)_{2} and F-Xe-BF_{2}. The latter is synthesized from dioxygenyl tetrafluoroborate, O_{2}BF_{4}, at −100 °C (173 K).

An unusual ion containing xenon is the tetraxenonogold(II) cation, AuXe_{4}^{2+}, which contains Xe–Au bonds. This ion occurs in the compound AuXe_{4}(Sb_{2}F_{11})_{2}, and is remarkable in having direct chemical bonds between two notoriously unreactive atoms, xenon and gold, with xenon acting as a transition metal ligand. A similar mercury complex (HgXe)(Sb_{3}F_{17}) (formulated as [HgXe^{2+}][Sb_{2}F_{11}^{−}][SbF_{6}^{−}]) is also known. Xenon reversibly complexes gaseous M(CO)_{5}, where M=Cr, Mo, or W. p-block metals also bind noble gases: XeBeO has been observed spectroscopically and both XeBeS and FXeBO are predicted stable.

The compound Xe_{2}Sb_{2}F_{11} contains a Xe–Xe bond, the longest element-element bond known (308.71 pm = 3.0871 Å).

In 1995, M. Räsänen and co-workers, scientists at the University of Helsinki in Finland, announced the preparation of xenon dihydride (HXeH), and later xenon hydride-hydroxide (HXeOH), hydroxenoacetylene (HXeCCH), and other Xe-containing molecules. In 2008, Khriachtchev et al. reported the preparation of HXeOXeH by the photolysis of water within a cryogenic xenon matrix. Deuterated molecules, HXeOD and DXeOH, have also been produced.

== Clathrates and excimers ==
In addition to compounds where xenon forms a chemical bond, xenon can form clathrates—substances where xenon atoms or pairs are trapped by the crystalline lattice of another compound. One example is xenon hydrate (Xe·5 3/4H_{2}O), where xenon atoms occupy vacancies in a lattice of water molecules. This clathrate has a melting point of 24 °C. The deuterated version of this hydrate has also been produced. Another example is xenon hydride (Xe(H_{2})_{8}), in which xenon pairs (dimers) are trapped inside solid hydrogen. Such clathrate hydrates can occur naturally under conditions of high pressure, such as in Lake Vostok underneath the Antarctic ice sheet. Clathrate formation can be used to fractionally distill xenon, argon and krypton.

Xenon can also form endohedral fullerene compounds, where a xenon atom is trapped inside a fullerene molecule. The xenon atom trapped in the fullerene can be observed by ^{129}Xe nuclear magnetic resonance (NMR) spectroscopy. Through the sensitive chemical shift of the xenon atom to its environment, chemical reactions on the fullerene molecule can be analyzed. These observations are not without caveat, however, because the xenon atom has an electronic influence on the reactivity of the fullerene.

When xenon atoms are in the ground energy state, they repel each other and will not form a bond. When xenon atoms becomes energized, however, they can form an excimer (excited dimer) until the electrons return to the ground state. This entity is formed because the xenon atom tends to complete the outermost electron shell by adding an electron from a neighboring xenon atom. The typical lifetime of a xenon excimer is 1–5 nanoseconds, and the decay releases photons with wavelengths of about 150 and 173 nm. Xenon can also form excimers with other elements, such as the halogens bromine, chlorine, and fluorine.

== Xenonium ==
The xenonium ion, XeH^{+}, is an onium ion, consisting of protonated xenon. Although the existence of xenonium salts has not been proven, the isolated XeH^{+} ion is known.

== Cultural references ==
In the novel Project Hail Mary by Andy Weir and its film adaption, the alien species prominent in the story utilize a xenon compound that the protagonist names "xenonite". This material is made by the mixing of two liquids, which cure to form a nearly indestructible material. Additives are used to change its color, transparency, and sound properties. The chemical composition of xenonite or its precursors is not revealed.
