= Tetramethylammonium pentafluoroxenate =

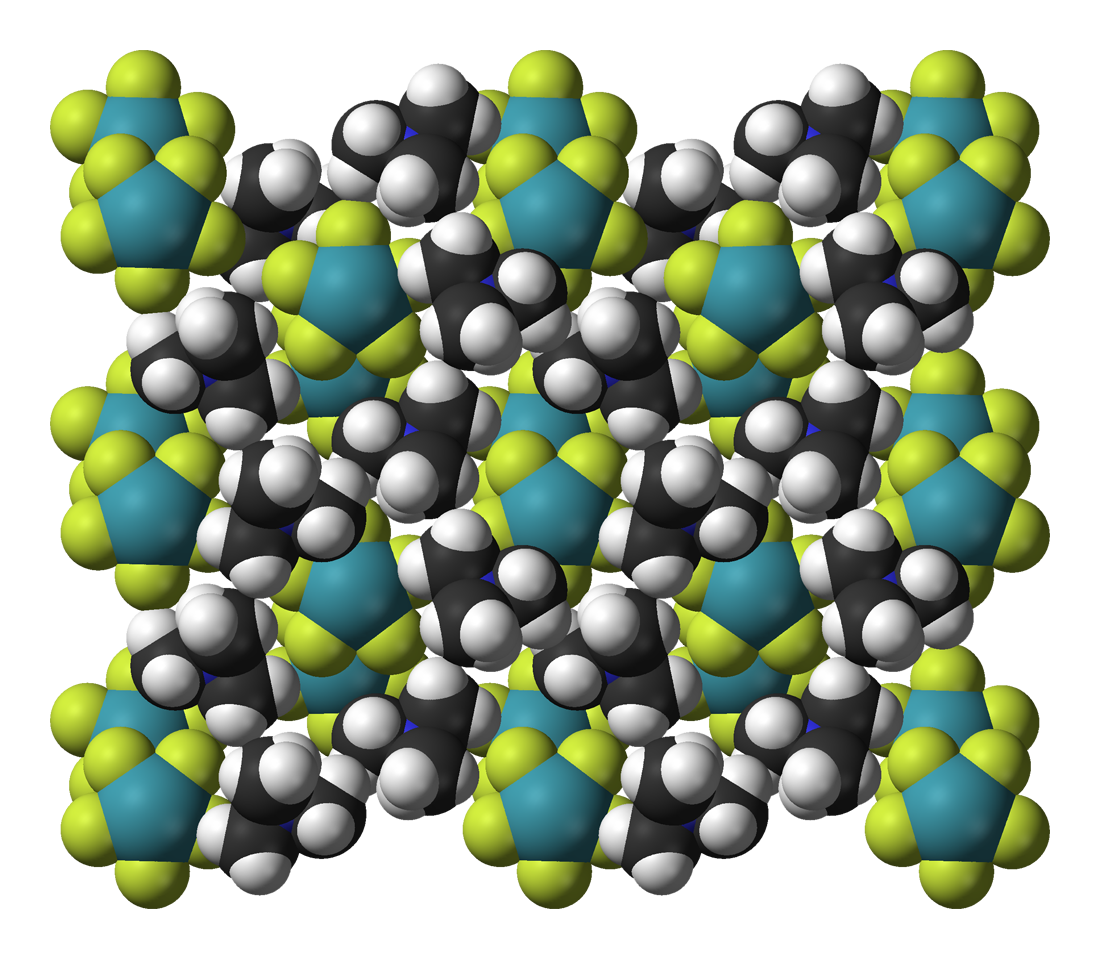

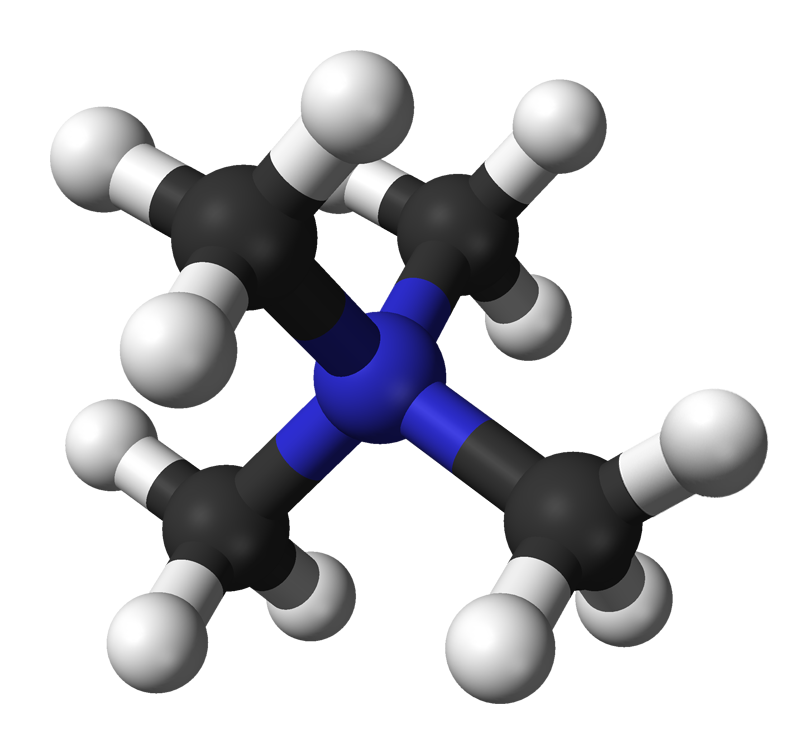

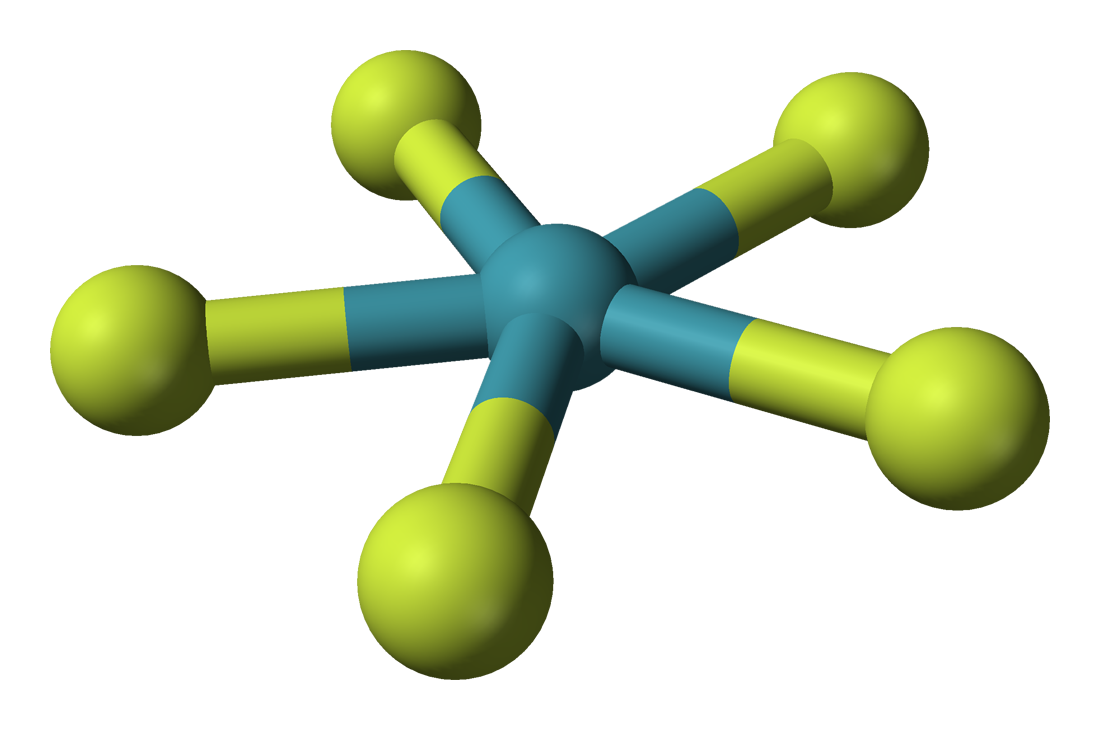

Names
- IUPAC name N,N,N-Trimethylmethanaminium pentafluoridoxenonate(−)
- Other names Tetramethylammonium pentafluoroxenate(IV)

Identifiers
CAS Number	133042-40-7
3D model (JSmol)	Interactive image
ChemSpider	21781745
- InChI: InChI=1S/C4H12N.F5Xe/c1-5(2,3)4;1-6(2,3,4)5/h1-4H3;/q+1;-1 Key: DNTNABLTOUYNBO-UHFFFAOYSA-N
- SMILES: C[N+](C)(C)C.F[Xe-](F)(F)(F)F

Properties
Chemical formula	[N(CH_{3})_{4}][XeF_{5}]
Molar mass	300.4308 g/mol
- Except where otherwise noted, data are given for materials in their standard state (at 25 °C [77 °F], 100 kPa). verify (what is ?) Infobox references

Tetramethylammonium pentafluoroxenate is a chemical compound with the chemical formula [N(CH_{3})_{4}]^{+}[XeF_{5}]^{−}. This salt consists of tetramethylammonium cations [N(CH_{3})_{4}]^{+} and pentafluoroxenate(IV) anions [XeF_{5}]^{−}. The [XeF_{5}]^{−} ion was the first example of a pentagonal planar molecular geometry AX_{5}E_{2} species. It was prepared by the reaction of [N(CH_{3})_{4}]F with xenon tetrafluoride, [N(CH_{3})_{4}]F being chosen because it can be prepared in anhydrous form and is readily soluble in organic solvents. The anion is planar, with the fluorine atoms in a slightly distorted pentagonal coordination (Xe–F bond lengths 197.9–203.4 pm, and F–X–F bond angles 71.5°–72.3°). Other salts have been prepared with sodium, caesium and rubidium, and vibrational spectra show that these contain the same planar ion. The isolated anion has the point group of D_{5h}.

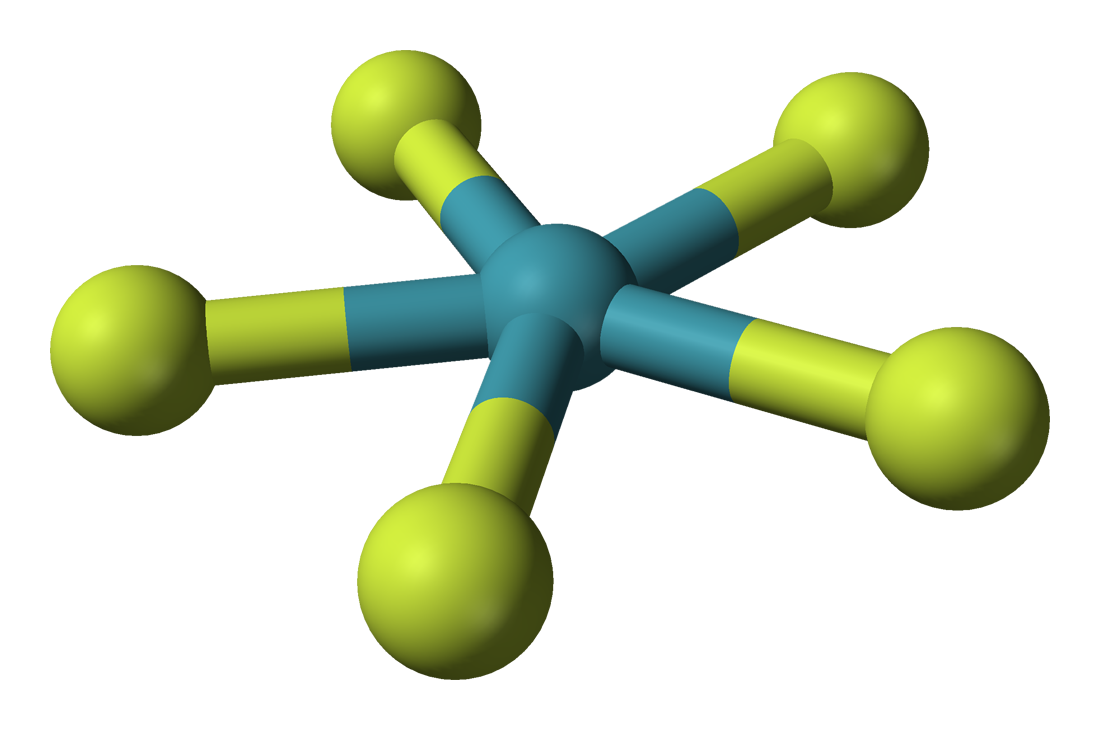
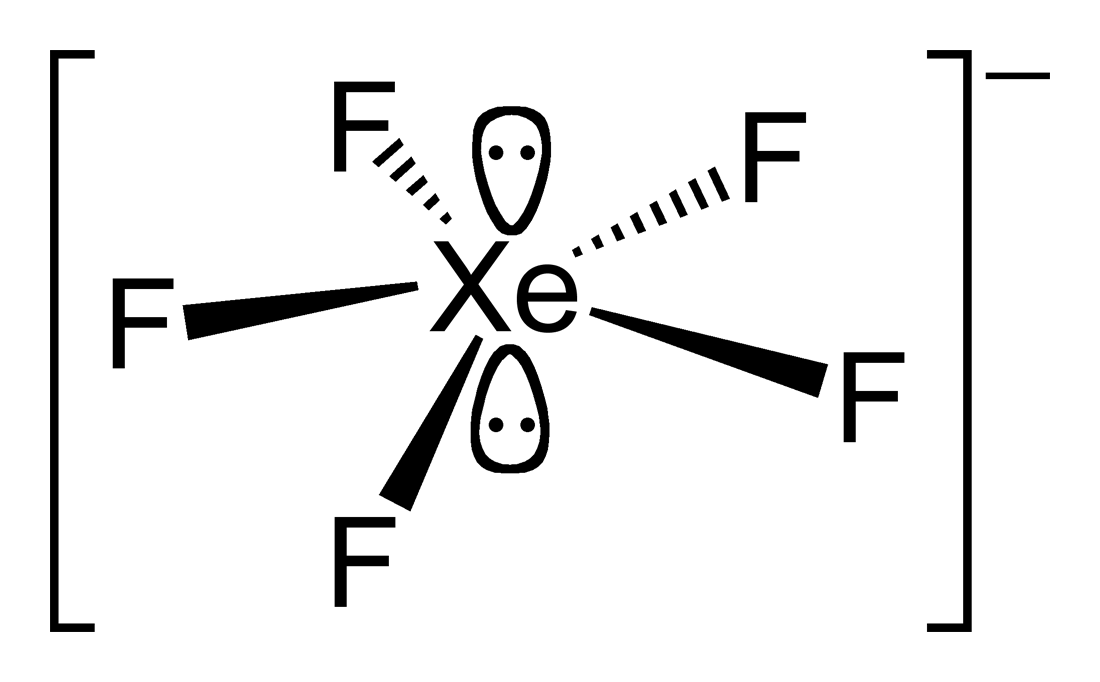
