= Xenon dibromide =

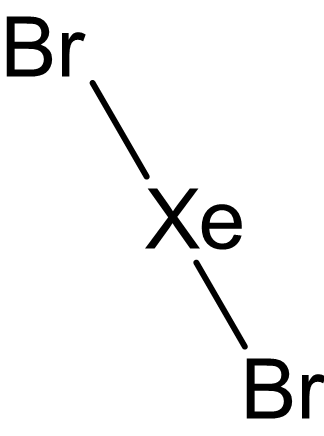

Names
- IUPAC name Dibromoxenon
- Other names: Xenon(II) bromide

Identifiers
CAS Number	73378-57-1
3D model (JSmol)	Interactive image
ChemSpider	2342693
PubChem CID	3085953
CompTox Dashboard (EPA)	DTXSID8072744
- InChI: InChI=1S/Br2Xe/c1-3-2 Key: ILFGODHCYAHKOR-UHFFFAOYSA-N
- SMILES: Br[Xe]Br

Properties
Chemical formula	XeBr_{2}
Molar mass	291.10 g/mol

Thermochemistry
Gibbs free energy (Δ_{f}G^{⦵})	32.5 kJ·mol^{−1}

Related compounds
Other anions	Xenon difluoride Xenon dichloride
- Except where otherwise noted, data are given for materials in their standard state (at 25 °C [77 °F], 100 kPa). Infobox references

Xenon dibromide is an unstable chemical compound with the chemical formula XeBr_{2}. It has been produced by a decay technique involving the decomposition of iodine-129:

^{129}IBr_{2}^{–} → XeBr_{2} + e^{–}

Attempts to prepare this compound by combining elemental xenon and bromine only resulted in the XeBr radical. This compound is expected to be less stable than xenon difluoride and xenon dichloride. It is also expected to decompose to xenon and bromine.

Xenon tetrachloride is another noble-gas halide that can only be synthesized by the decay technique.
