= Pentagonal planar molecular geometry =

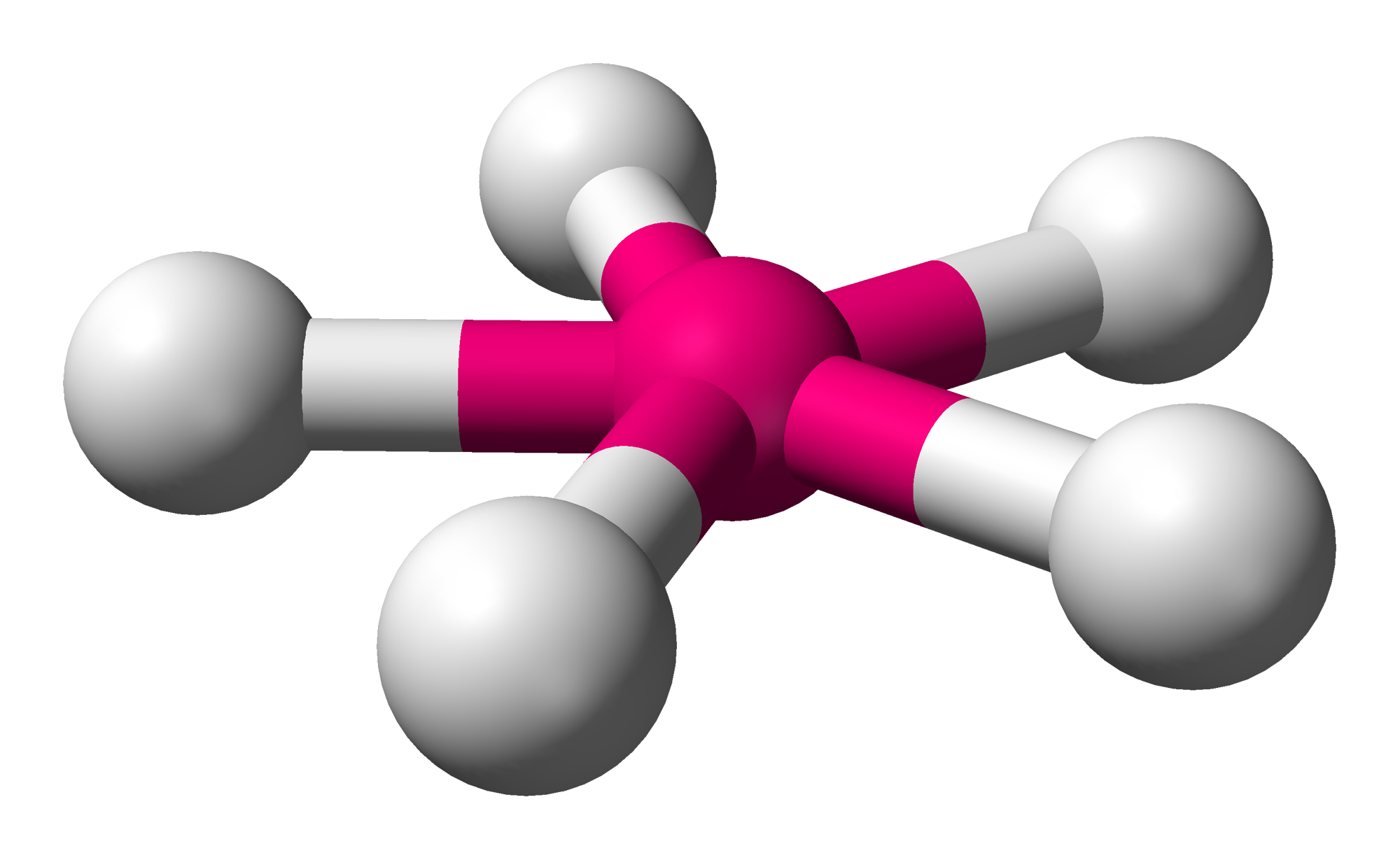
- Examples: [XeF_{5}]^{−}
- Point group: D_{5h}
- Coordination number: 5
- Bond angle(s): 72°
- μ (Polarity): 0

In chemistry, the pentagonal planar molecular geometry describes the shape of compounds where five atoms, groups of atoms, or ligands are arranged around a central atom, defining the vertices of a pentagon.

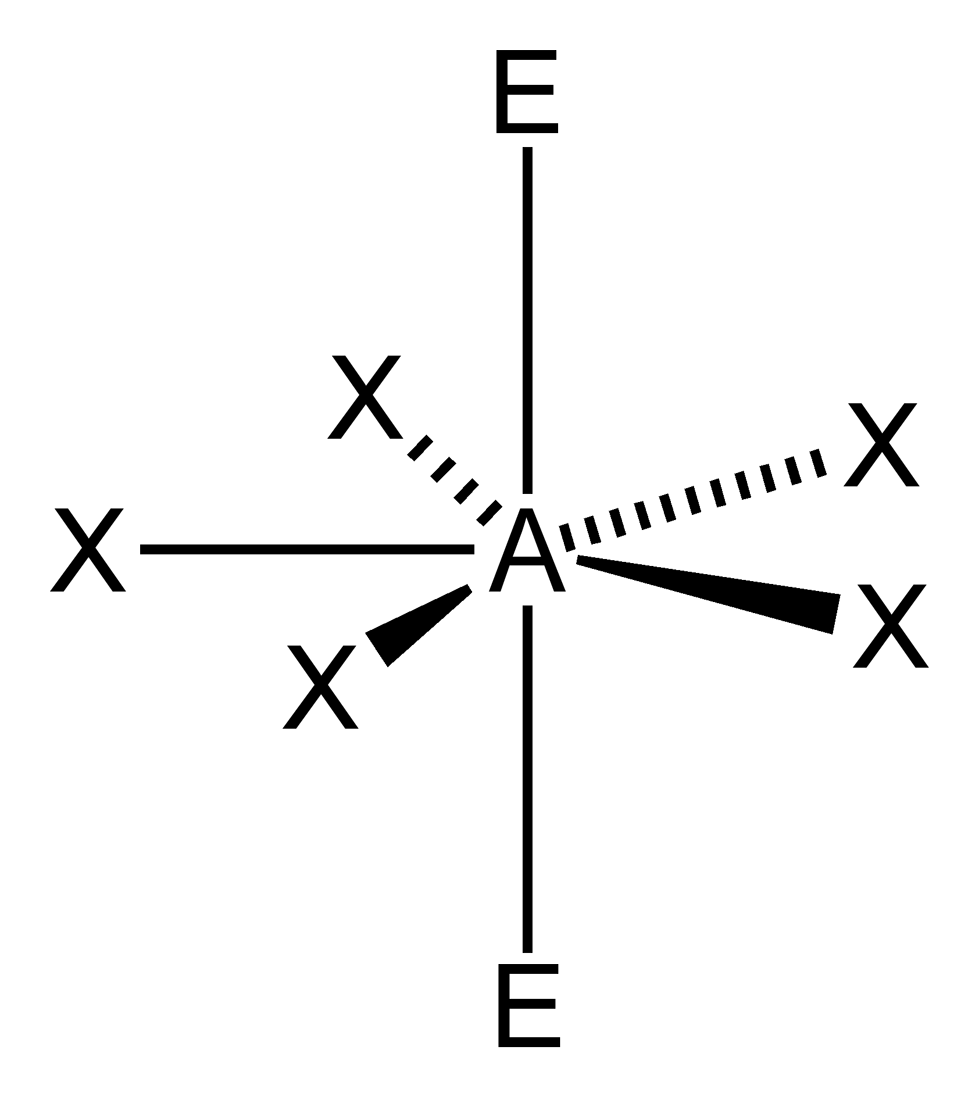
AX_{5}E_{2}

== Examples ==
The only two pentagonal planar species known are the isoelectronic (nine valence electrons) ions [XeF_{5}]^{−} (pentafluoroxenate(IV)) and [IF_{5}]^{2−} (pentafluoroiodate(III)). Both are derived from the pentagonal bipyramid with two lone pairs occupying the apical positions and the five fluorine atoms all equatorial.
