= Xenon tetrachloride =

Chemical compound

Identifiers
CAS Number	14989-42-5
3D model (JSmol)	Interactive image
PubChem CID	149605668
- InChI: InChI=1S/Cl4Xe/c1-5(2,3)4 Key: YPLOYFASLUPKHY-UHFFFAOYSA-N
- SMILES: Cl[Xe](Cl)(Cl)Cl

Properties
Chemical formula	Cl_{4}Xe
Molar mass	273.09 g·mol^{−1}

Related compounds
Related compounds	XeF_{4}, XeCl_{2}, XeCl
- Except where otherwise noted, data are given for materials in their standard state (at 25 °C [77 °F], 100 kPa). Infobox references

Xenon tetrachloride is an unstable inorganic compound with the chemical formula XeCl_{4}. Unlike most other noble gas/halide compounds, it cannot be synthesized by simply combining the elements, by using a more-active halogenating agent, or by substitution of other halides on tetrahaloxenon compounds. Instead, a decay technique can be used, starting with K^{129}ICl_{4}. The iodine-129 atom of the ^{129}ICl^{–}_{4} covalent cluster is radioactive and undergoes beta decay to become xenon-129. The resulting XeCl_{4} molecule has a square planar molecular geometry analogous to xenon tetrafluoride.

Alternately, the product can be obtained by subjecting the elements to an electric discharge.

Xenon dibromide is another noble-gas halide that can only be synthesized by the decay technique.
