= Xenon difluoride =

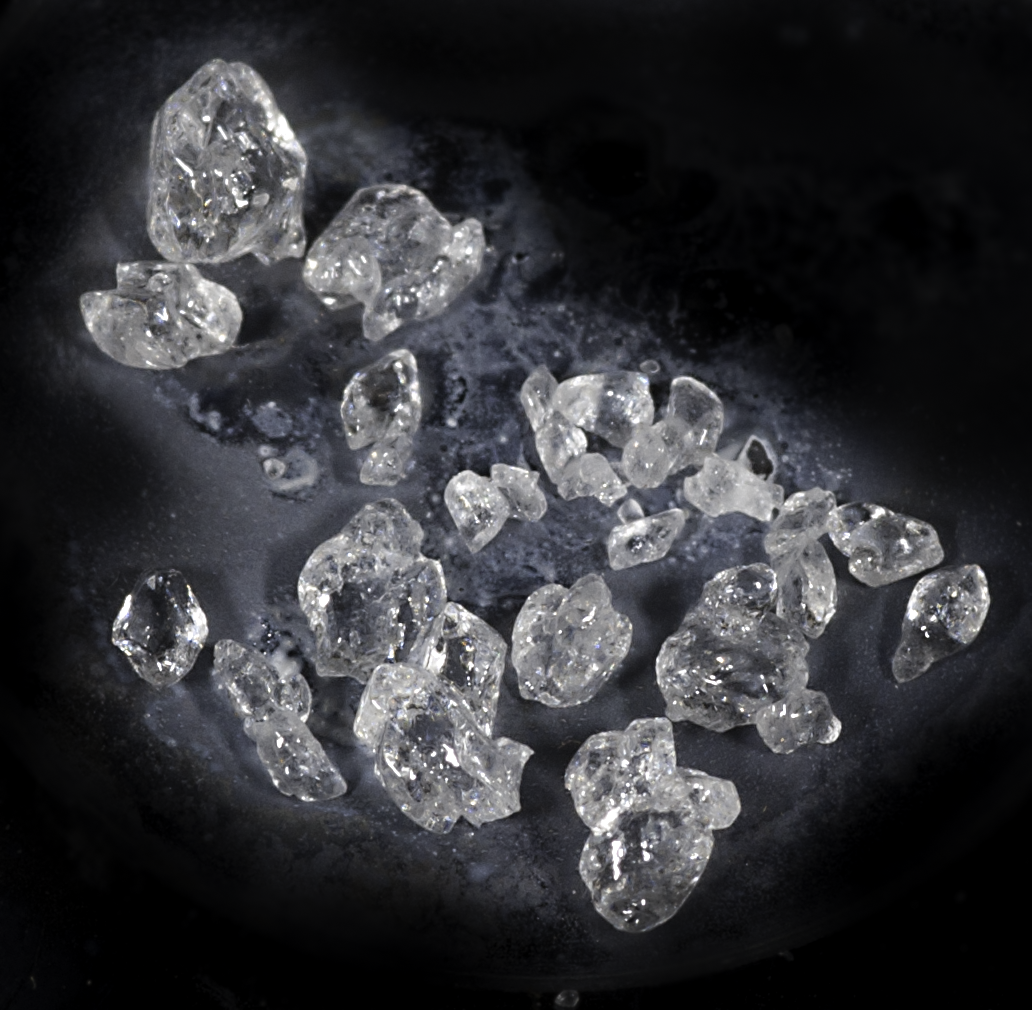
- XeF_{2} crystals. 1962.

- Xenon difluoride

- Xenon difluoride

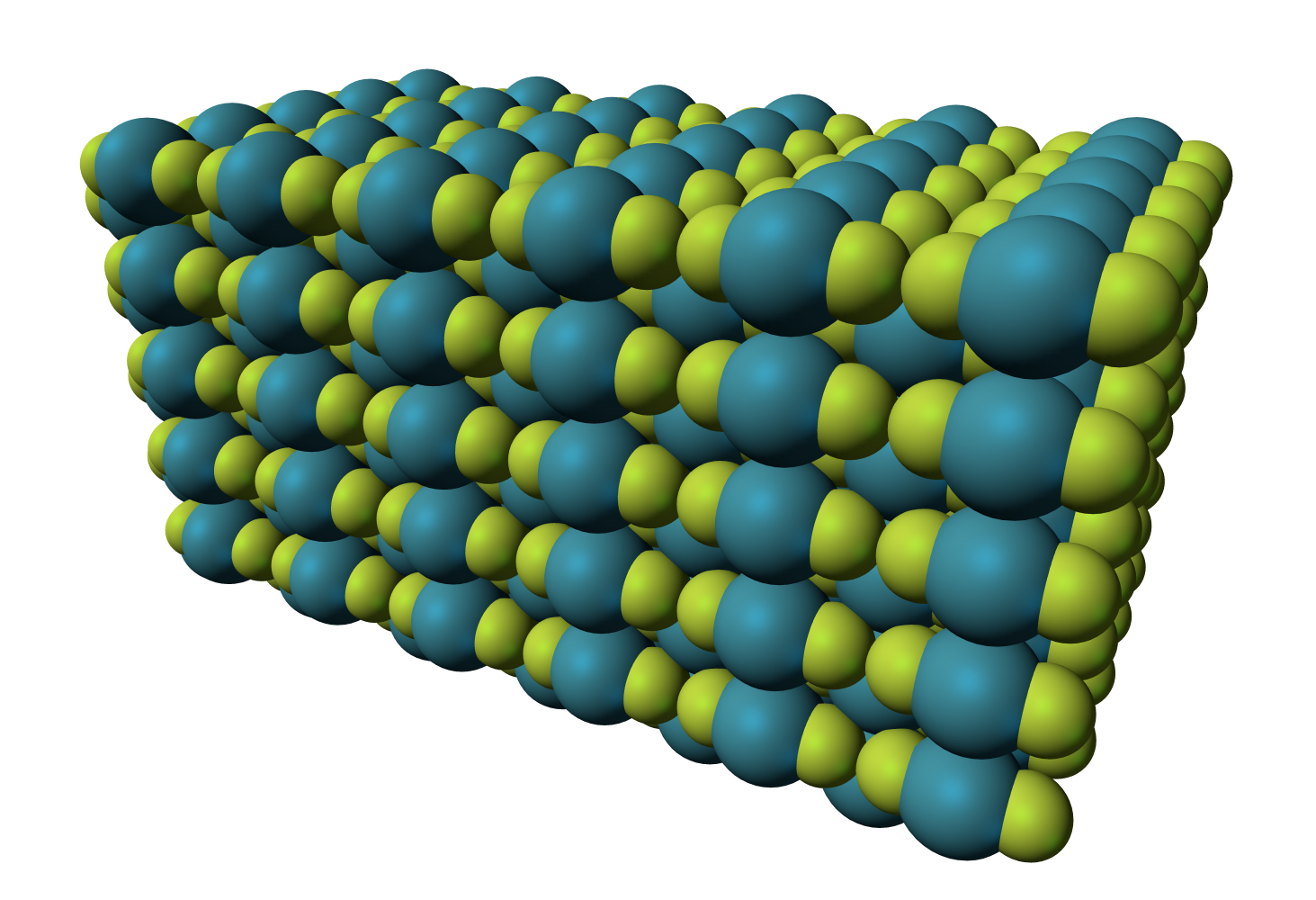

Names
- IUPAC names Xenon difluoride Xenon(II) fluoride

Identifiers
CAS Number	13709-36-9
3D model (JSmol)	Interactive image
ChemSpider	75497
ECHA InfoCard	100.033.850
PubChem CID	83674
UNII	6POJ14981P
CompTox Dashboard (EPA)	DTXSID7065590
- InChI: InChI=1S/F2Xe/c1-3-2 Key: IGELFKKMDLGCJO-UHFFFAOYSA-N; InChI=1/F2Xe/c1-3-2 Key: IGELFKKMDLGCJO-UHFFFAOYAE
- SMILES: F[Xe]F

Properties
Chemical formula	F_{2}Xe
Molar mass	169.290 g·mol^{−1}
Appearance	White solid
Density	4.32 g/cm^{3}, solid
Melting point	128.6 °C (263.5 °F; 401.8 K)
Solubility in water	25 g/L (0 °C, slow decomposition)
Vapor pressure	6.0×10^{2} Pa

Structure
Crystal structure	parallel linear XeF_{2} units
Molecular shape	Linear
Dipole moment	0 D

Thermochemistry
Std molar entropy (S^{⦵}_{298})	254 J·mol^{−1}·K^{−1}
Std enthalpy of formation (Δ_{f}H^{⦵}_{298})	−108 kJ·mol^{−1}

Hazards
- Occupational safety and health (OHS/OSH)
Main hazards	Corrosive to exposed tissues. Releases toxic compounds on contact with moisture.
- GHS labelling
Pictograms	(GHS05: Corrosive) (GHS06: Toxic) (GHS03: Oxidizing)
Signal word	Danger
Hazard statements	H272, H301, H314, H330
Precautionary statements	P210, P220, P221, P260, P264, P270, P271, P280, P284, P301+P310+P330, P303+P361+P353, P304+P340+P310, P305+P351+P338, P331, P363, P370+P378, P403+P233, P405, P501
NFPA 704 (fire diamond)	3 0 1 OX
Safety data sheet (SDS)	PELCHEM MSDS

Related compounds
Other anions	Xenon dichloride Xenon dibromide
Other cations	Krypton difluoride Radon difluoride
Related compounds	Xenon tetrafluoride Xenon hexafluoride
- Except where otherwise noted, data are given for materials in their standard state (at 25 °C [77 °F], 100 kPa). verify (what is ?) Infobox references

Xenon difluoride is a powerful fluorinating agent with the chemical formula XeF_{2}, and one of the most stable xenon compounds. Like most covalent inorganic fluorides, it is moisture-sensitive. It gradually decomposes on contact with water vapor, but is otherwise stable in storage. Xenon difluoride is a dense, colourless crystalline solid.

It has a nauseating odour and low vapor pressure.

== Structure ==
Xenon difluoride is a linear molecule with an Xe–F bond length of 197.73±0.15 pm in the vapor stage, and 200 pm in the solid phase. The packing arrangement in solid XeF_{2} shows that the fluorine atoms of neighbouring molecules avoid the equatorial region of each XeF_{2} molecule. This agrees with the prediction of VSEPR theory, which predicts that there are 3 pairs of non-bonding electrons around the equatorial region of the xenon atom.

At high pressures, novel, polymeric forms of xenon difluoride can be obtained. Under a pressure of ~50 GPa, XeF_{2} transforms into a semiconductor consisting of XeF_{4} units linked in a two-dimensional structure, like graphite. At even higher pressures, above 70 GPa, it becomes metallic, forming a three-dimensional structure containing XeF_{8} units. A 2011 theoretical study cast doubt on these experimental results, suggesting that xenon difluoride remains stable up to 200 GPa, at which point it dissociates into an ionic solid.

The Xe–F bonds are weak. XeF_{2} has a total bond energy of 267.8 kJ/mol (64.0 kcal/mol), with first and second bond energies of 184.1 kJ/mol (44.0 kcal/mol) and 83.68 kJ/mol (20.00 kcal/mol), respectively. However, XeF_{2} is much more robust than KrF_{2}, which has a total bond energy of only 92.05 kJ/mol (22.00 kcal/mol).

== Chemistry ==
=== Synthesis ===
Synthesis proceeds by the simple reaction:

Xe + F_{2} → XeF_{2}

The reaction needs heat, irradiation, or an electrical discharge. The product is a solid. It is purified by fractional distillation or selective condensation using a vacuum line.

The first published report of XeF_{2} was in October 1962 by Chernick, et al. However, though published later, XeF_{2} was probably first created by Rudolf Hoppe at the University of Münster, Germany, in early 1962, by reacting fluorine and xenon gas mixtures in an electrical discharge. Shortly after these reports, Weeks, Chernick, and Matheson of Argonne National Laboratory reported the synthesis of XeF_{2} using an all-nickel system with transparent alumina windows, in which equal parts xenon and fluorine gases react at low pressure upon irradiation by an ultraviolet source to give XeF_{2}. Williamson reported that the reaction works equally well at atmospheric pressure in a dry Pyrex glass bulb using sunlight as a source. It was noted that the synthesis worked even on cloudy days.

In the previous syntheses the fluorine gas reactant had been purified to remove hydrogen fluoride. Šmalc and Lutar found that if this step is skipped the reaction rate proceeds at four times the original rate.

In 1965, it was also synthesized by reacting xenon gas with dioxygen difluoride.

=== Solubility ===
XeF_{2} is soluble in interhalogen solvents such as BrF_{5}, BrF_{3}, IF_{5}, and others like anhydrous hydrogen fluoride, and acetonitrile, without reduction or oxidation. Solubility in hydrogen fluoride is high, at 167 g per 100 g HF at 29.95 °C.

=== Derived xenon compounds ===
Other xenon compounds may be derived from xenon difluoride. The unstable organoxenon compound Xe(CF_{3})_{2} can be made by irradiating hexafluoroethane to generate CF^{•}_{3} radicals and passing the gas over XeF_{2}. The resulting waxy white solid decomposes completely within 4 hours at room temperature.

The XeF^{+} cation is formed by combining xenon difluoride with a strong fluoride acceptor, such as an excess of liquid antimony pentafluoride (SbF_{5}):

XeF_{2} + SbF_{5} → XeF^{+} + SbF^{−}_{6}

Adding xenon gas to this pale yellow solution at a pressure of 2–3 atmospheres produces a green solution containing the paramagnetic Xe^{+}_{2} ion, which contains a Xe−Xe bond: ("apf" denotes solution in liquid SbF_{5})

3 Xe_{(g)} + XeF^{+}_{(apf)} + SbF_{5}_{(l)} ⇌ 2 Xe^{+}_{2}_{(apf)} + SbF^{−}_{6}_{(apf)}

This reaction is reversible; removing xenon gas from the solution causes the Xe^{+}_{2} ion to revert to xenon gas and XeF^{+}, and the color of the solution returns to a pale yellow.

In the presence of liquid HF, dark green crystals can be precipitated from the green solution at −30 °C:

Xe^{+}_{2}_{(apf)} + 4 SbF^{−}_{6}_{(apf)} → Xe^{+}_{2}Sb_{4}F^{−}_{21}_{(s)} + 3 F^{−}_{(apf)}

X-ray crystallography indicates that the Xe–Xe bond length in this compound is 309 pm, indicating a very weak bond. The Xe^{+}_{2} ion is isoelectronic with the I^{−}_{2} ion, which is also dark green.

=== Coordination chemistry ===
Bonding in the XeF_{2} molecule is adequately described by the three-center four-electron bond model.

XeF_{2} can act as a ligand in coordination complexes of metals. For example, in HF solution:

Mg(AsF_{6})_{2} + 4 XeF_{2} → [Mg(XeF_{2})_{4}](AsF_{6})_{2}

Crystallographic analysis shows that the magnesium atom is coordinated to 6 fluorine atoms. Four of the fluorine atoms are attributed to the four xenon difluoride ligands while the other two are a pair of cis-AsF^{−}_{6} ligands.

A similar reaction is:

Mg(AsF_{6})_{2} + 2 XeF_{2} → [Mg(XeF_{2})_{2}](AsF_{6})_{2}

In the crystal structure of this product the magnesium atom is octahedrally-coordinated and the XeF_{2} ligands are axial while the AsF^{−}_{6} ligands are equatorial.

Many such reactions with products of the form [M^{x}(XeF_{2})_{n}](AF_{6})_{x} have been observed, where M can be calcium, strontium, barium, lead, silver, lanthanum, or neodymium and A can be arsenic, antimony or phosphorus. Some of these compounds feature extraordinarily high coordination numbers at the metal center.

In 2004, results of synthesis of a solvate where part of cationic centers were coordinated solely by XeF_{2} fluorine atoms were published. Reaction can be written as:

2 Ca(AsF_{6})_{2} + 9 XeF_{2} → Ca_{2}(XeF_{2})_{9}(AsF_{6})_{4}.

This reaction requires a large excess of xenon difluoride. The structure of the salt is such that half of the Ca^{2+} ions are coordinated by fluorine atoms from xenon difluoride, while the other Ca^{2+} ions are coordinated by both XeF_{2} and AsF^{−}_{6}.

== Applications ==
=== As a fluorinating agent ===
Xenon difluoride is a strong fluorinating and oxidizing agent. With fluoride ion acceptors, it forms XeF^{+} and Xe_{2}F^{+}_{3} species which are even more powerful fluorinators.

Among the fluorination reactions that xenon difluoride undergoes are:

- Oxidative fluorination:

Ph_{3}TeF + XeF_{2} → Ph_{3}TeF_{3} + Xe

- Reductive fluorination:

2 CrO_{2}F_{2} + XeF_{2} → 2 CrOF_{3} + Xe +O_{2}

- Aromatic fluorination:

- Alkene fluorination:

- Radical fluorination in radical decarboxylative fluorination reactions, in Hunsdiecker-type reactions where xenon difluoride is used to generate the radical intermediate as well as the fluorine transfer source, and in generating aryl radicals from aryl silanes:

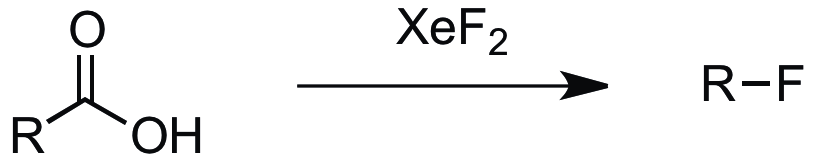

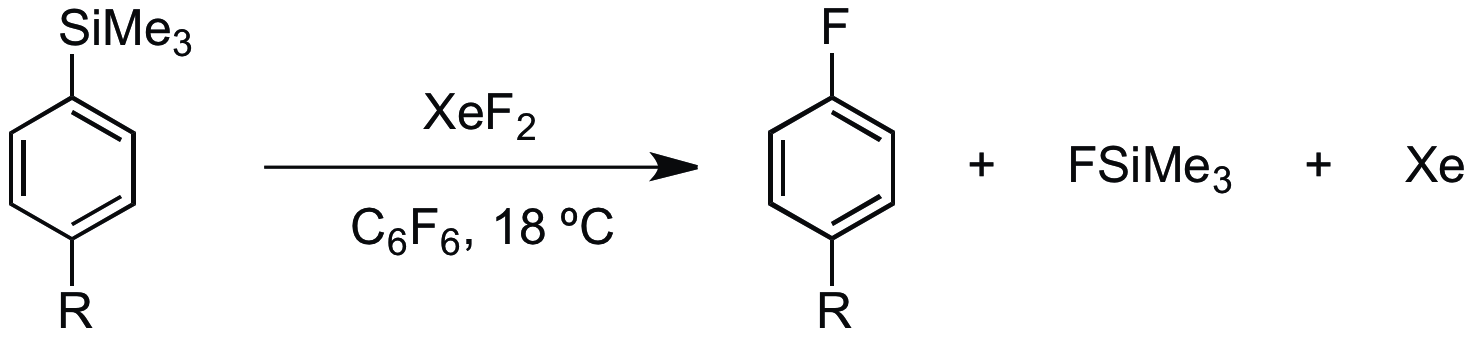

XeF_{2} is selective about which atom it fluorinates, making it a useful reagent for fluorinating heteroatoms without touching other substituents in organic compounds. For example, it fluorinates the arsenic atom in trimethylarsine, but leaves the methyl groups untouched:

(CH_{3})_{3}As + XeF_{2} → (CH_{3})_{3}AsF_{2} + Xe

XeF_{2} can similarly be used to prepare N-fluoroammonium salts, useful as fluorine transfer reagents in organic synthesis (e.g., Selectfluor), from the corresponding tertiary amine:

[R–(CH_{2}CH_{2})_{3}N:][BF^{−}_{4}] + XeF_{2} + NaBF_{4} → [R–(CH_{2}CH_{2})_{3}–F][BF^{−}_{4}]_{2} + NaF + Xe

XeF_{2} will also oxidatively decarboxylate carboxylic acids to the corresponding fluoroalkanes:

RCOOH + XeF_{2} → RF + CO_{2} + Xe + HF

Silicon tetrafluoride has been found to act as a catalyst in fluorination by XeF_{2}.

=== As an etchant ===
Xenon difluoride is also used as an isotropic gaseous etchant for silicon, particularly in the production of microelectromechanical systems (MEMS), as first demonstrated in 1995. Commercial systems use pulse etching with an expansion chamber Brazzle, Dokmeci, et al. describe this process:

The mechanism of the etch is as follows. First, the XeF_{2} adsorbs and dissociates to xenon and fluorine atoms on the surface of silicon. Fluorine is the main etchant in the silicon etching process. The reaction describing the silicon with XeF_{2} is

2 XeF_{2} + Si → 2 Xe + SiF_{4}

XeF_{2} has a relatively high etch rate and does not require ion bombardment or external energy sources in order to etch silicon.
