= Test Ban Treaty =

Three test ban treaties aimed at prohibiting most nuclear weapons testing have been adopted:

- The Partial Test Ban Treaty, adopted in 1963, signed by the Soviet Union, the United Kingdom, the United States, prohibited all testing except underground tests
- Threshold Test Ban Treaty, adopted in 1974 between the United States and Soviet Union limiting the yield of nuclear tests to 150 kilotons
- Comprehensive Nuclear-Test-Ban Treaty, adopted by the United Nations General Assembly in 1996 but not in force, by which states agree to ban all nuclear explosions in all environments

== See also ==
- Nuclear weapons testing § Treaties against testing
