= Xenon tetrafluoride =

Chemical compound

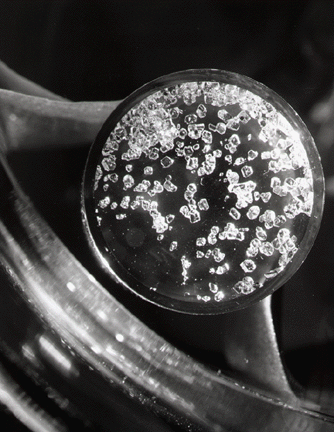
- XeF_{4} crystals. 1962.

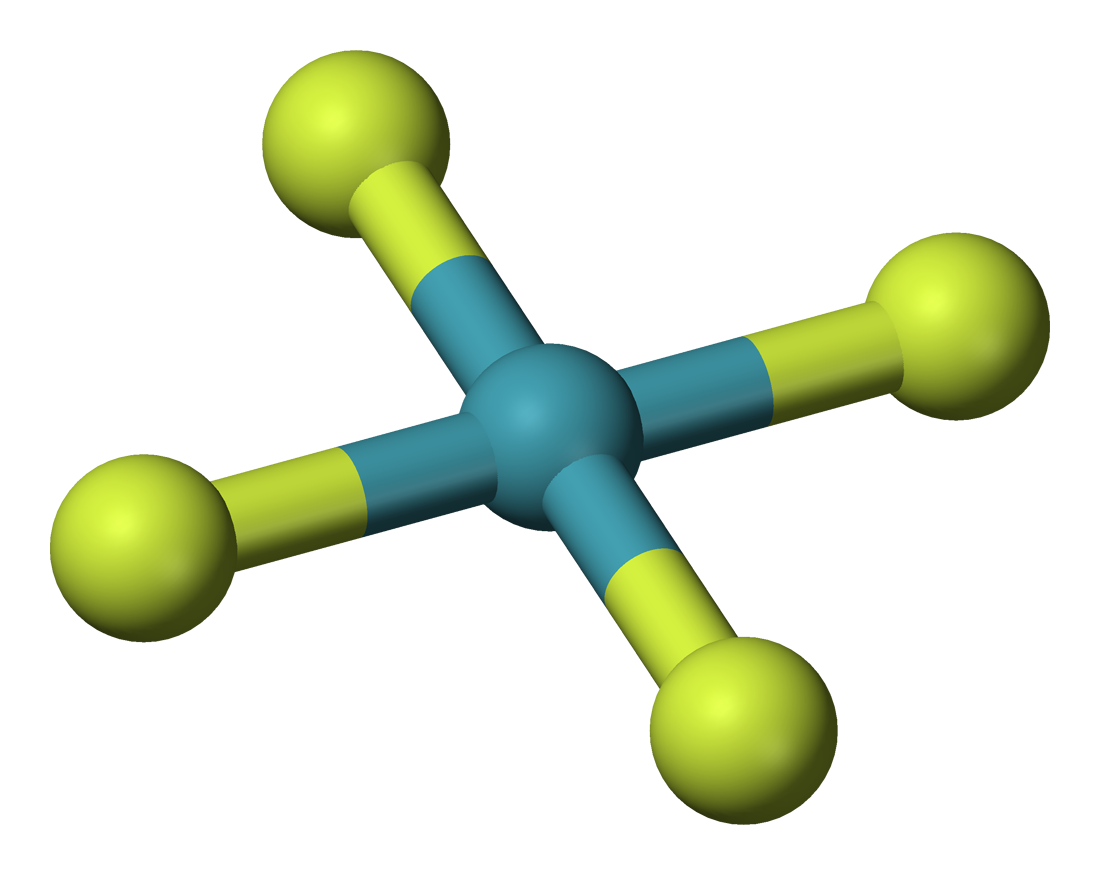

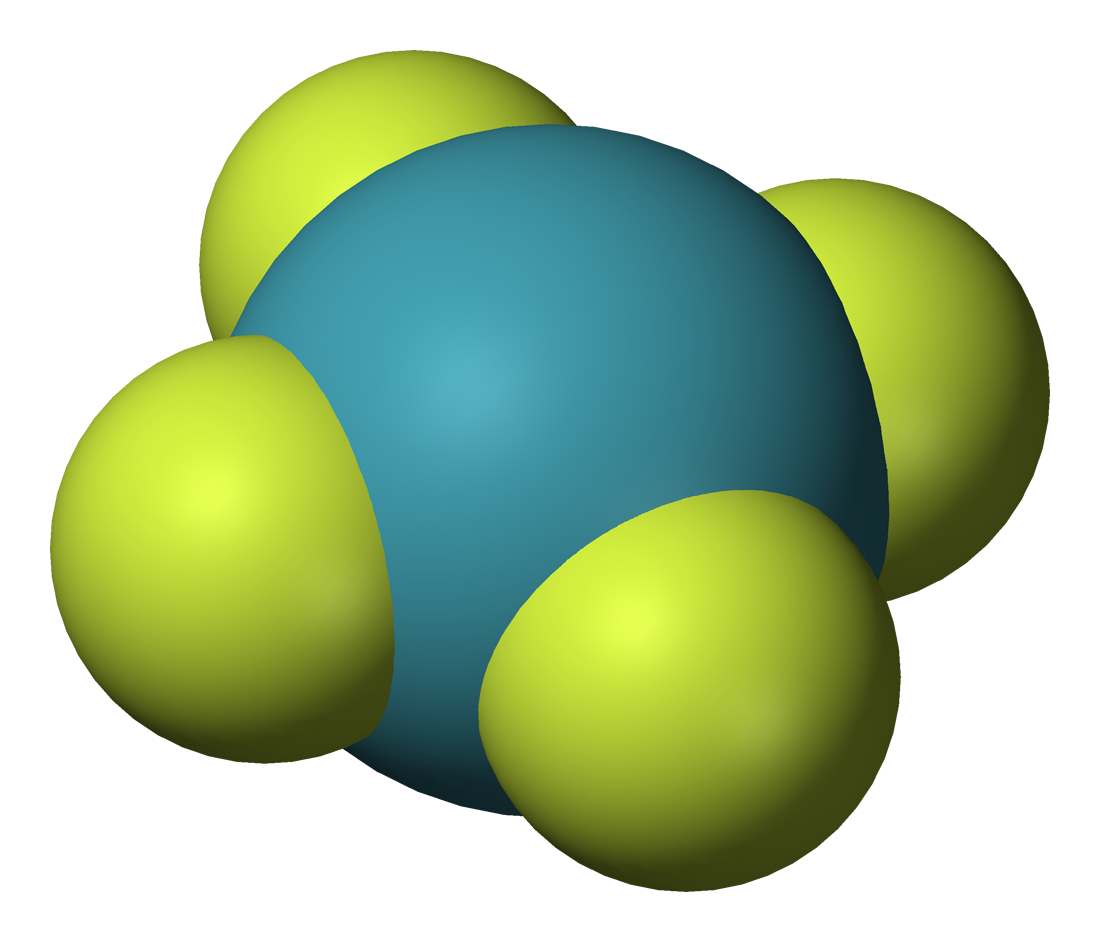

Names
- IUPAC name Xenon tetrafluoride

Identifiers
CAS Number	13709-61-0
3D model (JSmol)	Interactive image
ChemSpider	109927
ECHA InfoCard	100.033.858
PubChem CID	123324
UNII	O825AI8P4W
CompTox Dashboard (EPA)	DTXSID50160062
- InChI: InChI=1S/F4Xe/c1-5(2,3)4 Key: RPSSQXXJRBEGEE-UHFFFAOYSA-N; InChI=1/F4Xe/c1-5(2,3)4 Key: RPSSQXXJRBEGEE-UHFFFAOYAW
- SMILES: F[Xe](F)(F)F

Properties
Chemical formula	XeF_{4}
Molar mass	207.2836 g mol^{−1}
Appearance	White solid
Density	4.040 g cm^{−3}, solid
Melting point	117 °C (243 °F; 390 K) sublimes
Solubility in water	Reacts

Structure
Coordination geometry	D_{4h}
Molecular shape	square planar
Dipole moment	0 D

Thermochemistry
Std molar entropy (S^{⦵}_{298})	146 J·mol^{−1}·K^{−1}
Std enthalpy of formation (Δ_{f}H^{⦵}_{298})	−251 kJ·mol^{−1}
- Except where otherwise noted, data are given for materials in their standard state (at 25 °C [77 °F], 100 kPa). verify (what is ?) Infobox references

Xenon tetrafluoride is a chemical compound with chemical formula XeF_{4}. It was the first discovered binary compound of a noble gas. It is produced by the chemical reaction of xenon with fluorine:

Xe + 2 F_{2} → XeF_{4}

This reaction is exothermic, releasing an energy of 251 kJ/mol.

Its discovery in 1962 was inspired by the discovery earlier in the same year by Neil Bartlett of the first xenon compound, XePtF_{6}, which showed that it was possible for a xenon compound to exist.

Xenon tetrafluoride is a colorless crystalline solid that sublimes at 117 °C. Its structure was determined by both NMR spectroscopy and X-ray crystallography in 1963. The structure is square planar, as has been confirmed by neutron diffraction studies. According to VSEPR theory, in addition to four fluoride ligands, the xenon center has two lone pairs of electrons. These lone pairs are mutually trans.

== Synthesis ==
The original synthesis of xenon tetrafluoride occurred through direct 1:5-molar-ratio combination of the elements in a nickel (Monel) vessel at 400 °C. The nickel does not catalyze the reaction, but rather protects the container surfaces against fluoride corrosion. Controlling the process against impurities is difficult, as xenon difluoride (XeF_{2}), tetrafluoride, and hexafluoride (XeF_{6}) are all in chemical equilibrium, the difluoride favored at low temperatures and little fluorine and the hexafluoride favored at high temperatures and excess fluorine. Fractional sublimation (xenon tetrafluoride is particularly involatile) or other equilibria generally allow purification of the product mixture.

The elements combine more selectively when γ- or UV-irradiated in a nickel container or dissolved in anhydrous hydrogen fluoride with catalytic oxygen. That reaction is believed selective because dioxygen difluoride at standard conditions is too weak an oxidant to generate xenon(VI) species.

Alternatively, fluoroxenonium perfluorometallate salts pyrolyze to XeF_{4}.

== Reactions ==
Xenon tetrafluoride hydrolyzes at low temperatures to form elemental xenon, oxygen, hydrofluoric acid, and aqueous xenon trioxide:

$$\rm \ 6XeF_4 + 12H_2O \rightarrow 2XeO_3 + 4Xe\uparrow + 3O_2\uparrow + 24HF$$

It is used as a precursor for synthesis of all tetravalent Xe compounds. Reaction with tetramethylammonium fluoride gives tetramethylammonium pentafluoroxenate, which contains the pentagonal XeF^{−}_{5} anion. The XeF^{−}_{5} anion is also formed by reaction with cesium fluoride:

CsF + XeF_{4} → CsXeF_{5}

Reaction with bismuth pentafluoride (BiF_{5}) forms the XeF^{+}_{3} cation:

BiF_{5} + XeF_{4} → XeF_{3}BiF_{6}

The XeF^{+}_{3} cation in the salt XeF_{3}Sb_{2}F_{11} has been characterized by NMR spectroscopy.

At 400 °C, XeF_{4} reacts with xenon to form XeF_{2}:

XeF_{4} + Xe → 2 XeF_{2}

The reaction of xenon tetrafluoride with platinum yields platinum tetrafluoride and xenon:

XeF_{4} + Pt → PtF_{4} + Xe

== Applications ==
Xenon tetrafluoride has few applications. It has been shown to degrade silicone rubber for analyzing trace metal impurities in the rubber. XeF_{4} reacts with the silicone to form simple gaseous products, leaving a residue of metal impurities.
