= Xenon dichloride =

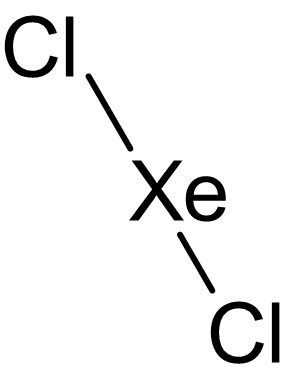

Names
- IUPAC name Dichloroxenon

Identifiers
| CAS Number | 13780-38-6 |
| 3D model (JSmol) | Interactive image |
| ChemSpider | 103871398 |
| PubChem CID | 60210033 |
- InChI: InChI=1S/Cl2Xe/c1-3-2 Key: ZDICFBIJLKDJAQ-UHFFFAOYSA-N
- SMILES: Cl[Xe]Cl

Properties
| Chemical formula | XeCl_{2} |
| Molar mass | 202.199 g/mol |
- Except where otherwise noted, data are given for materials in their standard state (at 25 °C [77 °F], 100 kPa). Infobox references

Xenon dichloride (XeCl_{2}) is a xenon compound and the only known stable chloride of xenon. The compound can be prepared by using microwave discharges towards the mixture of xenon and chlorine, and it can be isolated from a condensate trap. One experiment tried to use xenon, chlorine and boron trichloride to produce XeCl_{2}·BCl_{3}, but only generated xenon dichloride.

Experiments show conflict between two possible structures of this compound: a true linear molecule valence-isoelectronic to xenon difluoride, and a Van der Waals molecule isomers composed of a xenon atom and a chlorine molecule connected by a secondary bond, where the Cl_{2} molecule is oriented perpendicular to the secondary bond, forming an isosceles triangle. There is also predicted to be a second van der Waals isomer with the Cl_{2} oriented along the axis of the secondary bond, which would appear as an intermediate between the other two isomers if they coexist in the gas phase.
