= Noble gas compound =

Chemical compound containing a noble gas element

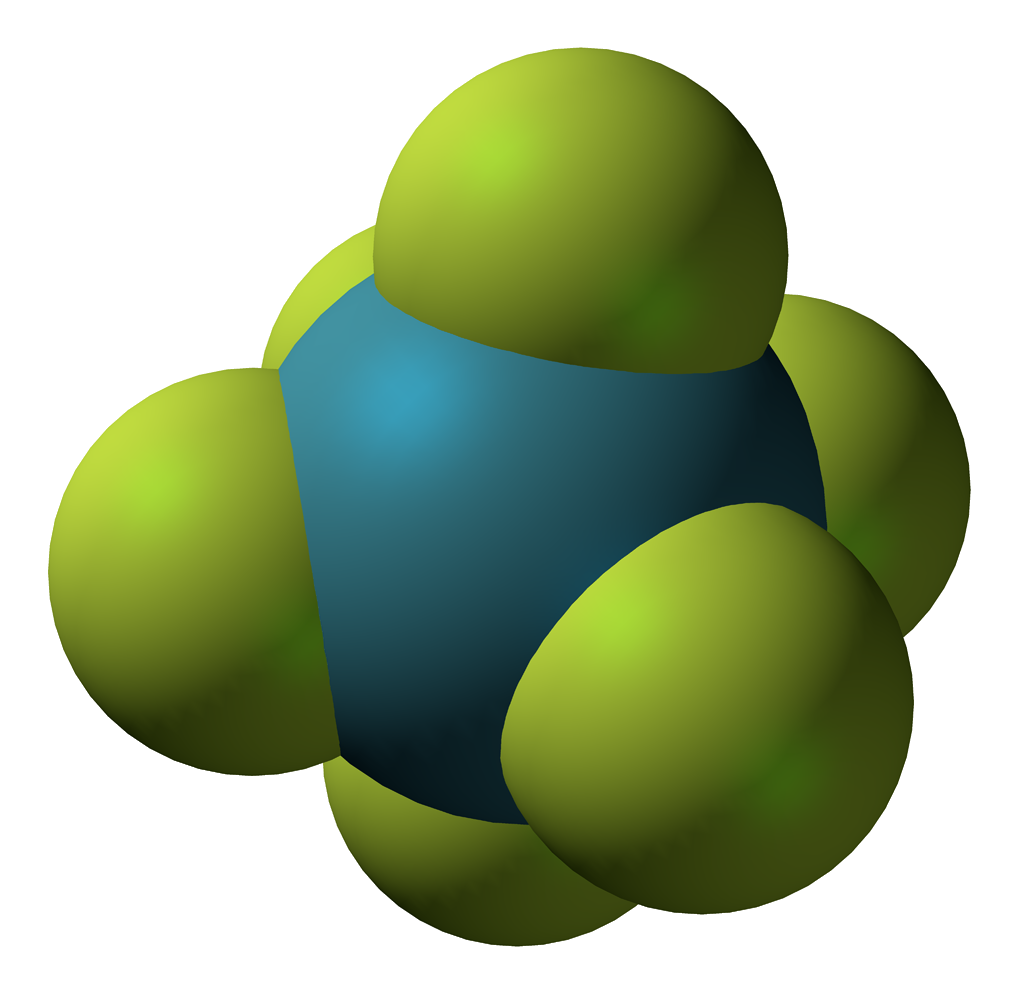
Xenon hexafluoride is an example of a noble gas compound

In chemistry, noble gas compounds are chemical compounds that include an element from the noble gases, group 8 or 18 of the periodic table. Although the noble gases are generally unreactive elements, many such compounds have been observed, particularly involving the element xenon.

From the standpoint of chemistry, the noble gases may be divided into two groups: the relatively reactive krypton (ionisation energy 14.0 eV, 1351 kJ mol^{-1}), xenon (12.1 eV, 1167 kJ mol^{-1}), and radon (10.7 eV, 1032 kJ mol^{-1}) on one side, and the very unreactive argon (15.8 eV, 1524 kJ mol^{-1}), neon (21.6 eV, 2084 kJ mol^{-1}), and helium (24.6 eV, 2374 kJ mol^{-1}) on the other. Consistent with this classification, Kr, Xe, and Rn form compounds that can be isolated in bulk at or near standard temperature and pressure, whereas He, Ne, Ar have been observed to form true chemical bonds using spectroscopic techniques, but only when frozen into a noble gas matrix at temperatures of 40 K (−233 °C; −388 °F) or lower, in supersonic jets of noble gas, or under extremely high pressures with metals.

The heavier noble gases have more electron shells than the lighter ones. Hence, the outermost electrons are subject to a shielding effect from the inner electrons that makes them more easily ionized, since they are less strongly attracted to the positively-charged nucleus. This results in an ionization energy low enough to form stable compounds with the most electronegative elements, fluorine and oxygen, and even with less electronegative elements such as nitrogen and carbon under certain circumstances.

== History and background ==
When the family of noble gases was first identified at the end of the nineteenth century, none of them were observed to form any compounds and so it was initially believed that they were all inert gases (as they were then called) which could not form compounds. With the development of atomic theory in the early twentieth century, their inertness was ascribed to a full valence shell of electrons which render them very chemically stable and nonreactive. All noble gases have full s and p outer electron shells (except helium, which has no p sublevel), and so do not form chemical compounds easily. Their high ionization energy and negative electron affinity explain their non-reactivity.

Immediately after the discovery of noble gases, chemists attempted to produce their compounds. The early attempts were failures. Moissan tried to react helium and fluorine at room temperature with electric spark. Berthelot announced a compound of helium with benzene and carbon disulfide using electric discharge. Boomer announced WHe_{2} formed under intense electric discharge from a tungsten filament in low-pressure helium. Morrison thought that helium, if irradiated so that one electron is pushed to a higher orbit, would behave similar to hydrogen. Consequently, he predicted that radioactive elements might form helides, and claimed to succeed in forming a compound of helium with lead-214, and a compound of helium with bismuth-214. See for an extensive listing of failed attempts before Bartlett's 1962 success. See Helium_compounds#Discredited_or_unlikely_observations for a list of false discoveries of helium compounds.

Walther Kossel in 1916 predicted theoretically, on the basis of ionization energy, that xenon fluoride and krypton fluoride can be made. Partly based on Kossel, Andreas von Antropoff argued in 1924 theoretically that the noble gases should be placed in group 8b, rather than group 18, and thus potentially reactive. Until 1933, he also attempted to experimentally produce noble gas compounds, unsuccessfully.

In 1933, Linus Pauling predicted that the heavier noble gases would be able to form compounds with fluorine and oxygen. Specifically, he predicted the existence of krypton hexafluoride (KrF_{6}) and xenon hexafluoride (XeF_{6}), speculated that XeF_{8} might exist as an unstable compound, and suggested that xenic acid would form perxenate salts. Quantum-chemical calculations subsequently supported Pauling's speculation, suggesting that bonding in a (then-hypothetical) noble gas compound would resemble bonding in the well-known trihalogenide ions, although these were ignored by the broader chemistry community. Pauling later retracted his hypothesis, claming in 1961 that "Xenon is completely unreactive chemically". On Pauling's suggestion, Yost and Kaye in 1933 attempted and failed to make xenon react with fluorine, though Rudolf Hoppe in 1962 would use a modified version of their approach to make XeF_{2} for the first time.

In June 1962, Neil Bartlett gave the first creditable report of a noble gas compound. Bartlett had noticed that the highly oxidising compound platinum hexafluoride ionised O_{2} to O_{2}^{+}. As the ionisation energy of O_{2} to O_{2}^{+} (1165 kJ mol^{−1}) is nearly equal to the ionisation energy of Xe to Xe^{+} (1170 kJ mol^{−1}), he tried the reaction of Xe with PtF_{6}. This yielded a crystalline product, xenon hexafluoroplatinate, whose formula was proposed to be Xe^{+}[PtF_{6}]^{−}. It was later shown that the compound is actually more complex, containing both [XeF]^{+}[PtF_{5}]^{−} and [XeF]^{+}[Pt_{2}F_{11}]^{−}. Nonetheless, this was the first real compound of any noble gas.

The psychological barrier broken, the first binary noble gas compounds appeared later that year. Bartlett subjected a mixture of xenon and fluorine to high temperature, obtaining xenon tetrafluoride (XeF_{4}). Meanwhile, Rudolf Hoppe, among other groups, synthesized xenon difluoride (XeF_{2}) from the elements. Pauling et al's predictions thus proved quite accurate, although XeF_{8} appears not only thermodynamically, but kinetically unstable. As of 2022, XeF_{8} has not been made, and only the octafluoroxenate(VI) anion ([XeF_{8}]^{2−}) observed.

Following the first successful synthesis of xenon compounds, synthesis of krypton difluoride (KrF_{2}) was reported in 1963.

== True noble gas compounds ==
In this section, the non-radioactive noble gases are considered in decreasing order of atomic weight, which generally reflects the priority of their discovery, and the breadth of available information for these compounds. The radioactive elements radon and oganesson are harder to study and are considered at the end of the section.

=== Xenon compounds ===
After the initial 1962 studies on XeF_{4} and XeF_{2}, xenon compounds that have been synthesized include other fluorides (XeF_{6}), oxyfluorides (XeOF_{2}, XeOF_{4}, XeO_{2}F_{2}, XeO_{3}F_{2}, XeO_{2}F_{4}) and oxides (XeO_{2}, XeO_{3} and XeO_{4}). Xenon fluorides react with several other fluorides to form fluoroxenates, such as sodium octafluoroxenate(VI) ((Na^{+})_{2}[XeF_{8}]^{2−}), and fluoroxenonium salts, such as trifluoroxenonium hexafluoroantimonate ([XeF_{3}]^{+}[SbF_{6}]^{−}).

In terms of other halide reactivity, short-lived excimers of noble gas halides such as XeCl_{2} or XeCl are prepared in situ, and are used in the function of excimer lasers.

Recently, xenon has been shown to produce a wide variety of compounds of the type XeO_{n}X_{2} where n is 1, 2 or 3 and X is any electronegative group, such as CF_{3}, C(SO_{2}CF_{3})_{3}, N(SO_{2}F)_{2}, N(SO_{2}CF_{3})_{2}, OTeF_{5}, O(IO_{2}F_{2}), etc.; the range of compounds is impressive, similar to that seen with the neighbouring element iodine, running into the thousands and involving bonds between xenon and oxygen, nitrogen, carbon, boron and even gold, as well as perxenic acid, several halides, and complex ions.

The compound [Xe_{2}]^{+}[Sb_{4}F_{21}]^{−} contains a Xe–Xe bond, which is the longest element-element bond known (308.71 pm = 3.0871 Å). Short-lived excimers of Xe_{2} are reported to exist as a part of the function of excimer lasers.

=== Krypton compounds ===
Krypton gas reacts with fluorine gas under extreme forcing conditions, forming KrF_{2} according to the following equation:

Kr + F_{2} → KrF_{2}

KrF_{2} reacts with strong Lewis acids to form salts of the [KrF]^{+} and [Kr_{2}F_{3}]^{+} cations. The preparation of KrF_{4} reported by Grosse in 1963, using the Claasen method, was subsequently shown to be a mistaken identification.

Krypton compounds with other than Kr–F bonds (compounds with atoms other than fluorine) have also been described. KrF_{2} reacts with B(OTeF_{5})_{3} to produce the unstable compound, Kr(OTeF_{5})_{2}, with a krypton-oxygen bond. A krypton-nitrogen bond is found in the cation [H−C≡N−Kr−F]^{+}, produced by the reaction of KrF_{2} with [H−C≡N−H]^{+}[AsF_{6}]^{−} below −50 °C.

=== Argon compounds ===
Reported in 1970, neutral argon monohydride (ArH) was the first discovered hydride of a noble gas. It is unstable in its ground state, but can form stable Rydberg molecules. The argon hydride ion [ArH]^{+} (argonium) was obtained in the 1970s. This molecular ion has also been identified in the Crab Nebula, based on the frequency of its light emissions.

The discovery of HArF was announced in 2000. The compound can exist in low temperature argon matrices for experimental studies, and it has also been studied computationally. Hexafluoroantimonate [SbF_{6}]^{−} and hexafluoroaurate [AuF_{6}]^{−} salts of [ArF]^{+} have been predicted but not yet isolated.

Various argon-nitrogen cations have been detected, such as [ArNH]^{+}, [ArN_{2}]^{+}, [ArHN_{2}]^{+}, [Ar(N_{2})_{2}]^{+}, and [ArN_{2}O]^{+}. These are often linear species (e.g. [ArHN_{2}]^{+} is Ar−H−N−N and [Ar(N_{2})_{2}]^{+} is N=N−Ar^{+}−N=N).

Argon-beryllium compounds have been reported, such as ArBeO (from reaction of beryllium atoms with oxygen in a solid argon matrix) and ArBeS (from reaction of beryllium with hydrogen sulfide trapped in an argon matrix at 4 K).

=== Neon and helium compounds ===
The ions Ne^{+}, [NeAr]^{+}, [NeH]^{+}, and [HeNe]^{+} are known from optical and mass spectrometric studies. There is some empirical and theoretical evidence for a few metastable helium compounds which may exist at very low temperatures or extreme pressures. The stable cation [HeH]^{+} was reported in 1925, but was not considered a true compound since it is not neutral and cannot be isolated. The first helium compound created was disodium helide (Na_{2}He), created in 2016. The compound does not have true bonds between the helium and sodium atoms, but instead the helium atoms stabilize the solid lattice.

=== Radon and oganesson compounds ===
Radon is not chemically inert, but its short half-life (3.8 days for ^{222}Rn) and the high energy of its radioactivity make it difficult to investigate its chemistry. There are very few reported compounds of radon, all being either fluorides or oxides.

The radon compounds known are one fluoride (RnF_{2}), one oxide (RnO_{3}), and their reaction products.

All known oganesson isotopes have even shorter half-lives in the millisecond range and no compounds are known yet, although some have been predicted theoretically. It is expected to be even more reactive than radon, more like a normal element than a noble gas in its chemistry.

== Reports prior to xenon hexafluoroplatinate and xenon tetrafluoride ==
=== Clathrates ===
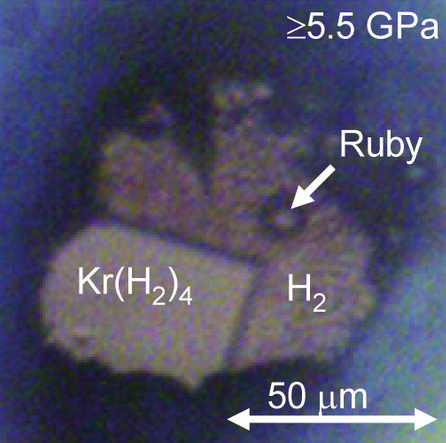
Kr(H_{2})_{4} and H_{2} solids formed in a diamond anvil cell. Ruby was added for pressure measurement.

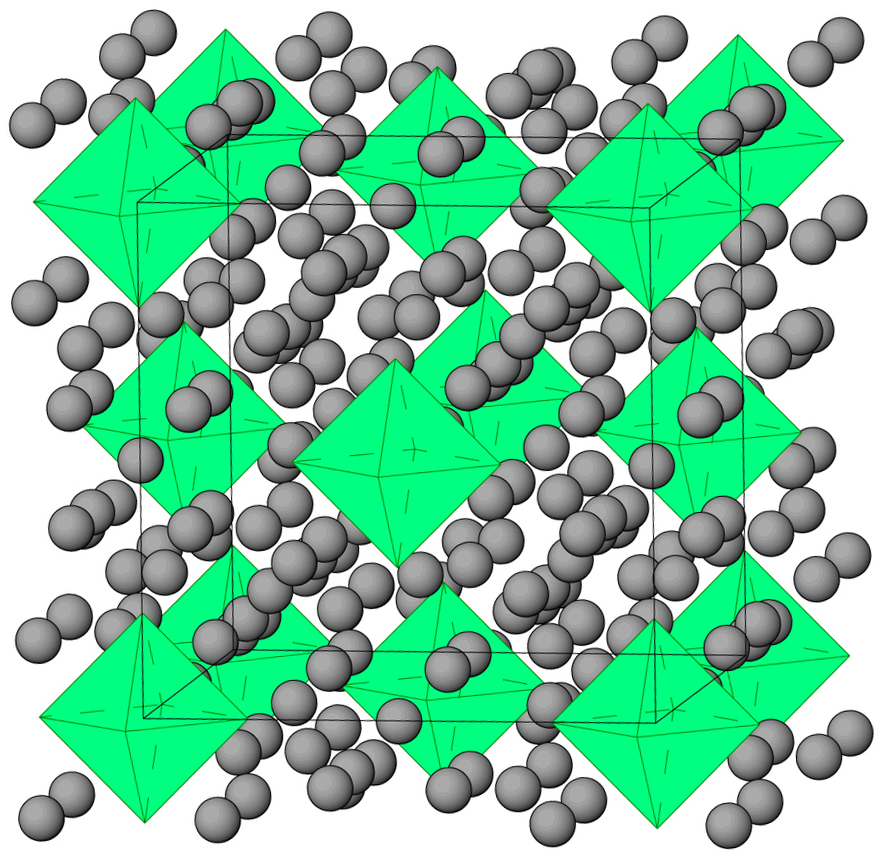
Structure of Kr(H_{2})_{4}. Krypton octahedra (green) are surrounded by randomly oriented hydrogen molecules.

Prior to 1962, the only isolated compounds of noble gases were clathrates (including clathrate hydrates); other compounds such as coordination compounds were observed only by spectroscopic means. Clathrates (also known as cage compounds) are compounds of noble gases in which they are trapped within cavities of crystal lattices of certain organic and inorganic substances.

The clathrate hydrates of argon hydrates were made in 1896, a few years after their discovery. The clathrate hydrates of krypton, xenon, radon followed. Helium clathrates were made in 1988. Neon clathrates were made in 1999.

Ar, Kr, Xe and Ne can form clathrates with crystalline hydroquinone. Kr and Xe can appear as guests in crystals of melanophlogite. Neon forms a clathrate hydrate stable at high pressure and low temperature.

Helium-nitrogen (He(N_{2})_{11}) crystals have been grown at room temperature at pressures ca. 10 GPa in a diamond anvil cell. Solid argon-hydrogen clathrate (Ar(H_{2})_{2}) has the same crystal structure as the MgZn_{2} Laves phase. It forms at pressures between 4.3 and 220 GPa, though Raman measurements suggest that the H_{2} molecules in Ar(H_{2})_{2} dissociate above 175 GPa. A similar Kr(H_{2})_{4} solid forms at pressures above 5 GPa. It has a face-centered cubic structure where krypton octahedra are surrounded by randomly oriented hydrogen molecules. Meanwhile, in solid Xe(H_{2})_{8} xenon atoms form dimers inside solid hydrogen.

=== Coordination compounds ===
Coordination compounds such as Ar·BF_{3} have been postulated to exist at low temperatures, but have never been confirmed.

Xenon is known to function as a metal ligand. In addition to the charged [AuXe_{4}]^{2+}, xenon, krypton, and argon all reversibly bind to gaseous M(CO)_{5}, where M=Cr, Mo, or W. P-block metals also bind noble gases: XeBeO has been observed spectroscopically and both XeBeS and FXeBO are predicted stable.

Also, compounds such as WHe_{2} and HgHe_{2} were reported to have been formed by electron bombardment, but recent research has shown that these are probably the result of He being adsorbed on the surface of the metal; therefore, these compounds cannot truly be considered chemical compounds.

=== Hydrates ===
Hydrates are formed by compressing noble gases in water, where it is believed that the water molecule, a strong dipole, induces a weak dipole in the noble gas atoms, resulting in dipole-dipole interaction. Heavier atoms are more influenced than smaller ones, hence Xe·5.75H_{2}O was reported to have been the most stable hydrate; it has a melting point of 24 °C. The deuterated version of this hydrate has also been produced.

== Fullerene adducts ==
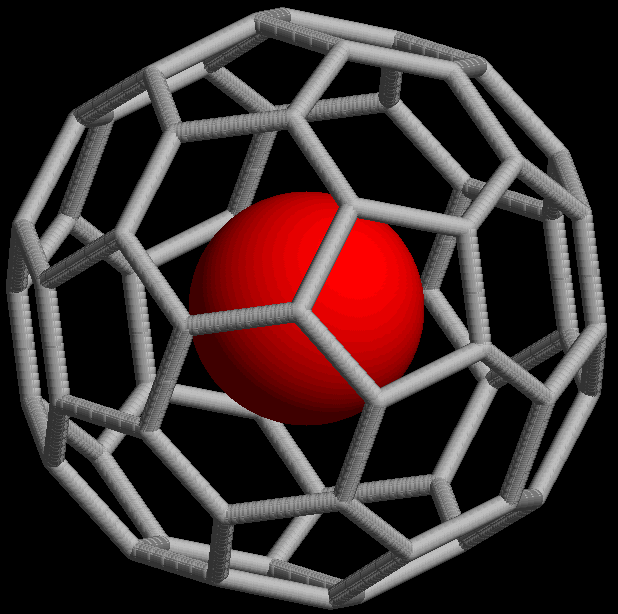
Structure of a noble-gas atom caged within a buckminsterfullerene (C_{60}) molecule.

Noble gases can also form endohedral fullerene compounds where the noble gas atom is trapped inside a fullerene molecule. In 1993, it was discovered that when C_{60} is exposed to a pressure of around 3 bar of He or Ne, the complexes He@C_{60} and Ne@C_{60} are formed. Under these conditions, only about one out of every 650,000 C_{60} cages was doped with a helium atom; with higher pressures (3000 bar), it is possible to achieve a yield of up to 0.1%. Endohedral complexes with argon, krypton and xenon have also been obtained, as well as numerous adducts of He@C_{60}.

== Applications ==
Most applications of noble gas compounds are either as oxidising agents or as a means to store noble gases in a dense form. Xenic acid is a valuable oxidising agent because it has no potential for introducing impurities—xenon is simply liberated as a gas—and so is rivalled only by ozone in this regard. The perxenates are even more powerful oxidizing agents. Xenon-based oxidants have also been used for synthesizing carbocations stable at room temperature, in SO_{2}ClF solution.

Stable salts of xenon containing very high proportions of fluorine by weight (such as tetrafluoroammonium heptafluoroxenate(VI), [NF_{4}][XeF_{7}], and the related tetrafluoroammonium octafluoroxenate(VI) [NF_{4}]_{2}[XeF_{8}]), have been developed as highly energetic oxidisers for use as propellants in rocketry.

Xenon fluorides are good fluorinating agents.

Clathrates have been used for separation of He and Ne from Ar, Kr, and Xe, and also for the transportation of Ar, Kr, and Xe. (For instance, radioactive isotopes of krypton and xenon are difficult to store and dispose, and compounds of these elements may be more easily handled than the gaseous forms.) In addition, clathrates of radioisotopes may provide suitable formulations for experiments requiring sources of particular types of radiation; hence ^{85}Kr clathrate provides a safe source of beta particles, while ^{133}Xe clathrate provides a useful source of gamma rays.

== Resources ==
- Khriachtchev, Leonid; Räsänen, Markku; Gerber, R. Benny (2009). "Noble-Gas Hydrides: New Chemistry at Low Temperatures". Accounts of Chemical Research. 42 (1): 183–91. doi:10.1021/ar800110q. PMID 18720951.
