= Noble gas =

Group of low-reactive, gaseous chemical elements

Noble gases
Hydrogen																															Helium
Lithium	Beryllium																									Boron	Carbon	Nitrogen	Oxygen	Fluorine	Neon
Sodium	Magnesium																									Aluminium	Silicon	Phosphorus	Sulfur	Chlorine	Argon
Potassium	Calcium															Scandium	Titanium	Vanadium	Chromium	Manganese	Iron	Cobalt	Nickel	Copper	Zinc	Gallium	Germanium	Arsenic	Selenium	Bromine	Krypton
Rubidium	Strontium															Yttrium	Zirconium	Niobium	Molybdenum	Technetium	Ruthenium	Rhodium	Palladium	Silver	Cadmium	Indium	Tin	Antimony	Tellurium	Iodine	Xenon
Caesium	Barium	Lanthanum	Cerium	Praseodymium	Neodymium	Promethium	Samarium	Europium	Gadolinium	Terbium	Dysprosium	Holmium	Erbium	Thulium	Ytterbium	Lutetium	Hafnium	Tantalum	Tungsten	Rhenium	Osmium	Iridium	Platinum	Gold	Mercury (element)	Thallium	Lead	Bismuth	Polonium	Astatine	Radon
Francium	Radium	Actinium	Thorium	Protactinium	Uranium	Neptunium	Plutonium	Americium	Curium	Berkelium	Californium	Einsteinium	Fermium	Mendelevium	Nobelium	Lawrencium	Rutherfordium	Dubnium	Seaborgium	Bohrium	Hassium	Meitnerium	Darmstadtium	Roentgenium	Copernicium	Nihonium	Flerovium	Moscovium	Livermorium	Tennessine	Oganesson
halogens ← → alkali metals
IUPAC group number	18
Name by element	helium group or neon group
Trivial name	noble gases
CAS group number (US, pattern A-B-A)	VIIIA
old IUPAC number (Europe, pattern A-B)	0

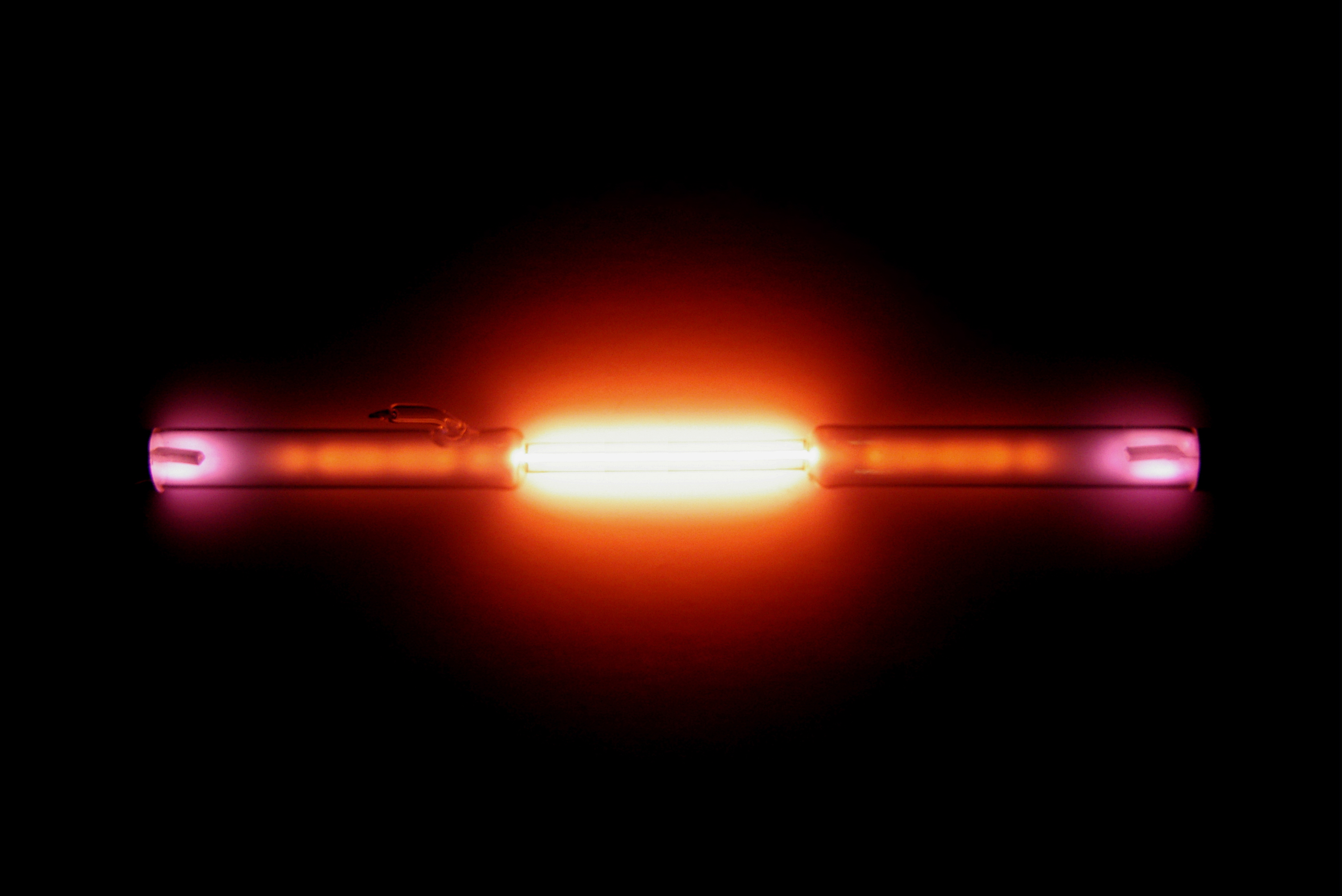
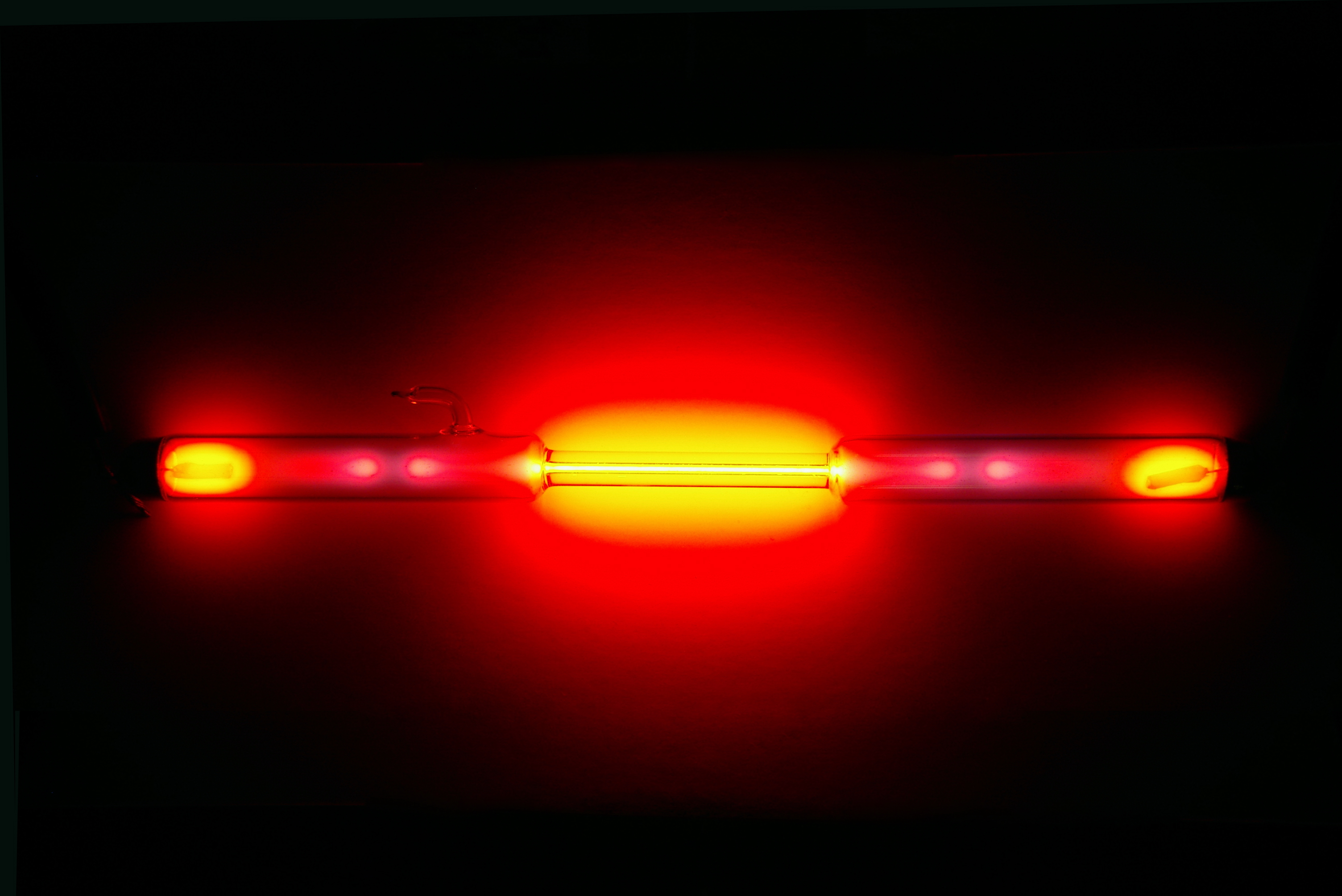
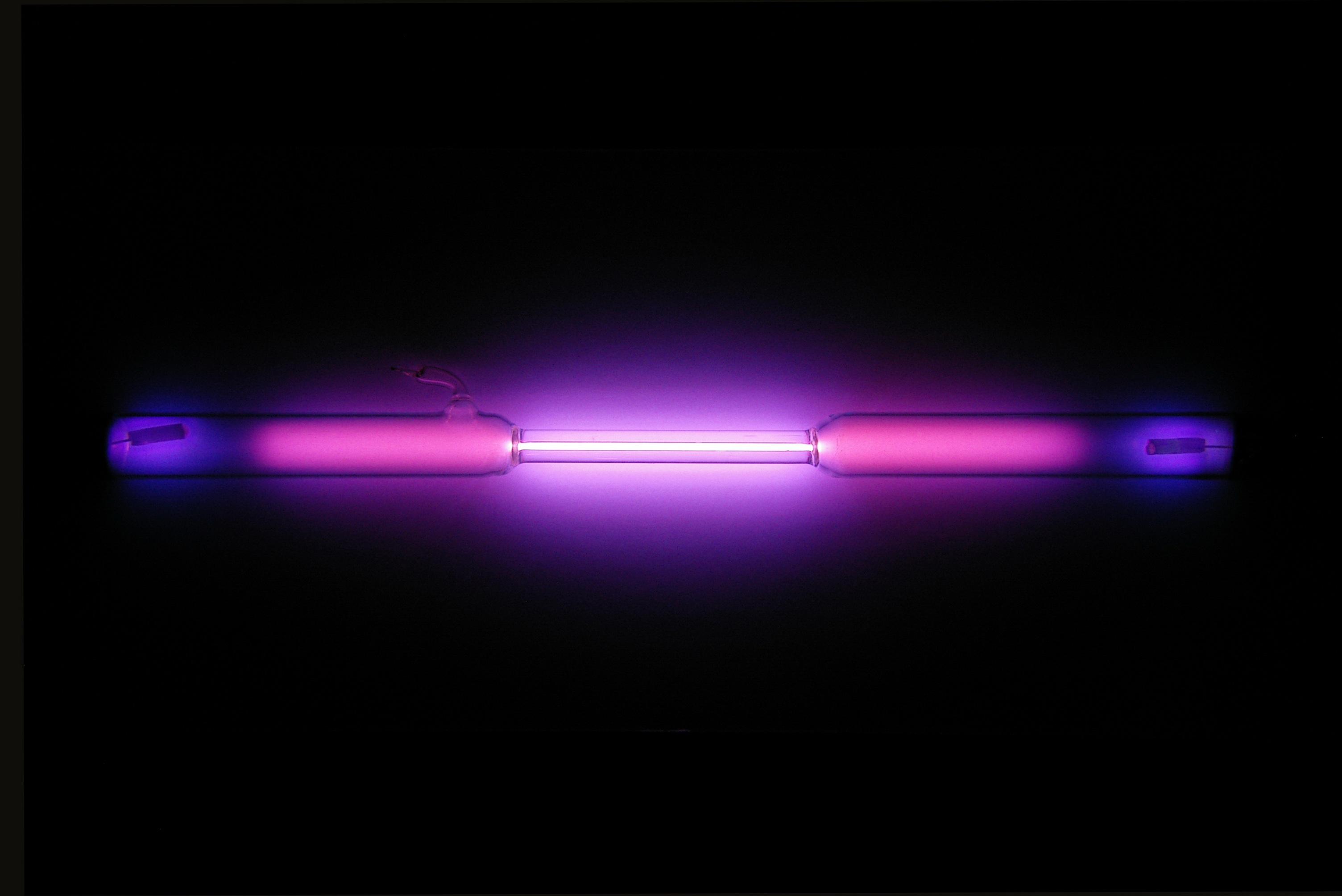
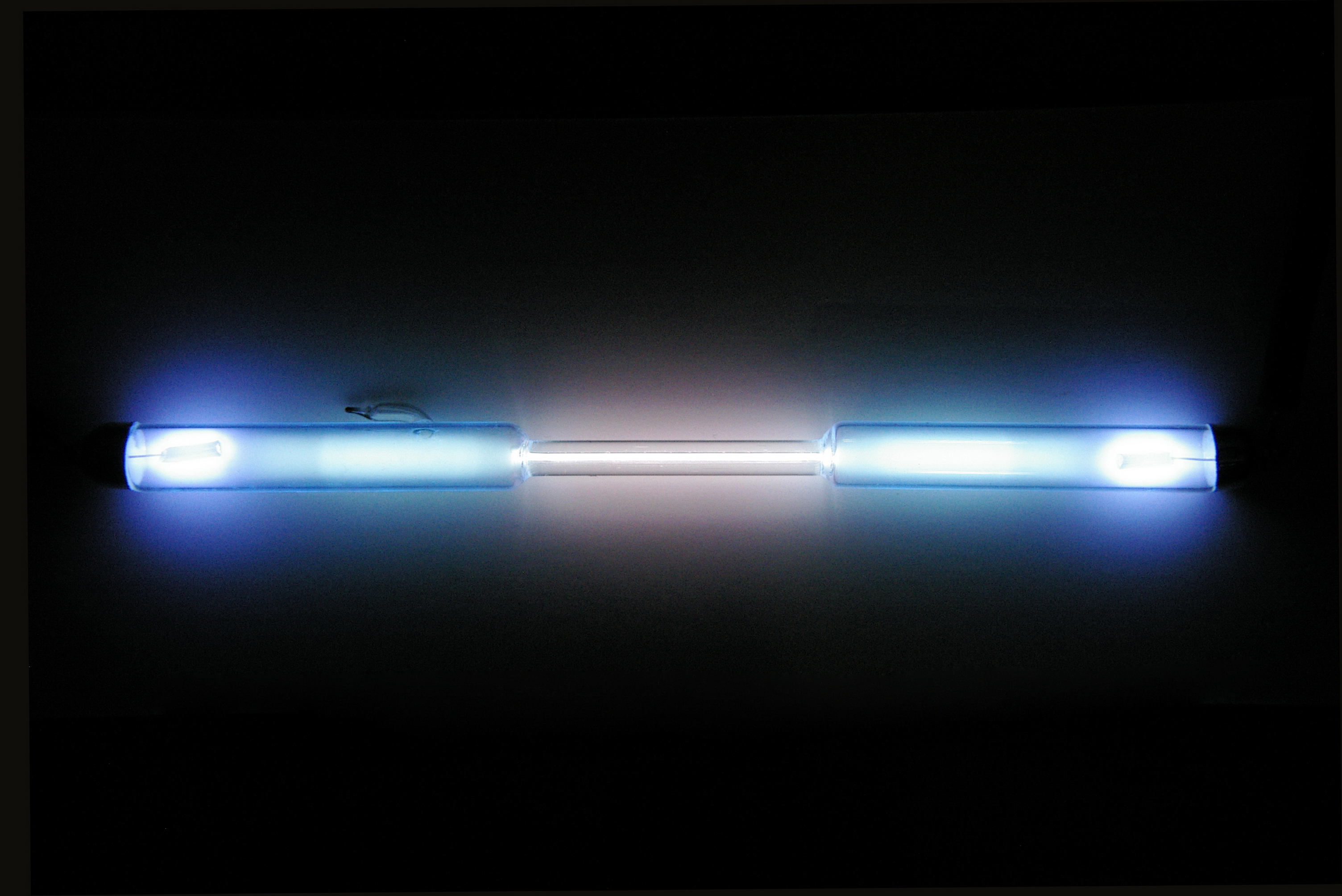
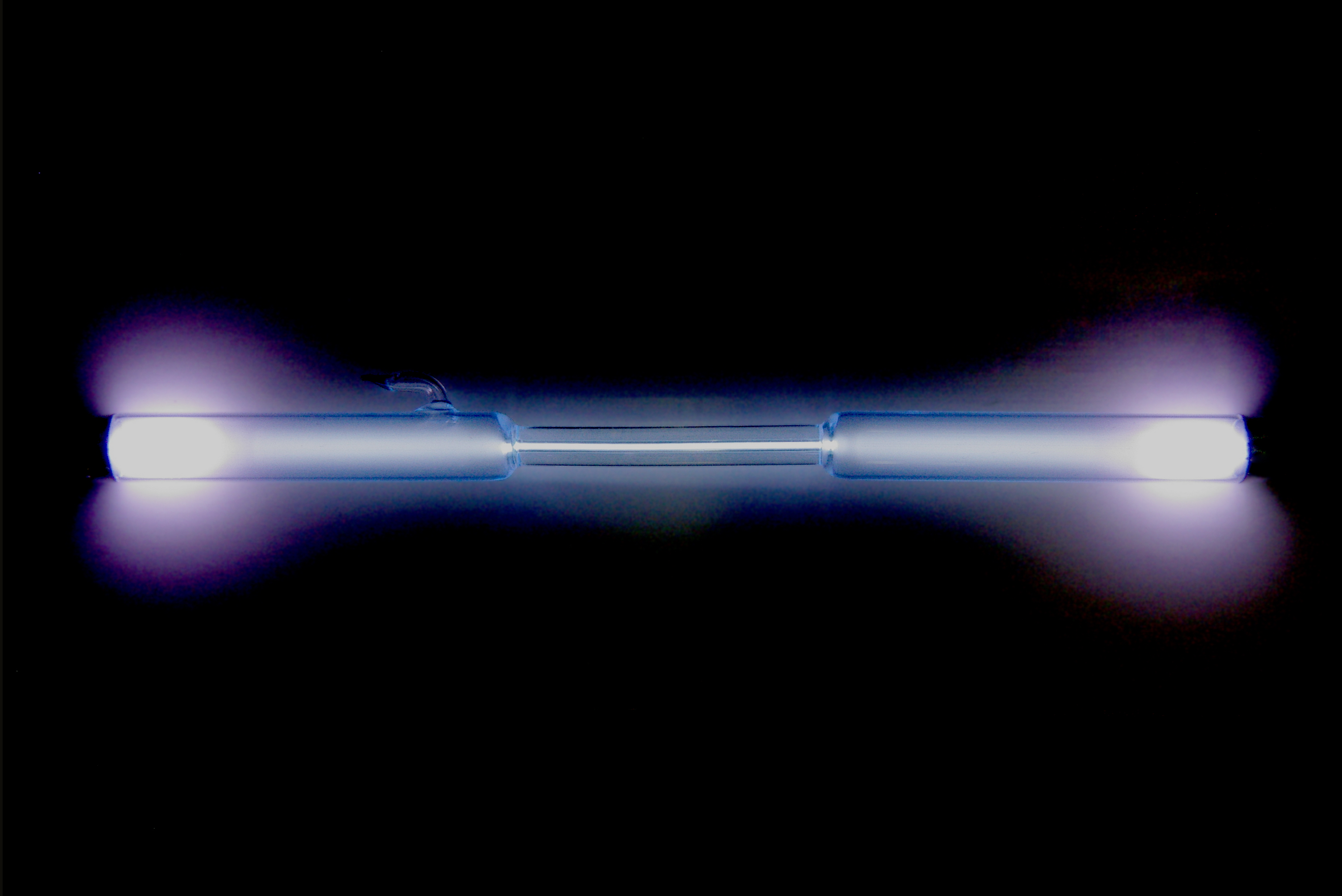
↓ Period
2	Helium (He); 2 Noble gas
10	Neon (Ne); 10 Noble gas
18	Argon (Ar); 18 Noble gas
36	Krypton (Kr); 36 Noble gas
54	Xenon (Xe); 54 Noble gas
86	Radon (Rn); 86 Noble gas
118	Oganesson (Og); 118 Noble gas
Legend primordial element element from decay Synthetic

The noble gases (historically the inert gases, sometimes referred to as aerogens) are the members of group 18 of the periodic table: helium (He), neon (Ne), argon (Ar), krypton (Kr), xenon (Xe), radon (Rn) and, in some cases, oganesson (Og). Under standard conditions, the first six of these elements are odorless, colorless, monatomic gases with very low chemical reactivity and cryogenic boiling points. The properties of oganesson are uncertain.

The intermolecular force between noble gas atoms is the very weak London dispersion force, so their boiling points are all cryogenic, below 165 K (−108 °C; −163 °F).

The noble gases' inertness, or tendency not to react with other chemical substances, results from their electron configuration: their outer shell of valence electrons is "full", giving them little tendency to participate in chemical reactions. Only a few hundred noble gas compounds are known to exist. The inertness of noble gases makes them useful whenever chemical reactions are unwanted. For example, argon is used as a shielding gas in welding and as a filler gas in incandescent light bulbs. Helium is used to provide buoyancy in blimps and balloons. Helium and neon are also used as refrigerants due to their low boiling points. Industrial quantities of the noble gases, except for radon, are obtained by separating them from air using the methods of liquefaction of gases and fractional distillation. Helium is also a byproduct of the mining of natural gas. Radon is usually isolated from the radioactive decay of dissolved radium, thorium, or uranium compounds.

The seventh member of group 18 is oganesson, an unstable synthetic element whose chemistry is still uncertain because only five very short-lived atoms (t_{1/2} = 0.69 ms) have ever been synthesized (as of 2020). IUPAC uses the term "noble gas" interchangeably with "group 18" and thus includes oganesson; however, due to relativistic effects, oganesson is predicted to be a solid under standard conditions and reactive enough not to qualify functionally as "noble".

Various older periodic table layouts have identified this column as group 0 or group 8 (sometimes as group VIIIA or group VIIIB), but the formal IUPAC recommendation has been group 18 since 1988.

== History ==
Noble gas is translated from the German noun Edelgas, first used in 1900 by Hugo Erdmann to indicate their extremely low level of reactivity. The name makes an analogy to the term "noble metals", which also have low reactivity. The noble gases have also been referred to as inert gases, but this label is deprecated as many noble gas compounds are now known. Rare gases is another term that was used, but this is also inaccurate because argon forms a fairly considerable part (0.94% by volume, 1.3% by mass) of the Earth's atmosphere due to decay of radioactive potassium-40.

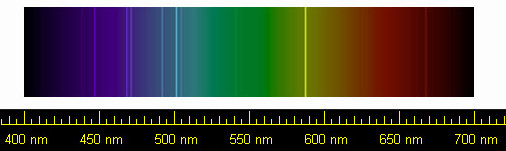
Sharp spectral lines characteristic of helium. Such lines were discovered in solar spectra before helium was discovered on Earth.

Pierre Janssen and Joseph Norman Lockyer had discovered a new element on 18 August 1868 while looking at the chromosphere of the Sun, and named it helium after the Greek word for the Sun, ἥλιος (hḗlios). No chemical analysis was possible at the time, but helium was later found to be a noble gas. Before them, in 1784, the English chemist and physicist Henry Cavendish had discovered that air contains a small proportion of a substance less reactive than nitrogen. A century later, in 1895, Lord Rayleigh discovered that samples of nitrogen from the air were of a different density than nitrogen resulting from chemical reactions. Along with Scottish scientist William Ramsay at University College, London, Lord Rayleigh theorized that the nitrogen extracted from air was mixed with another gas, leading to an experiment that successfully isolated a new element, argon, from the Greek word ἀργός (argós, "idle" or "lazy"). With this discovery, they realized an entire class of gases was missing from the periodic table. During his search for argon, Ramsay also managed to isolate helium for the first time while heating cleveite, a mineral. In 1902, having accepted the evidence for the elements helium and argon, Dmitri Mendeleev included these noble gases as group 0 in his arrangement of the elements, which would later become the periodic table.

Ramsay continued his search for these gases using the method of fractional distillation to separate liquid air into several components. In 1898, he discovered the elements krypton, neon, and xenon, and named them after the Greek words κρυπτός (kryptós, "hidden"), νέος (néos, "new"), and ξένος (ksénos, "stranger"), respectively. Radon was first identified in 1898 by Friedrich Ernst Dorn, and was named radium emanation, but was not considered a noble gas until 1904 when its characteristics were found to be similar to those of other noble gases. Rayleigh and Ramsay received the 1904 Nobel Prizes in Physics and in Chemistry, respectively, for their discovery of the noble gases; in the words of J. E. Cederblom, then president of the Royal Swedish Academy of Sciences, "the discovery of an entirely new group of elements, of which no single representative had been known with any certainty, is something utterly unique in the history of chemistry, being intrinsically an advance in science of peculiar significance".

The discovery of the noble gases aided in the development of a general understanding of atomic structure. In 1895, French chemist Henri Moissan attempted to form a reaction between fluorine, the most electronegative element, and argon, one of the noble gases, but failed. Scientists were unable to prepare compounds of argon until the end of the 20th century, but these attempts helped to develop new theories of atomic structure. Learning from these experiments, Danish physicist Niels Bohr proposed in 1913 that the electrons in atoms are arranged in shells surrounding the nucleus, and that for all noble gases except helium the outermost shell always contains eight electrons. In 1916, Gilbert N. Lewis formulated the octet rule, which concluded an octet of electrons in the outer shell was the most stable arrangement for any atom; this arrangement caused them to be unreactive with other elements since they did not require any more electrons to complete their outer shell.

In 1962, Neil Bartlett discovered the first chemical compound of a noble gas, xenon hexafluoroplatinate. Compounds of other noble gases were discovered soon after: in 1962 for radon, radon difluoride (RnF_{2}), which was identified by radiotracer techniques and in 1963 for krypton, krypton difluoride (KrF_{2}). The first stable compound of argon was reported in 2000 when argon fluorohydride (HArF) was formed at a temperature of 40 K (−233.2 °C; −387.7 °F).

In October 2006, scientists from the Joint Institute for Nuclear Research and Lawrence Livermore National Laboratory successfully created synthetically oganesson, the seventh element in group 18, by bombarding californium with calcium.

== Physical and atomic properties ==
Property	Helium	Neon	Argon	Krypton	Xenon	Radon	Oganesson
Density (g/dm^{3})	0.1786	0.9002	1.7818	3.708	5.851	9.97	7200 (predicted)
Boiling point (K)	4.4	27.3	87.4	121.5	166.6	211.5	450±10 (predicted)
Melting point (K)	–	24.7	83.6	115.8	161.7	202.2	325±15 (predicted)
Enthalpy of vaporization (kJ/mol)	0.08	1.74	6.52	9.05	12.65	18.1	–
Solubility in water at 20 °C (cm^{3}/kg)	8.61	10.5	33.6	59.4	108.1	230	–
Atomic number	2	10	18	36	54	86	118
Atomic radius (calculated) (pm)	31	38	71	88	108	120	–
Ionization energy (kJ/mol)	2372	2080	1520	1351	1170	1037	839 (predicted)
Electronegativity	4.16	4.79	3.24	2.97	2.58	2.60	2.59

The noble gases have weak interatomic force, and consequently have very low melting and boiling points. They are all monatomic gases under standard conditions, including the elements with larger atomic masses than many normally solid elements. Helium has several unique qualities when compared with other elements: its boiling point at 1 atm is lower than those of any other known substance; it is the only element known to exhibit superfluidity; and, it is the only element that cannot be solidified by cooling at atmospheric pressure (an effect explained by quantum mechanics as its zero point energy is too high to permit freezing) – a pressure of 25 standard atmospheres (2,500 kPa; 370 psi) must be applied at a temperature of 0.95 K (−272.200 °C; −457.960 °F) to convert it to a solid while a pressure of about 113,500 atm (11,500,000 kPa; 1,668,000 psi) is required at room temperature. The noble gases up to xenon have multiple stable isotopes; krypton and xenon also have naturally occurring radioisotopes, namely ^{78}Kr, ^{124}Xe, and ^{136}Xe, all have very long lives (> 10^{21} years) and can undergo double electron capture or double beta decay. Radon has no stable isotopes; its longest-lived isotope, ^{222}Rn, has a half-life of 3.8 days and decays to form helium and polonium, which ultimately decays to lead. Oganesson also has no stable isotopes, and its only known isotope ^{294}Og is very short-lived (half-life 0.7 ms). Melting and boiling points increase going down the group.

This is a plot of ionization potential versus atomic number. The noble gases have the largest ionization potential for each period, although period 7 is expected to break this trend because the predicted first ionization energy of oganesson (Z = 118) is lower than those of elements 110–112.

The noble gas atoms, like atoms in most groups, increase steadily in atomic radius from one period to the next due to the increasing number of electrons. The size of the atom is related to several properties. For example, the ionization potential decreases with an increasing radius because the valence electrons in the larger noble gases are farther away from the nucleus and are therefore not held as tightly together by the atom. Noble gases have the largest ionization potential among the elements of each period, which reflects the stability of their electron configuration and is related to their relative lack of chemical reactivity. Some of the heavier noble gases, however, have ionization potentials small enough to be comparable to those of other elements and molecules. It was the insight that xenon has an ionization potential similar to that of the oxygen molecule that led Bartlett to attempt oxidizing xenon using platinum hexafluoride, an oxidizing agent known to be strong enough to react with oxygen. Noble gases cannot accept an electron to form stable anions; that is, they have a negative electron affinity.

The macroscopic physical properties of the noble gases are dominated by the weak van der Waals forces between the atoms. The attractive force increases with the size of the atom as a result of the increase in polarizability and the decrease in ionization potential. This results in systematic group trends: as one goes down group 18, the atomic radius increases, and with it the interatomic forces increase, resulting in an increasing melting point, boiling point, enthalpy of vaporization, and solubility. The increase in density is due to the increase in atomic mass.

The noble gases are nearly ideal gases under standard conditions, but their deviations from the ideal gas law provided important clues for the study of intermolecular interactions. The Lennard-Jones potential, often used to model intermolecular interactions, was deduced in 1924 by John Lennard-Jones from experimental data on argon before the development of quantum mechanics provided the tools for understanding intermolecular forces from first principles. The theoretical analysis of these interactions became tractable because the noble gases are monatomic and the atoms spherical, which means that the interaction between the atoms is independent of direction, or isotropic.

== Chemical properties ==
Neon, like all noble gases, has a full valence shell. Noble gases have eight electrons in their outermost shell, except in the case of helium, which has two.

The noble gases are colorless, odorless, tasteless, and nonflammable under standard conditions. They were once labeled group 0 in the periodic table because it was believed they had a valence of zero, meaning their atoms cannot combine with those of other elements to form compounds. However, it was later discovered some do indeed form compounds, causing this label to fall into disuse.

=== Electron configuration ===
Like other groups, the members of this family show patterns in its electron configuration, especially the outermost shells, which results in trends in chemical behavior:

Z	Element	Electrons per shell
2	helium	2
10	neon	2, 8
18	argon	2, 8, 8
36	krypton	2, 8, 18, 8
54	xenon	2, 8, 18, 18, 8
86	radon	2, 8, 18, 32, 18, 8
118	oganesson	2, 8, 18, 32, 32, 18, 8 (predicted)

The noble gases have full valence electron shells. Valence electrons are the outermost electrons of an atom and are normally the only electrons that participate in chemical bonding. Atoms with full valence electron shells are extremely stable and therefore do not tend to form chemical bonds and have little tendency to gain or lose electrons. However, heavier noble gases such as radon are held less firmly together by electromagnetic force than lighter noble gases such as helium, making it easier to remove outer electrons from heavy noble gases.

As a result of a full shell, the noble gases can be used in conjunction with the electron configuration notation to form the noble gas notation. To do this, the nearest noble gas that precedes the element in question is written first, and then the electron configuration is continued from that point forward. For example, the electron notation of phosphorus is 1s^{2} 2s^{2} 2p^{6} 3s^{2} 3p^{3}, while the noble gas notation is [Ne] 3s^{2} 3p^{3}. This more compact notation makes it easier to identify elements, and is shorter than writing out the full notation of atomic orbitals.

The noble gases cross the boundary between blocks—helium is an s-element whereas the rest of members are p-elements—which is unusual among the IUPAC groups. All other IUPAC groups contain elements from one block each. This causes some inconsistencies in trends across the table, and on those grounds some chemists have proposed that helium should be moved to group 2 to be with other s^{2} elements, but this change has not generally been adopted.

=== Compounds ===
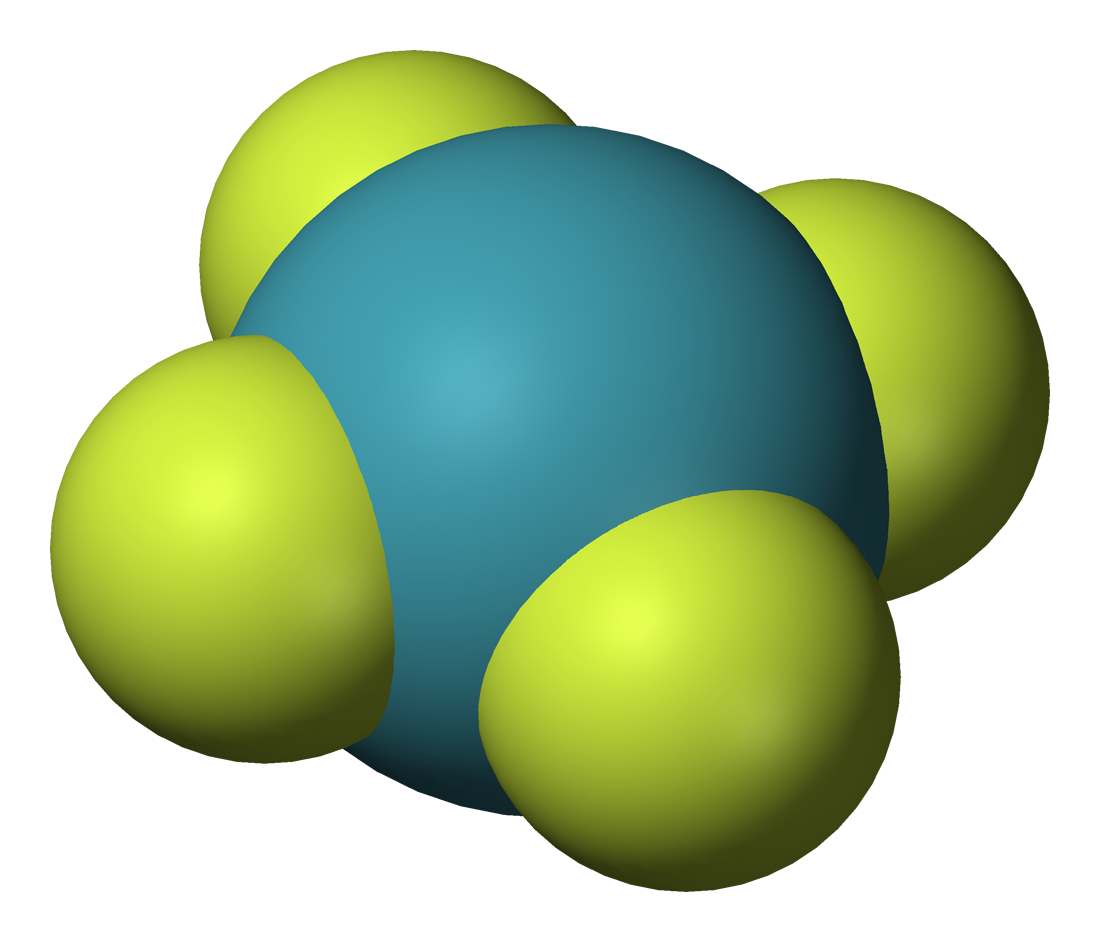
Structure of xenon tetrafluoride (XeF_{4}), one of the first noble gas compounds to be discovered

The noble gases show extremely low chemical reactivity; consequently, only a few hundred noble gas compounds have been formed. Neutral compounds in which helium and neon are involved in chemical bonds have not been formed (although some helium-containing ions exist and there is some theoretical evidence for a few neutral helium-containing ones), while xenon, krypton, and argon have shown only minor reactivity.

In 1933, Linus Pauling predicted that the heavier noble gases could form compounds with fluorine and oxygen. He predicted the existence of krypton hexafluoride (KrF_{6}) and xenon hexafluoride (XeF_{6}) and speculated that xenon octafluoride (XeF_{8}) might exist as an unstable compound, and suggested that xenic acid could form perxenate salts. These predictions were shown to be generally accurate, except that XeF_{8} is now thought to be both thermodynamically and kinetically unstable.

Xenon compounds are the most numerous of the noble gas compounds that have been formed. Most of them have the xenon atom in the oxidation state of +2, +4, +6, or +8 bonded to highly electronegative atoms such as fluorine or oxygen, as in xenon difluoride (XeF_{2}), xenon tetrafluoride (XeF_{4}), xenon hexafluoride (XeF_{6}), xenon tetroxide (XeO_{4}), and sodium perxenate (Na_{4}XeO_{6}). Xenon reacts with fluorine to form numerous xenon fluorides according to the following equations:

Xe + F_{2} → XeF_{2}
Xe + 2 F_{2} → XeF_{4}
Xe + 3 F_{2} → XeF_{6}

Some of these compounds have found use in chemical synthesis as oxidizing agents; XeF_{2}, in particular, is commercially available and can be used as a fluorinating agent. As of 2007, about five hundred compounds of xenon bonded to other elements have been identified, including organoxenon compounds (containing xenon bonded to carbon), and xenon bonded to nitrogen, chlorine, gold, mercury, and xenon itself. Compounds of xenon bound to boron, hydrogen, bromine, iodine, beryllium, sulfur, titanium, copper, and silver have also been observed but only at low temperatures in noble gas matrices, or in supersonic noble gas jets.

Radon is more reactive than xenon, and forms chemical bonds more easily than xenon does. However, due to the high radioactivity and short half-life of radon isotopes, only a few fluorides and oxides of radon have been formed in practice. Radon goes further towards metallic behavior than xenon; the difluoride RnF_{2} is highly ionic, and cationic Rn^{2+} is formed in halogen fluoride solutions. For this reason, kinetic hindrance makes it difficult to oxidize radon beyond the +2 state. Only tracer experiments appear to have succeeded in doing so, probably forming RnF_{4}, RnF_{6}, and RnO_{3}.

Krypton is less reactive than xenon, but several compounds have been reported with krypton in the oxidation state of +2. Krypton difluoride is the most notable and easily characterized. Under extreme conditions, krypton reacts with fluorine to form KrF_{2} according to the following equation:

Kr + F_{2} → KrF_{2}

Compounds in which krypton forms a single bond to nitrogen and oxygen have also been characterized, but are only stable below −60 °C (−76 °F; 213 K) and −90 °C (−130 °F; 183 K) respectively.

Krypton atoms chemically bound to other nonmetals (hydrogen, chlorine, carbon) as well as some late transition metals (copper, silver, gold) have also been observed, but only either at low temperatures in noble gas matrices, or in supersonic noble gas jets. Similar conditions were used to obtain the first few compounds of argon in 2000, such as argon fluorohydride (HArF), and some bound to the late transition metals copper, silver, and gold. As of 2007, no stable neutral molecules involving covalently bound helium or neon are known.

Extrapolation from periodic trends predict that oganesson should be the most reactive of the noble gases; more sophisticated theoretical treatments indicate greater reactivity than such extrapolations suggest, to the point where the applicability of the descriptor "noble gas" has been questioned. Oganesson is expected to be rather like silicon or tin in group 14: a reactive element with a common +4 and a less common +2 state, which at room temperature and pressure is not a gas but rather a solid semiconductor. Empirical / experimental testing will be required to validate these predictions. (On the other hand, flerovium, despite being in group 14, is predicted to be unusually volatile, which suggests noble gas-like properties.)

The noble gases—including helium—can form stable molecular ions in the gas phase. The simplest is the helium hydride molecular ion, HeH^{+}, discovered in 1925. Because it is composed of the two most abundant elements in the universe, hydrogen and helium, it was believed to occur naturally in the interstellar medium, and it was finally detected in April 2019 using the airborne SOFIA telescope. Cations of noble gases, particularly Kr^{+} and Xe^{+}, and Lewis bases with high ionization energy can form stable adduct ions. In addition to these ions, there are many known neutral excimers of the noble gases. These are compounds such as ArF and KrF that are stable only when in an excited electronic state; some of them find application in excimer lasers.

In addition to the compounds where a noble gas atom is involved in a covalent bond, noble gases also form non-covalent compounds. The clathrates, first described in 1949, consist of a noble gas atom trapped within cavities of crystal lattices of certain organic and inorganic substances. The essential condition for their formation is that the guest (noble gas) atoms must be of appropriate size to fit in the cavities of the host crystal lattice. For instance, argon, krypton, and xenon form clathrates with hydroquinone, but helium and neon do not because they are too small or insufficiently polarizable to be retained. Neon, argon, krypton, and xenon also form clathrate hydrates, where the noble gas is trapped in ice.

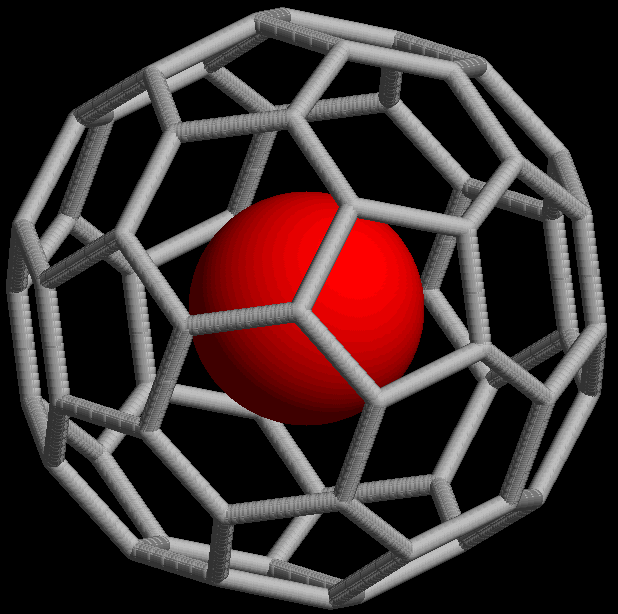
An endohedral fullerene compound containing a noble gas atom

Noble gases can form endohedral fullerene compounds, in which the noble gas atom is trapped inside a fullerene molecule. In 1993, it was discovered that when C_{60}, a spherical molecule consisting of 60 carbon atoms, is exposed to noble gases at high pressure, complexes such as He@C_{60} can be formed (the @ notation indicates He is contained inside C_{60} but not covalently bound to it). As of 2008, endohedral complexes with helium, neon, argon, krypton, and xenon have been created. These compounds have found use in the study of the structure and reactivity of fullerenes by means of the nuclear magnetic resonance of the noble gas atom.

Bonding in XeF_{2} according to the 3-center-4-electron bond model

Noble gas compounds such as xenon difluoride (XeF_{2}) are considered to be hypervalent because they violate the octet rule. Bonding in such compounds can be explained using a three-center four-electron bond model. This model, first proposed in 1951, considers bonding of three collinear atoms. For example, bonding in XeF_{2} is described by a set of three molecular orbitals (MOs) derived from p-orbitals on each atom. Bonding results from the combination of a filled p-orbital from Xe with one half-filled p-orbital from each F atom, resulting in a filled bonding orbital, a filled non-bonding orbital, and an empty antibonding orbital. The highest occupied molecular orbital is localized on the two terminal atoms. This represents a localization of charge that is facilitated by the high electronegativity of fluorine.

The chemistry of the heavier noble gases, krypton and xenon, are well established. The chemistry of the lighter ones, argon and helium, is still at an early stage, while a neon compound is yet to be identified.

== Occurrence ==
The abundances of the noble gases in the universe decrease as their atomic numbers increase. Helium is the most common element in the universe after hydrogen, with a mass fraction of about 24%. Most of the helium in the universe was formed during Big Bang nucleosynthesis, but the amount of helium is steadily increasing due to the fusion of hydrogen in stellar nucleosynthesis (and, to a very slight degree, the alpha decay of heavy elements).

Abundances on Earth follow different trends; for example, helium is only the third most abundant noble gas in the atmosphere. The reason is that there is no primordial helium in the atmosphere; due to the small mass of the atom, helium cannot be retained by the Earth's gravitational field. Helium on Earth comes from the alpha decay of heavy elements such as uranium and thorium found in the Earth's crust, and tends to accumulate in natural gas deposits. The abundance of argon, on the other hand, is increased as a result of the beta decay of potassium-40, also found in the Earth's crust, to form argon-40, which is the most abundant isotope of argon on Earth despite being relatively rare in the Solar System. This process is the basis for the potassium–argon dating method.

Xenon has an unexpectedly low abundance in the atmosphere, in what has been called the missing xenon problem; one theory is that the missing xenon may be trapped in minerals inside the Earth's crust. Radon is formed in the lithosphere by the alpha decay of radium. It can seep into buildings through cracks in their foundation and accumulate in areas that are not well ventilated. Due to its high radioactivity, radon presents a significant health hazard; it is implicated in an estimated 21,000 lung cancer deaths per year in the United States alone. Oganesson does not occur in nature and is instead created manually by scientists.

For large-scale use, helium is extracted by fractional distillation from natural gas, which can contain up to 7% helium.

Element		Abundance in ...						Price	
Z	Name	Solar System (per Si atom)		Earth atmosphere (ppm, volume)		Igneous rock (ppm, mass)		2004 (USD/m^{3})	
2	Helium	#1	2343	#3	5.20	#2	3 × 10^{−3}	#2	Ind*: 4.20–4.90; Lab: 22.30–44.90
10	Neon	#2	2.148	#2	18.20	#3	7 × 10^{−5}	#3	60–120
18	Argon	#3	0.1025	#1	9340.00	#1	4 × 10^{−2}	#1	2.70–8.50
36	Krypton	#4	5.515 × 10^{−5}	#4	1.10	–		#4	400–500
54	Xenon	#5	5.391 × 10^{−6}	#5	0.09	–		#5	4000–5000
86	Radon	–		#6	0.06 × 10^{−19} to 18 × 10^{−19}	#4	1.7 × 10^{−10}	–	

* Ind (Industrial grade); Lab (Lab grade)

== Extraction ==
Neon, argon, krypton, and xenon are obtained from air using the methods of liquefaction of gases, to convert elements to a liquid state, and fractional distillation, to separate mixtures into component parts. Helium is typically produced by separating it from natural gas, and radon is isolated from the radioactive decay of radium compounds. The prices of the noble gases are influenced by their natural abundance, with argon being the cheapest and xenon the most expensive. As an example, the adjacent table lists the 2004 prices in the United States for laboratory quantities of each gas.

== Biological chemistry ==
None of the elements in this group has any biological importance.

== Applications ==
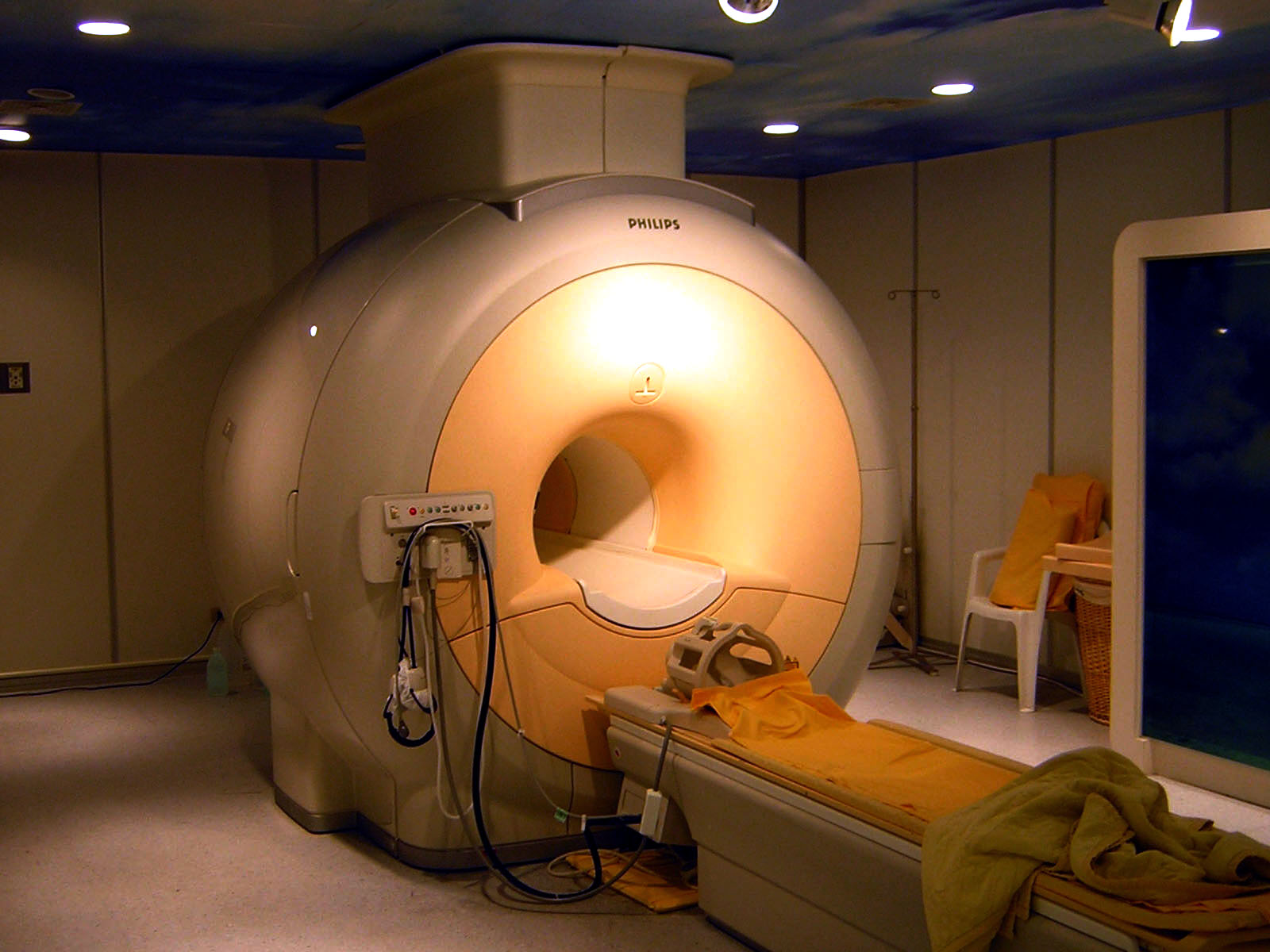
Liquid helium is used to cool superconducting magnets in modern MRI scanners.

Noble gases have very low boiling and melting points, which makes them useful as cryogenic refrigerants. In particular, liquid helium, which boils at 4.2 K (−268.95 °C; −452.11 °F), is used for superconducting magnets, such as those needed in nuclear magnetic resonance imaging and nuclear magnetic resonance. Liquid neon, although it does not reach temperatures as low as liquid helium, also finds use in cryogenics because it has over 40 times more refrigerating capacity than liquid helium and over three times more than liquid hydrogen.

Helium is used as a component of breathing gases to replace nitrogen, due its low solubility in fluids, especially in lipids. Gases are absorbed by the blood and body tissues when under pressure like in scuba diving, which causes an anesthetic effect known as nitrogen narcosis. Due to its reduced solubility, little helium is taken into cell membranes, and when helium is used to replace part of the breathing mixtures, such as in trimix or heliox, a decrease in the narcotic effect of the gas at depth is obtained. Helium's reduced solubility offers further advantages for the condition known as decompression sickness, or the bends. The reduced amount of dissolved gas in the body means that fewer gas bubbles form during the decrease in pressure of the ascent. Another noble gas, argon, is considered the best option for use as a drysuit inflation gas for scuba diving. Helium is also used as filling gas in nuclear fuel rods for nuclear reactors.

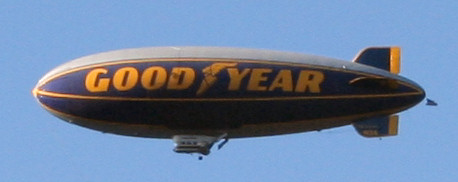
Goodyear Blimp

Since the Hindenburg disaster in 1937, helium has replaced hydrogen as a lifting gas in blimps and balloons: despite an 8.6% decrease in buoyancy compared to hydrogen, helium is not combustible.

In many applications, the noble gases are used to provide an inert atmosphere. Argon is used in the synthesis of air-sensitive compounds that are sensitive to nitrogen. Solid argon is also used for the study of very unstable compounds, such as reactive intermediates, by trapping them in an inert matrix at very low temperatures. Helium is used as the carrier medium in gas chromatography, as a filler gas for thermometers, and in devices for measuring radiation, such as the Geiger counter and the bubble chamber. Helium and argon are both commonly used to shield welding arcs and the surrounding base metal from the atmosphere during welding and cutting, as well as in other metallurgical processes and in the production of silicon for the semiconductor industry.

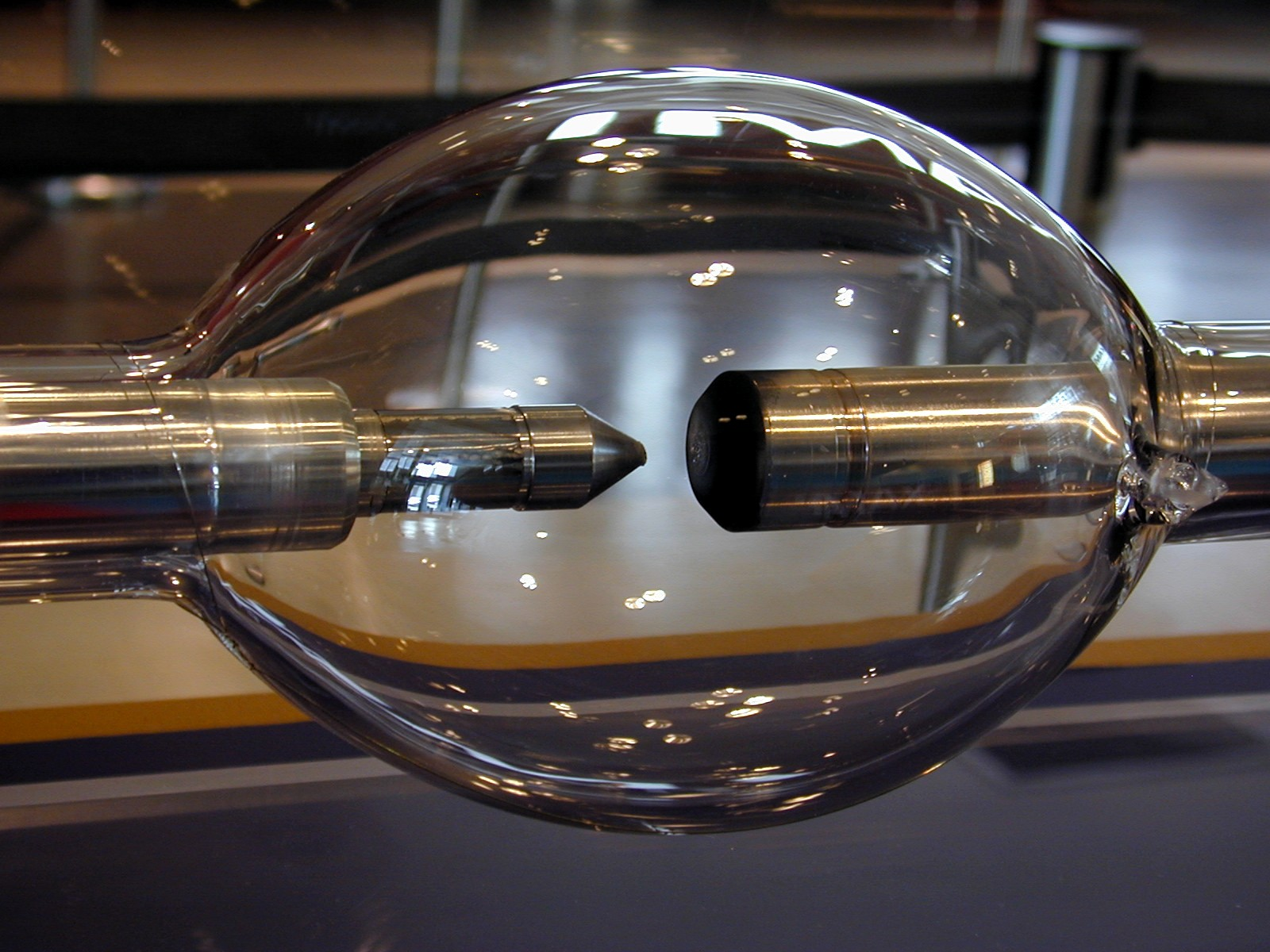
15,000-watt xenon short-arc lamp used in IMAX projectors

Noble gases are commonly used in lighting because of their lack of chemical reactivity. Argon, mixed with nitrogen, is used as a filler gas for incandescent light bulbs. Krypton is used in high-performance light bulbs, which have higher color temperatures and greater efficiency, because it reduces the rate of evaporation of the filament more than argon; halogen lamps, in particular, use krypton mixed with small amounts of compounds of iodine or bromine. The noble gases glow in distinctive colors when used inside gas-discharge lamps, such as "neon lights". These lights are called after neon but often contain other gases and phosphors, which add various hues to the orange-red color of neon. Xenon is commonly used in xenon arc lamps, which, due to their nearly continuous spectrum that resembles daylight, find application in film projectors.

The noble gases are used in excimer lasers, which are based on short-lived electronically excited molecules known as excimers. The excimers used for lasers may be noble gas dimers such as Ar_{2}, Kr_{2} or Xe_{2}, or more commonly, the noble gas is combined with a halogen in excimers such as ArF, KrF, XeF, or XeCl. These lasers produce ultraviolet light, which, due to its short wavelength (193 nm for ArF and 248 nm for KrF), allows for high-precision imaging. Excimer lasers have many industrial, medical, and scientific applications. They are used for microlithography and microfabrication, which are essential for integrated circuit manufacture, and for laser surgery, including laser angioplasty and eye surgery.

Some noble gases have direct application in medicine. Helium is sometimes used to improve the ease of breathing of people with asthma. Xenon is used as an anesthetic because of its high solubility in lipids, which makes it more potent than the usual nitrous oxide, and because it is readily eliminated from the body, resulting in faster recovery. Xenon finds application in medical imaging of the lungs through hyperpolarized MRI. Radon, which is highly radioactive and is only available in minute amounts, is used in radiotherapy.

Noble gases, particularly xenon, are predominantly used in ion engines due to their inertness. Since ion engines are not driven by chemical reactions, chemically inert fuels are desired to prevent unwanted reaction between the fuel and anything else on the engine.

Oganesson is too unstable to work with and has no known application other than research.

=== Noble gases in Earth sciences application ===
The relative isotopic abundances of noble gases serve as an important geochemical tracing tool in earth science. They can unravel the Earth's degassing history and its effects to the surrounding environment (i.e., atmosphere composition). Due to their inert nature and low abundances, change in the noble gas concentration and their isotopic ratios can be used to resolve and quantify the processes influencing their current signatures across geological settings.

==== Helium ====
Helium has two abundant isotopes: helium-3, which is primordial with high abundance in earth's core and mantle, and helium-4, which originates from decay of radionuclides (^{232}Th, ^{235,238}U) abundant in the earth's crust. Isotopic ratios of helium are represented by R_{A} value, a value relative to air measurement (^{3}He/^{4}He = 1.39*10^{−6}). Volatiles that originate from the earth's crust have a 0.02-0.05 R_{A}, which indicate an enrichment of helium-4. Volatiles that originate from deeper sources such as subcontinental lithospheric mantle (SCLM), have a 6.1± 0.9 R_{A} and mid-oceanic ridge basalts (MORB) display higher values (8 ± 1 R_{A}). Mantle plume samples have even higher values than > 8 R_{A}. Solar wind, which represent an unmodified primordial signature is reported to have ~ 330 R_{A}.

==== Neon ====
Neon has three main stable isotopes:^{20}Ne, ^{21}Ne and ^{22}Ne, with ^{20}Ne produced by cosmic nucleogenic reactions, causing high abundance in the atmosphere. ^{21}Ne and ^{22}Ne are produced in the earth's crust as a result of interactions between alpha and neutron particles with light elements; ^{18}O, ^{19}F and ^{24,25}Mg. The neon ratios (^{20}Ne/^{22}Ne and ^{21}Ne/^{22}Ne) are systematically used to discern the heterogeneity in the Earth's mantle and volatile sources. Complimenting He isotope data, neon isotope data additionally provide insight to thermal evolution of Earth's systems.

^{20}Ne/^{22}Ne	^{21}Ne/^{22}Ne	Endmember
9.8	0.029	Air
12.5	0.0677	MORB
13.81	0.0330	Solar Wind
0	3.30±0.2	Archean Crust
0	0.47	Precambrian Crust

==== Argon ====
Argon has three stable isotopes: ^{36}Ar, ^{38}Ar and ^{40}Ar. ^{36}Ar and ^{38}Ar are primordial, with their inventory on the earth's crust dependent on the equilibration of meteoric water with the crustal fluids. This explains huge inventory of ^{36}Ar in the atmosphere. Production of these two isotopes (^{36}Ar and ^{38}Ar) is negligible within the earth's crust, only limited concentrations of ^{38}Ar can be produced by interaction between alpha particles from decay of ^{235, 238}U and ^{232}Th and light elements (^{37}Cl and ^{41}K). While ^{36}Ar is continuously being produced by Beta-decay of ^{36}Cl. ^{40}Ar is a product of radiogenic decay of ^{40}K. Different endmembers values for ^{40}Ar/^{36}Ar have been reported; Air = 295.5, MORB = 40,000, and crust = 3000.

==== Krypton ====
Krypton has several isotopes, with ^{78, 80, 82}Kr being primordial, while ^{83, 84, 86}Kr results from spontaneous fission of ^{244}Pu and radiogenic decay of ^{238}U. Krypton's isotopes geochemical signature in mantle reservoirs resembling the modern atmosphere. preserves the solar-like primordial signature. Krypton isotopes have been used to decipher the mechanism of volatiles delivery to earth's system, which had great implication to evolution of earth (nitrogen, oxygen, and oxygen) and emergence of life. This is largely due to a clear distinction of krypton isotope signature from various sources such as chondritic material, solar wind and cometary.

==== Xenon ====
Xenon has nine isotopes, most of which are produced by the radiogenic decay. Krypton and xenon noble gases requires pristine, robust geochemical sampling protocol to avoid atmospheric contamination. Furthermore, sophisticated instrumentation is required to resolve mass peaks among many isotopes with narrow mass difference during analysis.

^{129}Xe/^{130}Xe	Endmember
6,496	Air
7.7	MORB
6.7	OIB Galapagos
6.8	OIB Icelands

==== Sampling of noble gases ====
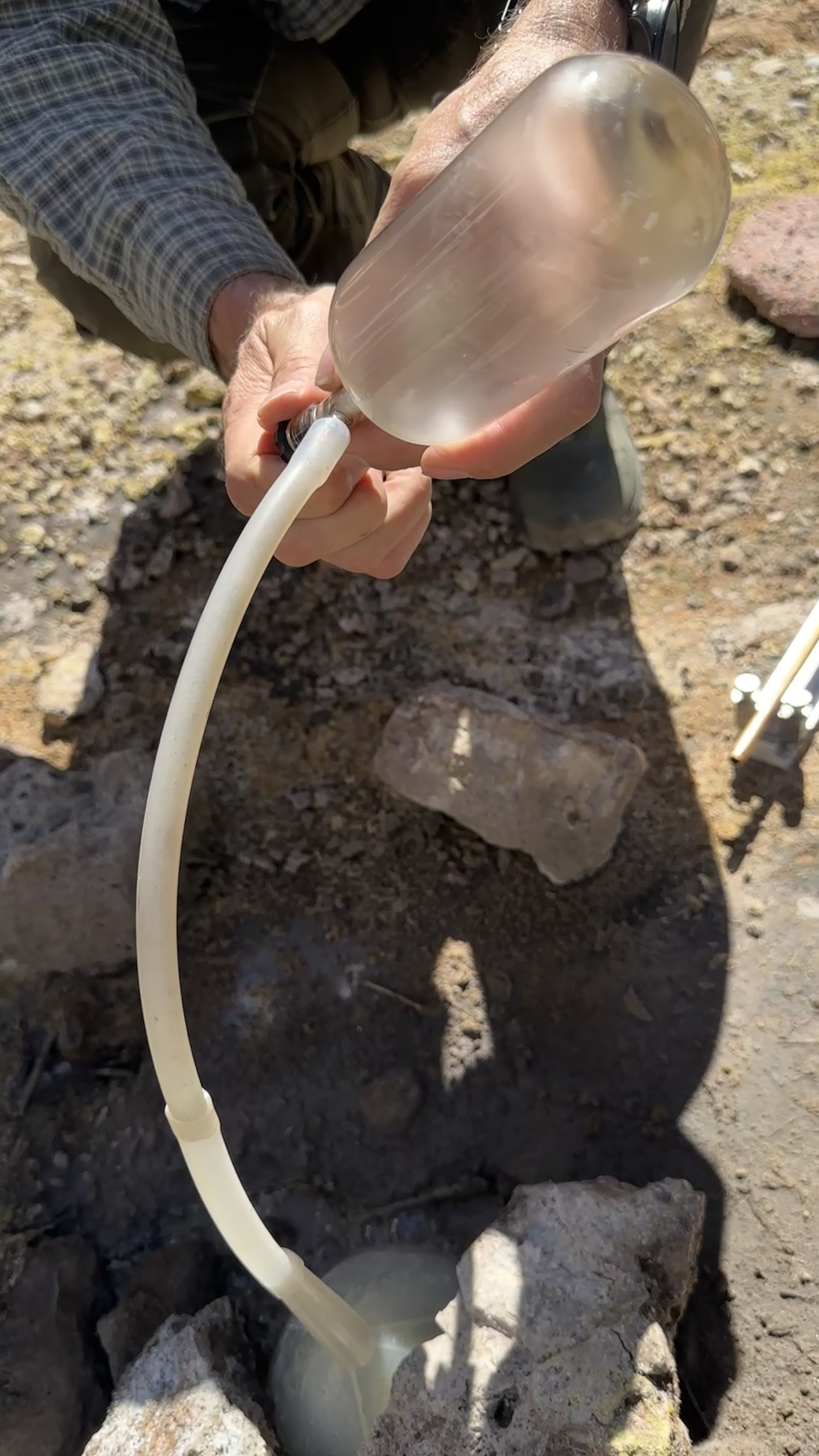
Sampling of noble gases using a Giggenbach bottle, a funnel is placed on top of the hot spring to focus the stream of sample towards the bottle via the Tygon tube. A geochemist is controlling the flow of the sample inlet using a Teflon valve. Note the condensation process inside the evacuated Giggenbach bottle.

Noble gas measurements can be obtained from sources like volcanic vents, springs, and geothermal wells following specific sampling protocols. The classic specific sampling protocol include the following.

- Copper tubes - These are standard refrigeration copper tubes, cut to ~10 cm^{3} with a 3/8" outer diameter, and are used for sampling volatile discharges by connecting an inverted funnel to the tube via TygonⓇ tubing, ensuring one-way inflow and preventing air contamination. Their malleability allows for cold welding or pinching off to seal the ends after sufficient flushing with the sample.
- Giggenbach bottles – Giggenbach bottles are evacuated glass flasks with a Teflon stopcock, used for sampling and storing gases. They require pre-evacuation before sampling, as noble gases accumulate in the headspace. These bottles were first invented and distributed by a Werner F. Giggenbach, a German chemist.

===== Analysis of noble gases =====
Noble gases have numerous isotopes and subtle mass variation that requires high-precision detection systems. Originally, scientists used magnetic sector mass spectrometry, which is time-consuming and has low sensitivity due to "peak jumping mode". Multiple-collector mass spectrometers, like Quadrupole mass spectrometers (QMS), enable simultaneous detection of isotopes, improving sensitivity and throughput. Before analysis, sample preparation is essential due to the low abundance of noble gases, involving extraction, purification system. Extraction allows liberation of noble gases from their carrier (major phase; fluid or solid) while purification remove impurities and improve concentration per unit sample volume. Cryogenic traps are used for sequential analysis without peak interference by stepwise temperature raise.

Research labs have successfully developed miniaturized field-based mass spectrometers, which can analyze noble gases with an analytical uncertainty of 1–3% using low-cost vacuum systems and quadrupole mass analyzers.

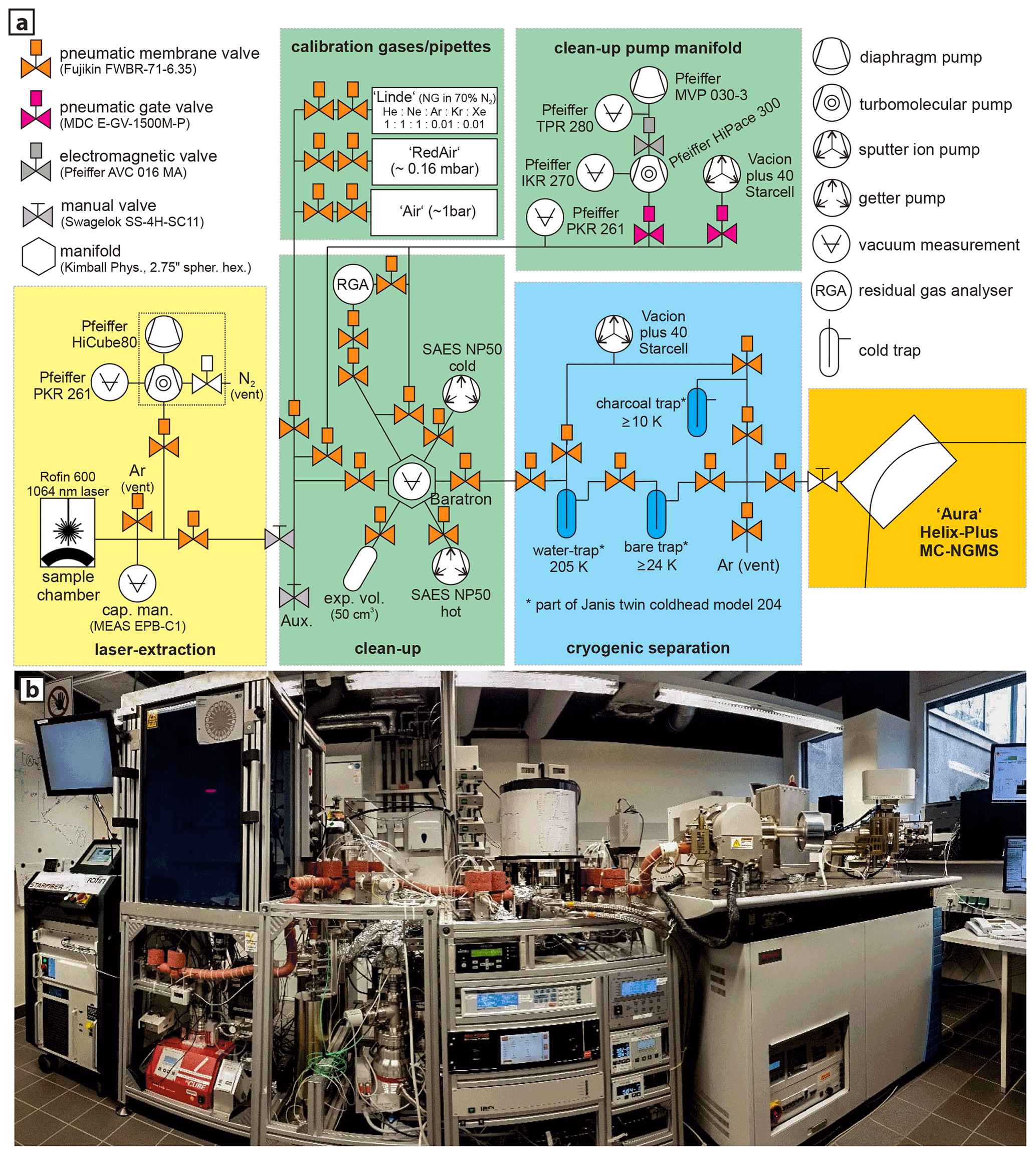
Extraction and purification (clean up) mass spectrometer line

== See also ==
- Inert gas, for any gas that is not reactive under normal circumstances.
- Industrial gas
- Noble gas (data page), for extended tables of physical properties.
- Noble metal, for metals that are resistant to corrosion or oxidation.
- Octet rule
