= Xenon oxide =

Xenon oxide may refer to:

- Xenon dioxide, XeO_{2}, an unstable oxide also known as Xenon(IV) oxide
- Xenon trioxide, XeO_{3}, an unstable oxide
- Xenon tetroxide, XeO_{4}, an oxide stable below −35.9 °C
