= Xenon oxydifluoride =

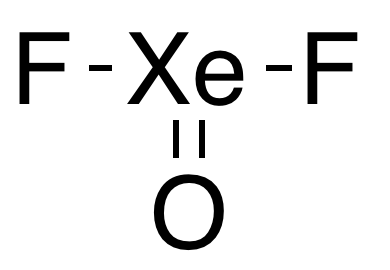

Names
- IUPAC name difluoro(oxo)xenon

Identifiers
CAS Number	13780-64-8
3D model (JSmol)	Interactive image
PubChem CID	60211072
CompTox Dashboard (EPA)	DTXSID001336755
- InChI: InChI=1S/F2OXe/c1-4(2)3 Key: AJCPXXGFGZRPPK-UHFFFAOYSA-N
- SMILES: O=[Xe](F)F

Properties
Chemical formula	F_{2}OXe
Molar mass	185.289 g·mol^{−1}

Structure
Molecular shape	T-shape

Related compounds
Related compounds	Xenon oxytetrafluoride Xenon dioxydifluoride
- Except where otherwise noted, data are given for materials in their standard state (at 25 °C [77 °F], 100 kPa). Infobox references

Xenon oxydifluoride is an inorganic compound with the molecular formula XeOF_{2}. The first definitive isolation of the compound was published on 3 March 2007, producing it by the previously-examined route of partial hydrolysis of xenon tetrafluoride.

XeF_{4} + H_{2}O → XeOF_{2} + 2 HF

The compound has a T-shaped geometry. It is a weak Lewis acid, adducing acetonitrile and forming the trifluoroxenate(IV) ion in hydrogen fluoride. With strong fluoride acceptors, the latter generates the hydroxydifluoroxenonium(IV) ion (HOXeF^{+}_{2}), suggesting a certain Brønsted basicity as well.

Although stable at low temperatures, it rapidly decomposes upon warming, either by losing the oxygen atom or by disproportionating into xenon difluoride and xenon dioxydifluoride:

2 XeOF_{2} → 2 XeF_{2} + O_{2}
2 XeOF_{2} → XeF_{2} + XeO_{2}F_{2}
