= Monosodium xenate =

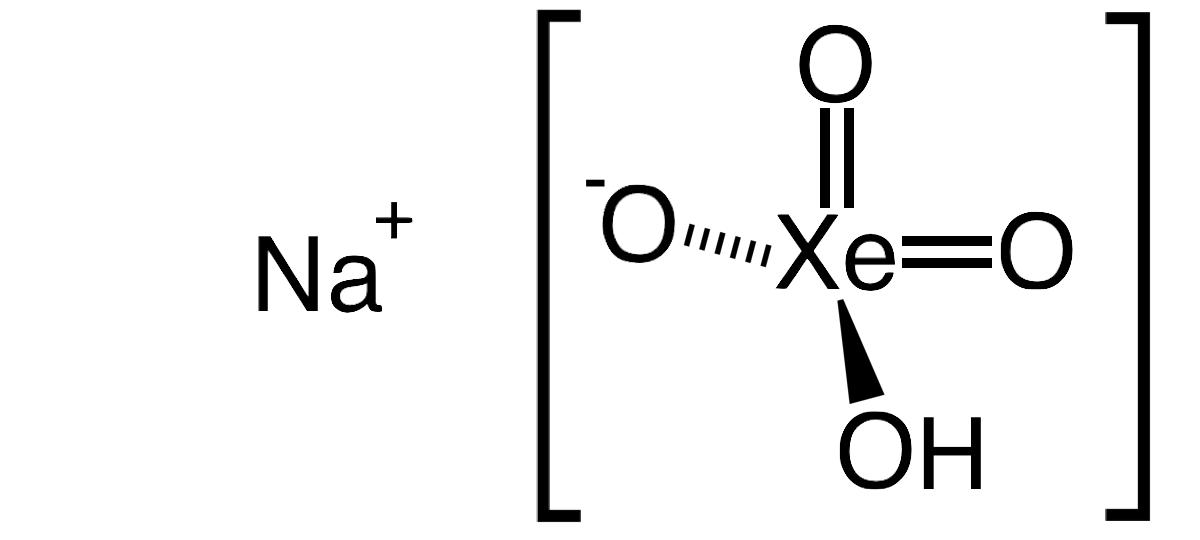

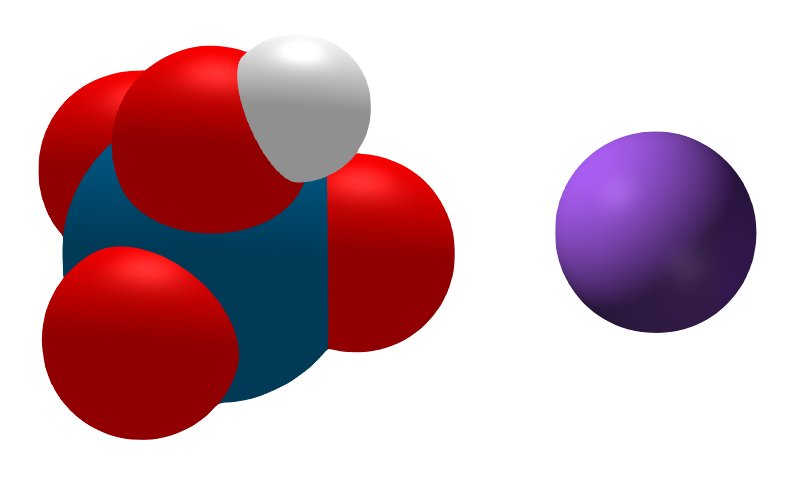

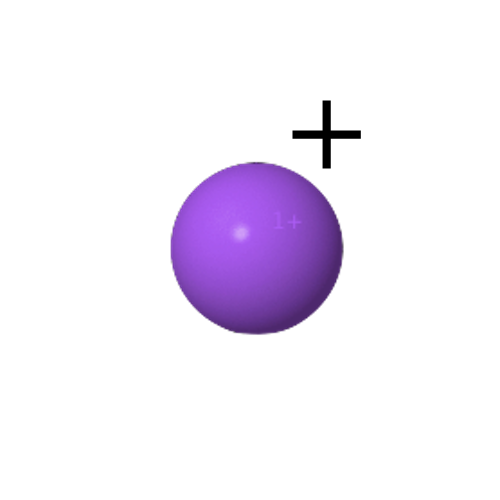
One sodium cation and one xenate anion
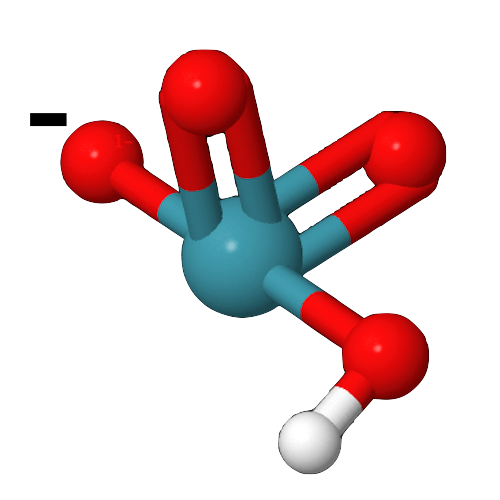
Ball-and-stick model of the component ions

Identifiers
3D model (JSmol)	Interactive image
- InChI: InChI=1S/Na.HO4Xe/c;1-5(2,3)4/h;1H/q+1;-1 Key: PTXWSTYDNKDRED-UHFFFAOYSA-N
- SMILES: [Na+].O[Xe](=O)(=O)[O-]

Properties
Chemical formula	NaHXeO_{4}
Molar mass	219.29 g/mol
Appearance	White solid
Solubility in water	Soluble, decomposes in water
Solubility	insoluble chloroform, methanol, ethanol, and carbon tetrachloride

Hazards
- Occupational safety and health (OHS/OSH)
Main hazards	extremely unstable, vigorous oxidizer
NFPA 704 (fire diamond)	4 0 4 OX
Flash point	Non-Flammable
- Except where otherwise noted, data are given for materials in their standard state (at 25 °C [77 °F], 100 kPa). Infobox references

Monosodium xenate is the sodium salt of xenic acid with formula NaHXeO_{4}. It is a powerful oxidizer, owing to being a highly reactive compound of xenon.

== Synthesis ==
Monosodium xenate can be made by mixing solutions of xenon trioxide and sodium hydroxide, followed by freezing to liquid nitrogen temperatures, and dehydrating in a vacuum.

== Properties ==
Monosodium xenate usually exists in the sesquihydrate form, with 1.5 waters of hydration per unit molecule. It is stable up to 160 °C heated in a pure state. However it can explode when subjected to mechanical shock, or lower temperatures when mixed with XeO_{3}. Sodium xenate is slightly toxic with a median lethal dose between 15 and 30 mg/kg of body weight in mice. Xenate leaves the body very quickly. In mice, the level in blood drops by half in twenty seconds due to it being decomposed and exhaled. In the peritoneum the half-life extends to six minutes.

The dialkali xenates XeO_{4}^{2-} have not been discovered, as xenate disproportionates in more alkaline conditions, hence it being rare to the find the dialkaline salt Na_{2}XeO_{4}.
