= Xenon dioxide =

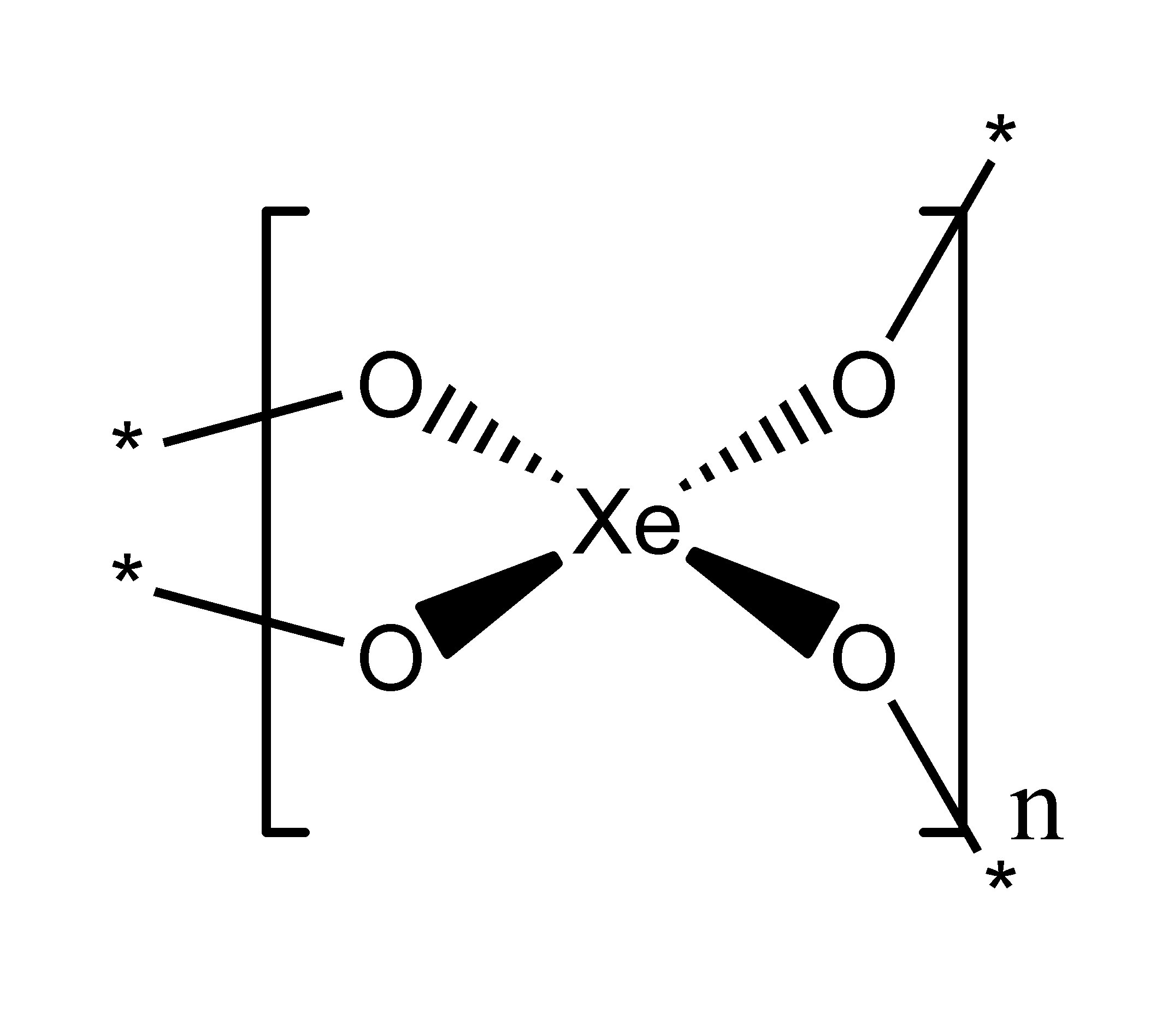

Names
- IUPAC name xenon dioxide

Identifiers
CAS Number	15792-90-2
3D model (JSmol)	Interactive image
ChemSpider	26667799
- InChI: InChI=1S/O2Xe/c1-3-2 Key: BMYPQOLESFVQPA-UHFFFAOYSA-N
- SMILES: O=[Xe]=O

Properties
Chemical formula	XeO_{2}
Molar mass	163.29 g/mol
Appearance	yellow solid

Structure
Molecular shape	Bent

Related compounds
Related compounds	Xenon trioxide Xenon tetroxide
- Except where otherwise noted, data are given for materials in their standard state (at 25 °C [77 °F], 100 kPa). Infobox references

Xenon dioxide, or xenon(IV) oxide, is a compound of xenon and oxygen with formula XeO_{2} which was synthesized in 2011. It is synthesized at 0 °C by hydrolysis of xenon tetrafluoride in aqueous sulfuric acid:

XeF_{4} + 2H_{2}O → XeO_{2} + 4HF

== Structure ==
XeO_{2} has an extended (chain or network) structure in which xenon and oxygen have coordination numbers of four and two respectively. The geometry at xenon is square planar, consistent with VSEPR theory for four ligands and two lone pairs (or AX_{4}E_{2} in the notation of VSEPR theory).

The XeO_{2} network does not share a crystal structure of SiO2 (which has tetrahedral coordination at Si), but XeO_{2} units are believed to intermix with SiO_{2} in Earth's mantle. Computational studies suggest that xenon cannot displace silicon directly, but can fill pre-existing silicon vacancies. The stability of the resulting material under standard conditions depends on its allotrope. Patterned off quartz, it likely decomposes; but materials patterned off fibrous silica may be metastable. This mechanism is a proposed explanation for why xenon is depleted in Earth's atmosphere relative to the atmospheres of gas giants.

In addition, the existence of an XeO_{2} molecule was predicted by an ab initio quantum chemistry method several years earlier by Pyykkö and Tamm, but these authors did not consider an extended structure.

== Properties ==
XeO_{2} is a yellow-orange solid. It is an unstable compound, with a half-life of about two minutes, disproportionating into XeO_{3} and xenon gas. Its structure and identity was confirmed by cooling it to −150 °C so that Raman spectroscopy could be performed before it decomposed.

At -78 °C, the majority of XeO_{2} decomposed over a period of 72 hours, which was identified by the fading of the original yellow product to a pale yellow. Almost all yellow color indicating pure XeO_{2} disappeared over the span of 1 week.

3 XeO_{2} → Xe + 2 XeO_{3}
