= Xenic acid =

Structural formula
Ball-and-stick model of xenic acid

Identifiers
| CAS Number | 1402134-83-1 |
| 3D model (JSmol) | Interactive image |
| ChemSpider | 10466143 |
| PubChem CID | 23422578 |
| CompTox Dashboard (EPA) | DTXSID701027094 |
- InChI: InChI=1S/H2O4Xe/c1-5(2,3)4/h1-2H Key: HRLLZBGOCZURJC-UHFFFAOYSA-N; InChI=1/H2O4Xe/c1-5(2,3)4/h1-2H Key: HRLLZBGOCZURJC-UHFFFAOYAW
- SMILES: O[Xe](O)(=O)=O

Properties
| Chemical formula | H_{2}XeO_{4} |
| Molar mass | 197.31 g/mol |
| Acidity (pK_{a}) | ≈10 |

Related compounds
| Related compounds | Perxenic acid Xenon trioxide |
- Except where otherwise noted, data are given for materials in their standard state (at 25 °C [77 °F], 100 kPa). verify (what is ?) Infobox references

Xenic acid is a proposed noble gas compound with the chemical formula H_{2}XeO_{4} or XeO_{2}(OH)_{2}. It has not been isolated, and the published characterization data are ambiguous.

Salts of xenic acid are called xenates, containing the HXeO^{−}_{4} anion, such as monosodium xenate. They tend to disproportionate into xenon gas and perxenates:

2 HXeO^{−}_{4} + 2 OH^{−} → XeO^{4−}_{6} + Xe + O_{2} + 2 H_{2}O

The energy given off is sufficient to form ozone from diatomic oxygen:

3 O_{2} (g) → 2 O_{3} (g)

Salts containing the deprotonated anion XeO^{2−}_{4} are presently unknown.
