= Xenon dioxydifluoride =

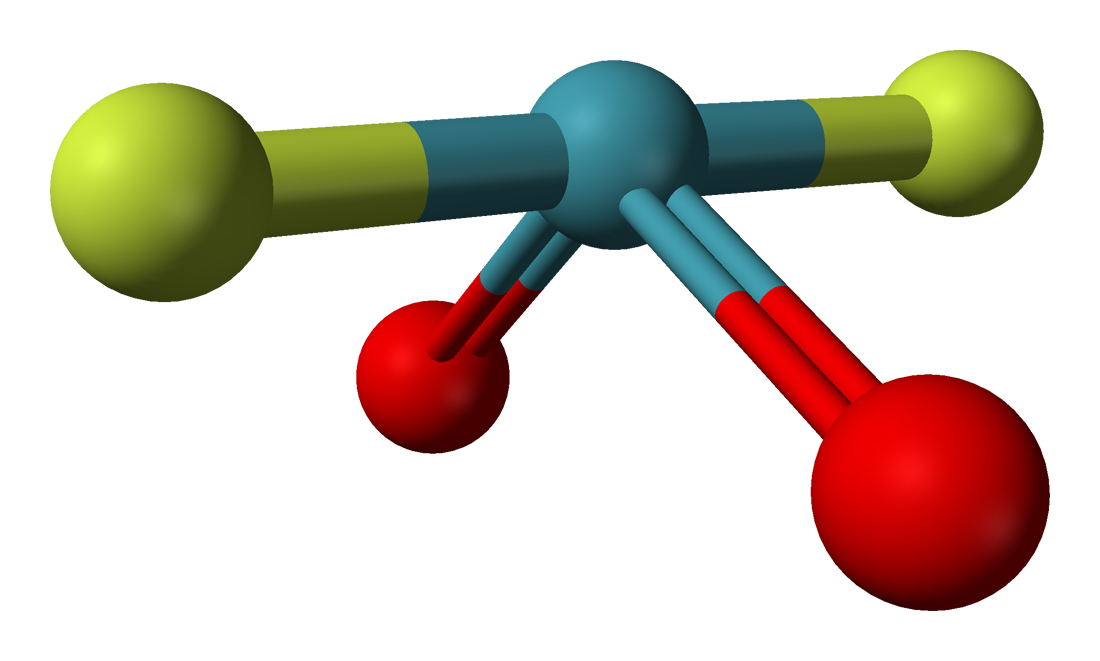

Names
- IUPAC name Difluoro(dioxo)xenon
- Other names Xenon(VI) dioxide difluoride

Identifiers
CAS Number	13875-06-4
3D model (JSmol)	Interactive image
ChemSpider	10329748
PubChem CID	23236530
- InChI: InChI=1S/F2O2Xe/c1-5(2,3)4
- SMILES: O=[Xe](=O)(F)F

Properties
Chemical formula	F_{2}O_{2}Xe
Molar mass	201.288 g·mol^{−1}
Melting point	30.8 °C (87.4 °F; 304 K)

Structure
Crystal structure	Orthorhombic
Molecular shape	Disphenoidal or seesaw [Sawhorse]
- Except where otherwise noted, data are given for materials in their standard state (at 25 °C [77 °F], 100 kPa). Infobox references

Xenon dioxydifluoride is an inorganic chemical compound with the formula XeO_{2}F_{2}. At room temperature it exists as a metastable solid, which decomposes slowly into xenon difluoride, but the cause of this decomposition is unknown.

== Preparation ==
Xenon dioxydifluoride is prepared by reacting xenon trioxide with xenon oxytetrafluoride.

XeO_{3} + XeOF_{4} → 2XeO_{2}F_{2}
