= Xenon oxytetrafluoride =

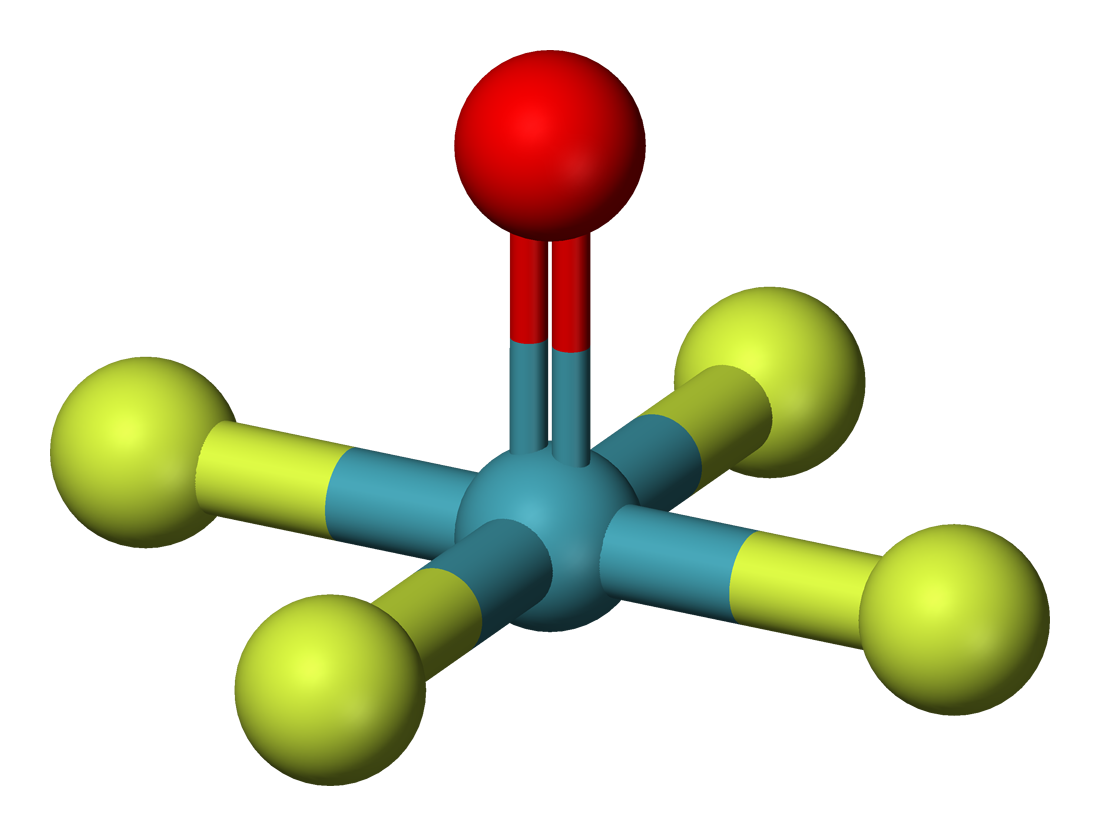
- Ball-and-stick model of xenon oxytetrafluoride

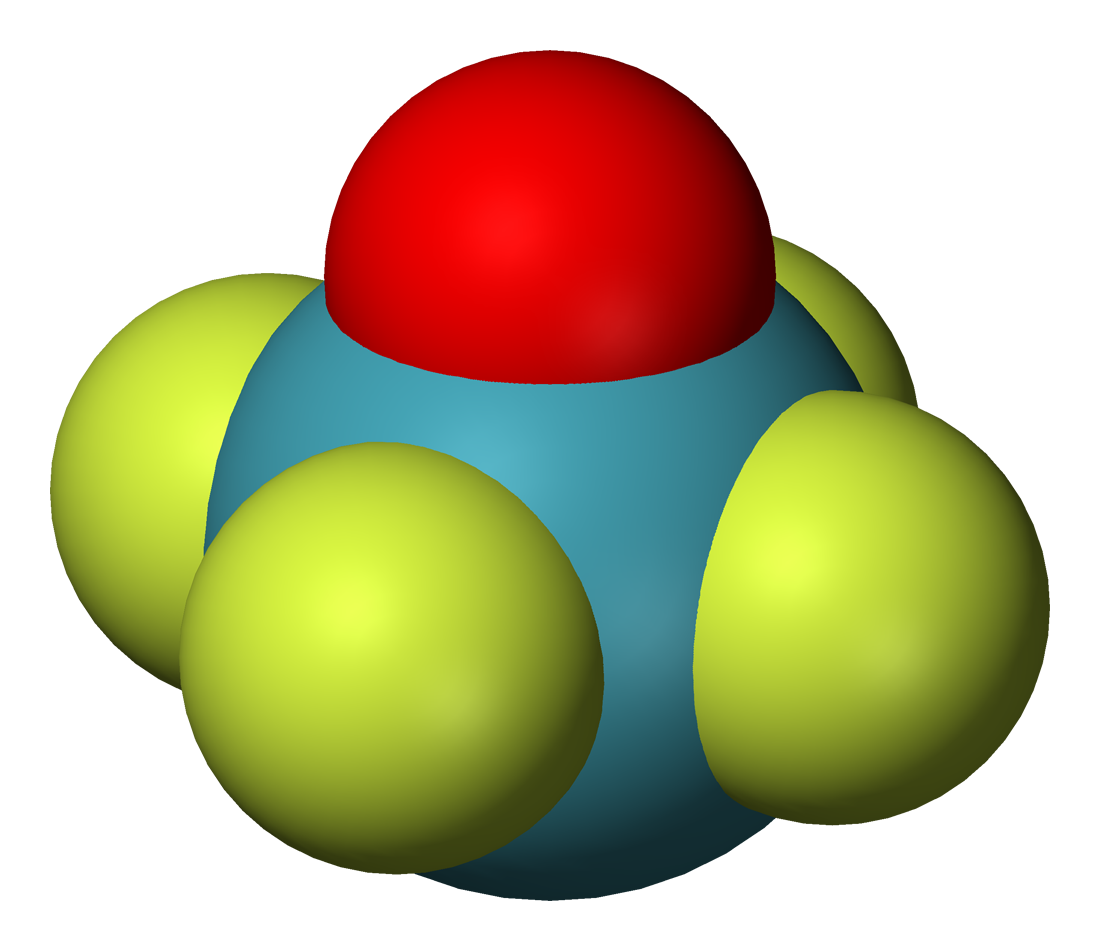
- Space-filling model of xenon oxytetrafluoride

Identifiers
CAS Number	13774-85-1
3D model (JSmol)	Interactive image
ChEBI	CHEBI:229456
ChemSpider	10326200
CompTox Dashboard (EPA)	DTXSID401027102
- InChI: InChI=1S/F4OXe/c1-6(2,3,4)5 Key: ONRYXFFHIXYZMZ-UHFFFAOYSA-N; InChI=1/F4OXe/c1-6(2,3,4)5 Key: ONRYXFFHIXYZMZ-UHFFFAOYAY
- SMILES: F[Xe](F)(F)(F)=O

Properties
Chemical formula	XeOF_{4}
Molar mass	223.23 g/mol
Appearance	colorless liquid
Density	3.17 g/cm^{3}, liquid
Melting point	−46.2 °C (−51.2 °F; 227.0 K)
Solubility in water	Reacts with water

Structure
Molecular shape	square pyramidal
- Except where otherwise noted, data are given for materials in their standard state (at 25 °C [77 °F], 100 kPa). verify (what is ?) Infobox references

Xenon oxytetrafluoride (XeOF_{4}) is an inorganic chemical compound. It is an unstable colorless liquid with a melting point of −46.2 °C (−51.2 °F; 227.0 K) that can be synthesized by partial hydrolysis of XeF_{6}, or the reaction of XeF_{6} with silica or NaNO_{3}:

NaNO_{3} + XeF_{6} → NaF + XeOF_{4} + FNO_{2}

A high-yield synthesis proceeds by the reaction of XeF_{6} with POF_{3} at −196 °C (−320.8 °F; 77.1 K).

Like most xenon oxides, it is extremely reactive, and it hydrolyses in water to give hazardous and corrosive products, including hydrogen fluoride:

2 XeOF_{4} + 4 H_{2}O → 2 Xe + 8 HF + 3 O_{2}

In addition, some ozone and fluorine is formed.

== Reactions ==
XeOF_{4} reacts with H_{2}O in the following steps:

XeOF_{4} + H_{2}O → XeO_{2}F_{2} + 2 HF
XeO_{2}F_{2} + H_{2}O → XeO_{3} + 2 HF

The XeO_{3} formed is a dangerous explosive, decomposing explosively to Xe and O_{2}:

2 XeO_{3} → 2 Xe + 3 O_{2}

In its liquid form, XeOF_{4} exhibits amphoteric behaviour, forming complexes with both strong Lewis bases like CsF and strong Lewis acids like SbF_{5}. It forms a 1:1 adduct with XeF_{2}, isostructural with XeF_{2}·IF_{5}, as well as various heavy alkali metal fluorides.

The reaction of XeOF_{4} with XeO_{3} provides a convenient synthesis route for XeO_{2}F_{2}.

== See also ==
- Xenon compounds
