= Xenon tetroxide =

Noble gas compound

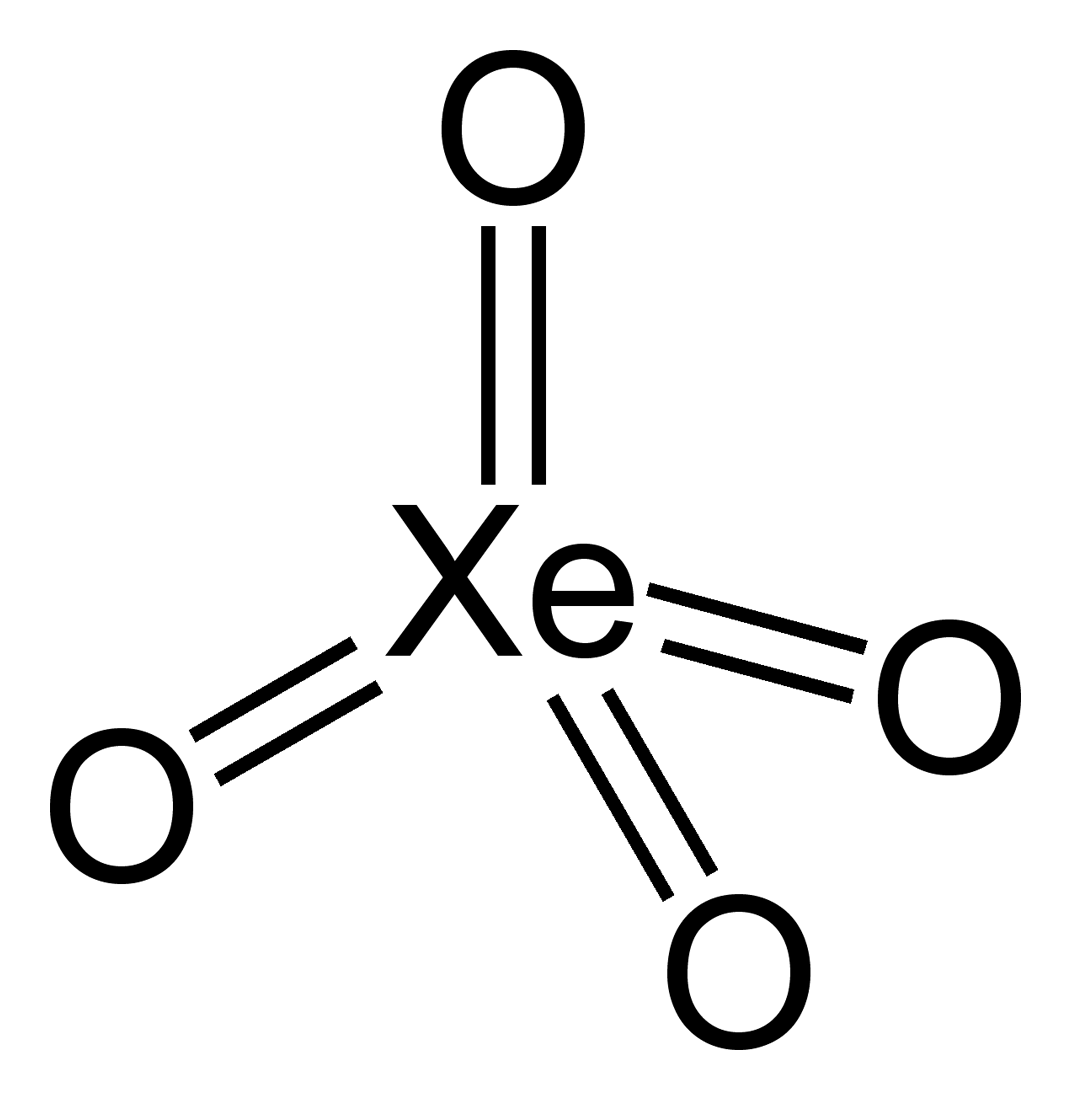
Xenon tetroxide
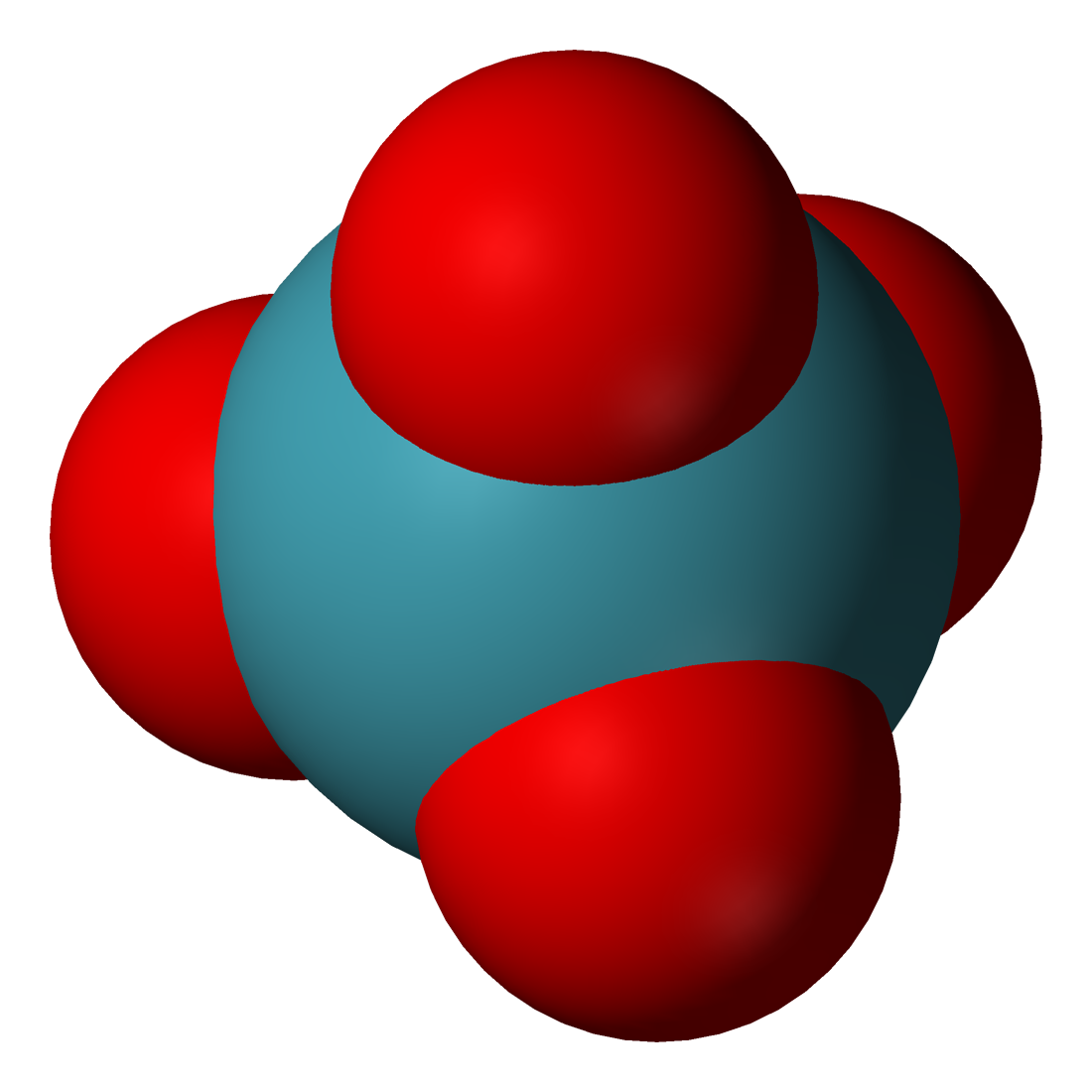
Space-filling model of the xenon tetroxide molecule

Names
- IUPAC names Xenon tetraoxide Xenon(VIII) oxide
- Other names Xenon tetroxide Perxenic anhydride

Identifiers
CAS Number	12340-14-6
3D model (JSmol)	Interactive image
ChemSpider	21106492
CompTox Dashboard (EPA)	DTXSID40893695
- InChI: InChI=1S/O4Xe/c1-5(2,3)4 Key: VHWKDFQUJRCZDZ-UHFFFAOYSA-N; InChI=1/O4Xe/c1-5(2,3)4 Key: VHWKDFQUJRCZDZ-UHFFFAOYAS
- SMILES: O=[Xe](=O)(=O)=O

Properties
Chemical formula	XeO_{4}
Molar mass	195.289 g·mol^{−1}
Appearance	Yellow solid below −36 °C (−33 °F; 237 K)
Melting point	−35.9 °C (−32.6 °F; 237.2 K)
Boiling point	0 °C (32 °F; 273 K)
Solubility in water	reacts

Structure
Molecular shape	Tetrahedral
Dipole moment	0 D

Thermochemistry
Std enthalpy of formation (Δ_{f}H^{⦵}_{298})	+153.5 kcal mol^{−1} (642.6 kJ mol^{−1})

Hazards
- Occupational safety and health (OHS/OSH)
Main hazards	powerful explosive

Related compounds
Related compounds	Perxenic acid Xenon trioxide
- Except where otherwise noted, data are given for materials in their standard state (at 25 °C [77 °F], 100 kPa). verify (what is ?) Infobox references

Xenon tetroxide is a chemical compound of xenon and oxygen with molecular formula XeO_{4}, remarkable for being a relatively stable compound of a noble gas. It is a yellow crystalline solid that is stable below −35.9 °C (237.2 K); above that temperature it is very prone to exploding and decomposing into elemental xenon and oxygen (O_{2}).

All eight valence electrons of xenon are involved in the bonds with the oxygen, and the oxidation state of the xenon atom is +8. Oxygen is the only element that can bring xenon up to its highest oxidation state; even fluorine can only give XeF_{6} (+6), though attempts to synthesize XeF_{8} (+8) are still being made.

Two other short-lived xenon compounds with an oxidation state of +8, XeO_{3}F_{2} and XeO_{2}F_{4}, are accessible by the reaction of xenon tetroxide with xenon hexafluoride. XeO_{3}F_{2} and XeO_{2}F_{4} can be detected with mass spectrometry. The perxenates are also compounds where xenon has the +8 oxidation state.

== Reactions ==
At temperatures above −35.9 °C (237.2 K; −32.6 °F), xenon tetroxide is very prone to explosion, decomposing into xenon and oxygen gases with ΔH = −643 kJ/mol:

XeO_{4} → Xe + 2 O_{2}

Xenon tetroxide dissolves in water to form perxenic acid and in alkalis to form perxenate salts:

XeO_{4} + 2 H_{2}O → H_{4}XeO_{6}
XeO_{4} + 4 NaOH → Na_{4}XeO_{6} + 2 H_{2}O

Xenon tetroxide can also react with xenon hexafluoride to give xenon oxyfluorides:

XeO_{4} + XeF_{6} → XeOF_{4} + XeO_{3}F_{2}
XeO_{4} + 2 XeF_{6} → XeO_{2}F_{4} + 2 XeOF_{4}

== Synthesis ==
All syntheses start from the perxenates, which are accessible from the xenates through two methods. One is the disproportionation of xenates to perxenates and xenon:

2 HXeO^{−}_{4} + 2 OH^{−} → XeO_{6}^{4−} + Xe + O_{2} + 2 H_{2}O

The other is oxidation of the xenates with ozone in basic solution:

HXeO_{4}^{−} + O_{3} + 3 OH^{−} → XeO_{6}^{4−} + O_{2} + 2 H_{2}O

Barium perxenate is reacted with sulfuric acid and the unstable perxenic acid is dehydrated to give xenon tetroxide:

Ba_{2}XeO_{6} + 2 H_{2}SO_{4} → 2 BaSO_{4} + H_{4}XeO_{6}
H_{4}XeO_{6} → 2 H_{2}O + XeO_{4}

Any excess perxenic acid slowly undergoes a decomposition reaction to xenic acid and oxygen:

2 H_{4}XeO_{6} → O_{2} + 2 H_{2}XeO_{4} + 2 H_{2}O
