= Perxenate =

Chemical compound

In chemistry, perxenates are salts of the yellow xenon-containing anion XeO^{4−}_{6}. This anion has octahedral molecular geometry, as determined by Raman spectroscopy, having O–Xe–O bond angles varying between 87° and 93°. The Xe–O bond length was determined by X-ray crystallography to be 1.875 Å.

== Synthesis ==
Perxenates are synthesized by the disproportionation of xenon trioxide when dissolved in strong alkali:

2 XeO_{3} (s) + 4 OH^{−} (aq) → Xe (g) + XeO^{4−}_{6} (aq) + O_{2} (g) + 2 H_{2}O (l)

When Ba(OH)_{2} is used as the alkali, barium perxenate can be crystallized from the resulting solution.

== Perxenic acid ==
Perxenic acid

Perxenic acid is the unstable conjugate acid of the perxenate anion, formed by the solution of xenon tetroxide in water. It has not been isolated as a free acid, because under acidic conditions it rapidly decomposes into xenon trioxide, water, and oxygen gas:

2 HXeO^{3−}_{6} + 6 H^{+} → 2 XeO_{3} + 4 H_{2}O + O_{2}

Its extrapolated formula, H_{4}XeO_{6}, is inferred from the octahedral geometry of the perxenate ion (XeO^{4−}_{6}) in its alkali metal salts.

The pK_{a} of aqueous perxenic acid has been indirectly calculated to be below 0, making it an extremely strong acid. Its first ionization yields the anion H_{3}XeO^{−}_{6}, which has a pK_{a} value of 4.29, still relatively acidic. The twice deprotonated species H_{2}XeO^{2−}_{6} has a pK_{a} value of 10.81. Due to its rapid decomposition under acidic conditions as described above, however, it is most commonly known as perxenate salts, bearing the anion XeO^{4−}_{6}.

== Properties ==
Perxenic acid and the anion XeO^{4−}_{6} are both strong oxidizing agents, capable of oxidising silver(I), copper (II) and manganese(II) to (respectively) silver(III), copper(III), and permanganate. The perxenate anion is unstable in acidic solutions, being almost instantaneously reduced to HXeO^{−}_{4}.

The sodium, potassium, and barium salts are soluble. Barium perxenate solution is used as the starting material for the synthesis of xenon tetroxide (XeO_{4}) by mixing it with concentrated sulfuric acid:

Ba_{2}XeO_{6} (s) + 2 H_{2}SO_{4} (l) → XeO_{4} (g) + 2 BaSO_{4} (s) + 2 H_{2}O (l)

Most metal perxenates are stable, except silver perxenate, which decomposes violently.

== Applications ==
Sodium perxenate, Na_{4}XeO_{6}, can be used for the analytic separation of trace amounts of americium from curium. The separation involves the oxidation of Am^{3+} to Am^{4+} by sodium perxenate in acidic solution in the presence of La^{3+}, followed by treatment with calcium fluoride, which forms insoluble fluorides with Cm^{3+} and La^{3+}, but retains Am^{4+} and Pu^{4+} in solution as soluble fluorides.
