= Xenon trioxide =

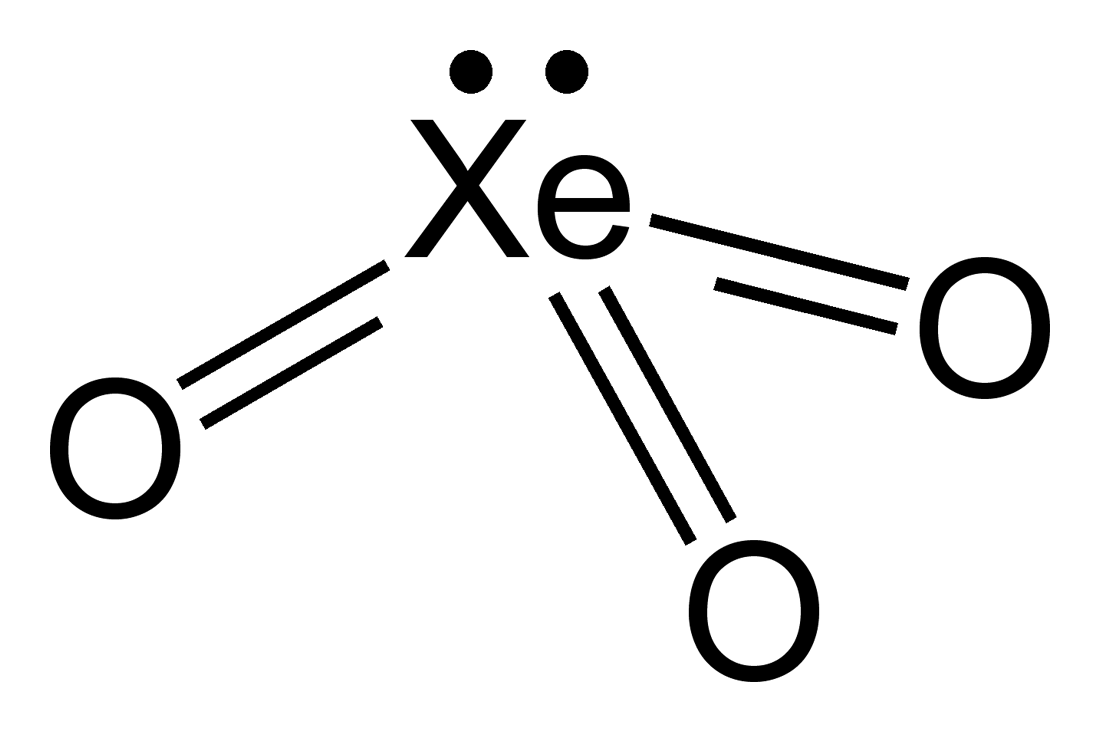
- Structural formula, showing lone pair

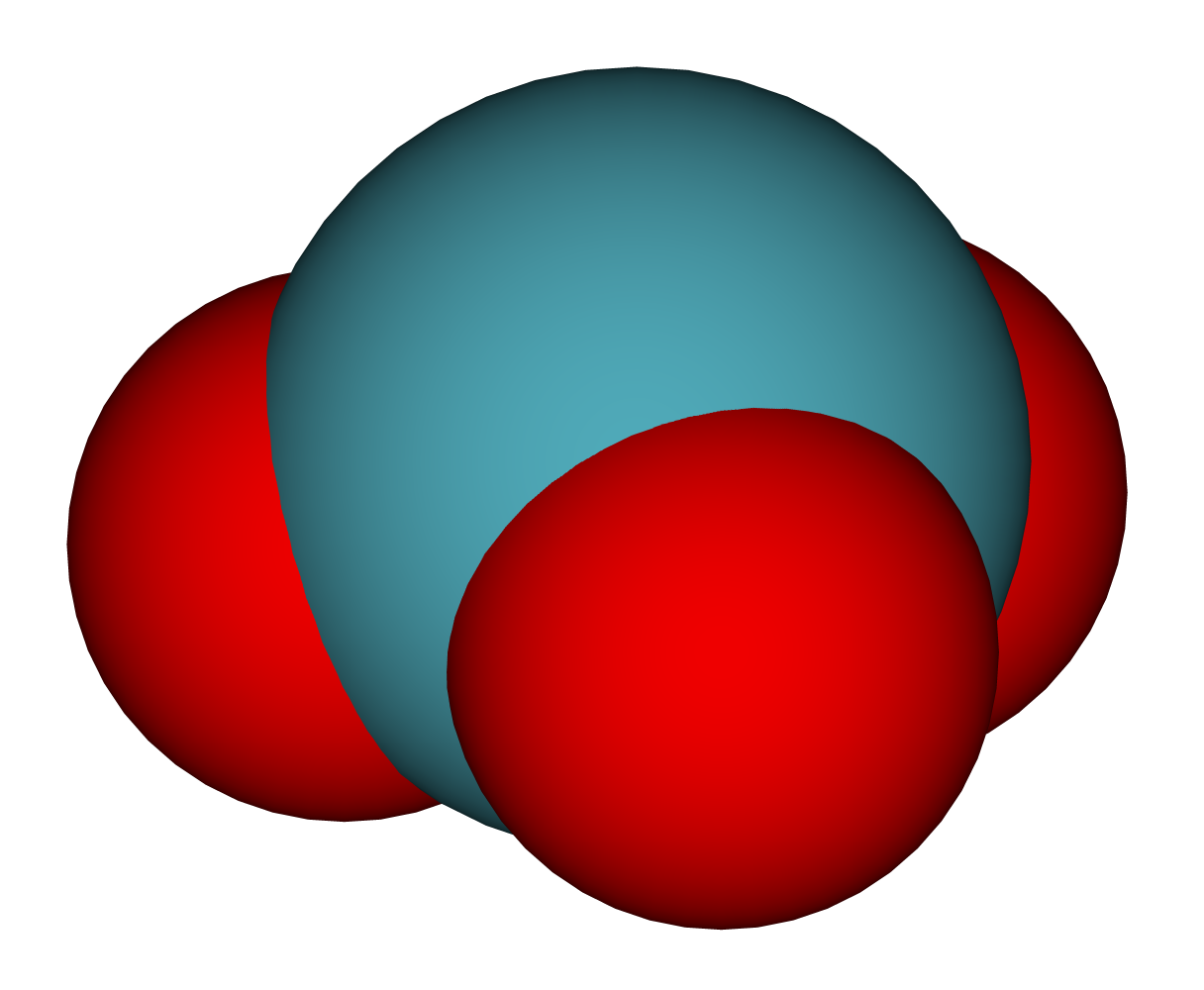
- Space-filling model

Names
- IUPAC names Xenon trioxide Xenon(VI) oxide
- Other names Xenic anhydride

Identifiers
CAS Number	13776-58-4
3D model (JSmol)	Interactive image
ChemSpider	21106493
UNII	IM8XMX5O5Q
CompTox Dashboard (EPA)	DTXSID80894909
- InChI: InChI=1S/O3Xe/c1-4(2)3 Key: ZWAWYSBJNBVQHP-UHFFFAOYSA-N; InChI=1/O3Xe/c1-4(2)3 Key: ZWAWYSBJNBVQHP-UHFFFAOYAR
- SMILES: O=Xe(=O)=O

Properties
Chemical formula	XeO_{3}
Molar mass	179.288 g/mol
Appearance	colourless crystalline solid
Density	4.55 g/cm^{3}, solid
Melting point	25 °C (77 °F; 298 K) Violent decomposition
Solubility in water	Soluble (with reaction)

Structure
Molecular shape	trigonal pyramidal (C_{3v})

Thermochemistry
Std enthalpy of formation (Δ_{f}H^{⦵}_{298})	402 kJ·mol^{−1}

Hazards
NFPA 704 (fire diamond)	4 0 4 OX

Related compounds
Related compounds	Xenon tetroxide Xenic acid
- Except where otherwise noted, data are given for materials in their standard state (at 25 °C [77 °F], 100 kPa). verify (what is ?) Infobox references

Xenon trioxide is an unstable compound of xenon in its +6 oxidation state. It is a very powerful oxidizing agent, and liberates oxygen from water slowly, accelerated by exposure to sunlight. It is dangerously explosive upon contact with organic materials. When it detonates, it releases xenon and oxygen gas.

== Chemistry ==
Synthesis of xenon trioxide is by aqueous hydrolysis of XeF_{6}:

XeF_{6} + 3 H_{2}O → XeO_{3} + 6 HF

The resulting xenon trioxide crystals are a strong oxidising agent and can oxidise most substances that are at all oxidisable. However, it is slow-acting and this reduces its usefulness.

Above 25 °C, xenon trioxide is very prone to violent explosion:

2 XeO_{3} → 2 Xe + 3 O_{2} (ΔH_{f} = −403 kJ/mol)

When it dissolves in water, an acidic solution of xenic acid is formed:

XeO_{3}(aq) + H_{2}O → H_{2}XeO_{4} ⇌ H^{+} + HXeO^{−}_{4}

This solution is stable at room temperature and lacks the explosive properties of xenon trioxide. It oxidises carboxylic acids quantitatively to carbon dioxide and water.

Alternatively, 15-crown-5 coordinates to xenon trioxide to give a complex stable at room-temperature against mechanical shock.

Alternatively, it dissolves in alkaline solutions to form xenates. The HXeO^{−}_{4} anion is the predominant species in xenate solutions. These are not stable and begin to disproportionate into perxenates (+8 oxidation state) and xenon and oxygen gas. Solid perxenates containing XeO^{4−}_{6} have been isolated by reacting XeO_{3} with an aqueous solution of hydroxides. Xenon trioxide reacts with inorganic fluorides such as KF, RbF, or CsF to form stable solids of the form MXeO_{3}F.

== Physical properties ==
Hydrolysis of xenon hexafluoride or xenon tetrafluoride yields a solution from which colorless XeO_{3} crystals can be obtained by evaporation. The crystals are stable for days in dry air, but readily absorb water from humid air to form a concentrated solution. The crystal structure is orthorhombic with a = 6.163 Å, b = 8.115 Å, c = 5.234 Å, and 4 molecules per unit cell. The density is 4.55 g/cm^{3}.

ball-and-stick model of part of the crystal structure of XeO_{3}	space-filling model	coordination geometry of XeO_{3}

== Safety ==
XeO_{3} should be handled with great caution. Samples have detonated when undisturbed at room temperature. Dry crystals react explosively with cellulose.
