= Hexafluoride =

A hexafluoride is a chemical compound with the general formula QX_{n}F_{6}, QX_{n}F_{6}^{m−}, or QX_{n}F_{6}^{m+}. Many molecules fit this formula. An important hexafluoride is hexafluorosilicic acid (H_{2}SiF_{6}), which is a byproduct of the mining of phosphate rock. In the nuclear industry, uranium hexafluoride (UF_{6}) is an important intermediate in the purification of this element.

== Hexafluoride cations ==
Cationic hexafluorides exist but are rarer than neutral or anionic hexafluorides. Examples are the hexafluorochlorine (ClF_{6}^{+}), and hexafluorobromine (BrF_{6}^{+}) cations.

== Hexafluoride anions ==
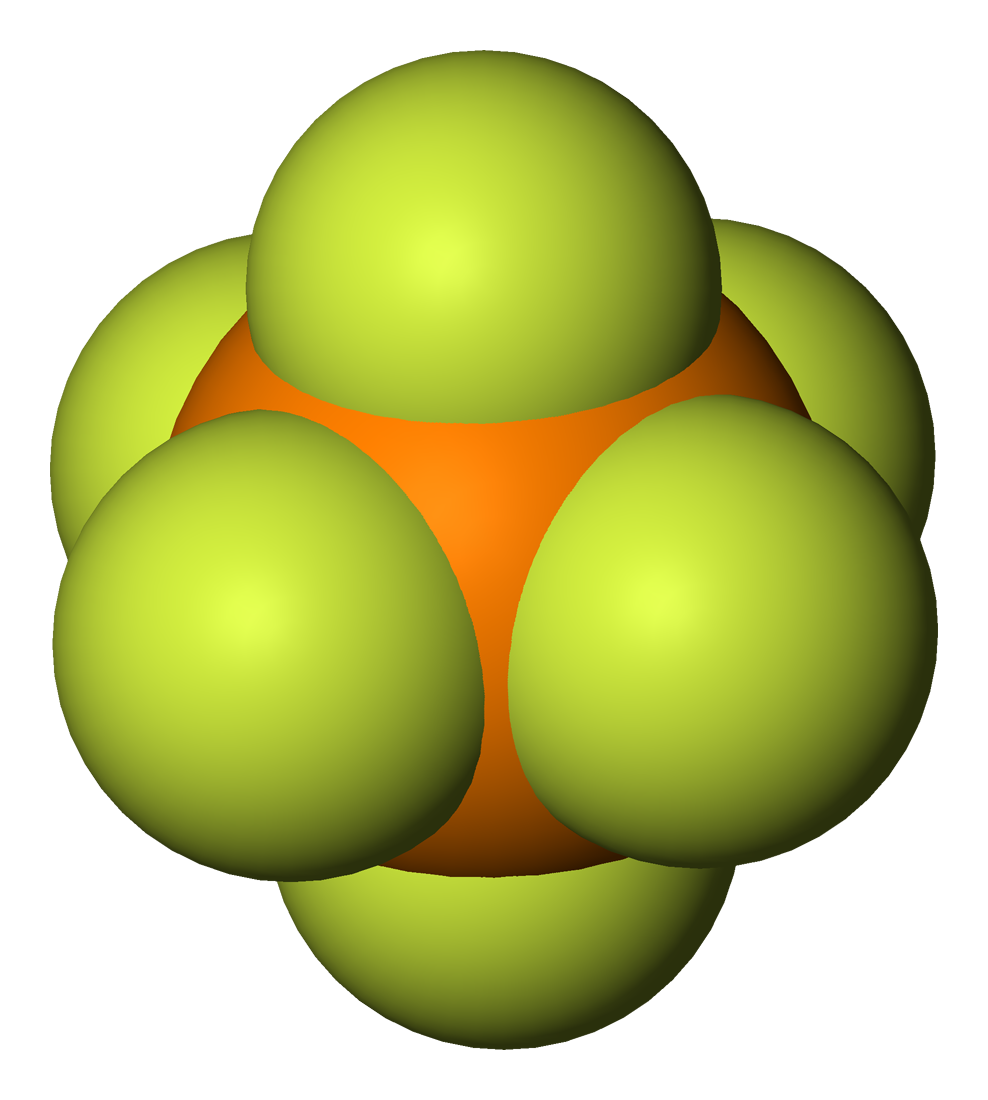
Structure of the hexafluorophosphate anion, PF_{6}^{−}.

Many elements form anionic hexafluorides. Members of commercial interest are hexafluorophosphate (PF_{6}^{−}) and hexafluorosilicate (SiF_{6}^{2−}).

Many transition metals form hexafluoride anions. Often the monoanions are generated by reduction of the neutral hexafluorides. For example, PtF_{6}^{−} arises by reduction of PtF_{6} by O_{2}. Because of its highly basic nature and its resistance to oxidation, the fluoride ligand stabilizes some metals in otherwise rare high oxidation states, such as hexafluorocuprate(IV), CuF^{2−}_{6} and hexafluoronickelate(IV), NiF^{2−}_{6}.

== Binary hexafluorides ==
Hexafluoride-forming elements

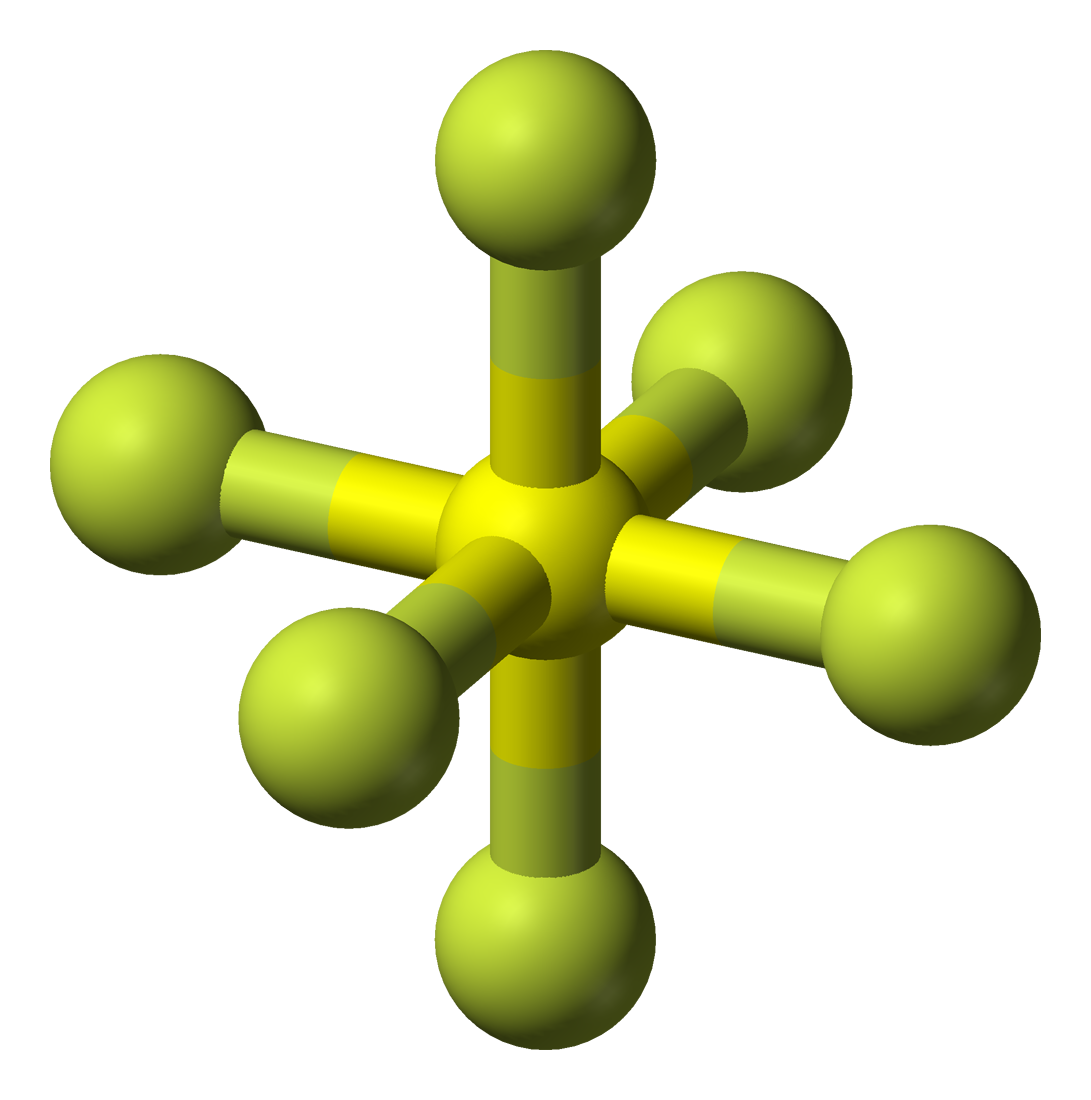
Octahedral structure of SF_{6}

Seventeen elements are known to form binary hexafluorides. Nine of these elements are transition metals, three are actinides, four are chalcogens, and one is a noble gas. Most hexafluorides are molecular compounds with low melting and boiling points. Four hexafluorides (S, Se, Te, and W) are gases at room temperature (25 °C) and a pressure of 1 atm, two are liquids (Re, Mo), and the others are volatile solids. The group 6, chalcogen, and noble gas hexafluorides are colourless, but the other hexafluorides have colours ranging from white, through yellow, orange, red, brown, and grey, to black.

The molecular geometry of binary hexafluorides is generally octahedral, although some derivatives are distorted from O_{h} symmetry. For the main group hexafluorides, distortion is pronounced for the 14-electron noble gas derivatives. Distortions in gaseous XeF_{6} are caused by its non-bonding lone pair, according to VSEPR theory. In the solid state, it adopts a complex structure involving tetramers and hexamers. According to quantum chemical calculations, ReF_{6} and RuF_{6} should have tetragonally distorted structures (where the two bonds along one axis are longer or shorter than the other four), but this has not been verified experimentally.

Polonium hexafluoride is known, but not well-studied. It could not be made from ^{210}Po, but using the longer-lived isotope ^{208}Po and reacting it with fluorine found a volatile product that is almost certainly PoF_{6}. The quoted boiling point in the table below is a prediction.

=== Binary hexafluorides of the chalcogens ===
| Compound | Formula | m.p (°C) | b.p. (°C) | subl.p. (°C) | MW | solid ρ (g cm^{−3}) (at m.p.) | Bond distance (pm) | Colour |
|---|---|---|---|---|---|---|---|---|
| Sulfur hexafluoride | SF_{6} | −50.8 | | −63.8 | 146.06 | 2.51 (−50 °C) | 156.4 | colourless |
| Selenium hexafluoride | SeF_{6} | −34.6 | | −46.6 | 192.95 | 3.27 | 167–170 | colourless |
| Tellurium hexafluoride | TeF_{6} | −38.9 | −37.6 | | 241.59 | 3.76 | 184 | colourless |
| Polonium hexafluoride | PoF_{6} | | ≈ −40? | | 322.99 | | | colourless |

=== Binary hexafluorides of the noble gases ===
| Compound | Formula | m.p (°C) | b.p. (°C) | subl.p. (°C) | MW | solid ρ (g cm^{−3}) | Bond (pm) | Colour |
|---|---|---|---|---|---|---|---|---|
| Xenon hexafluoride | XeF_{6} | 49.5 | 75.6 | | 245.28 | 3.56 | | colourless (solid) yellow (gas) |

=== Binary hexafluorides of the transition metals ===
| Compound | Formula | m.p (°C) | b.p. (°C) | subl.p. (°C) | MW | solid ρ (g cm^{−3}) | Bond (pm) | Colour |
|---|---|---|---|---|---|---|---|---|
| Molybdenum hexafluoride | MoF_{6} | 17.5 | 34.0 | | 209.94 | 3.50 (−140 °C) | 181.7 | colourless |
| Technetium hexafluoride | TcF_{6} | 37.4 | 55.3 | | (212) | 3.58 (−140 °C) | 181.2 | yellow |
| Ruthenium hexafluoride | RuF_{6} | 54 | | | 215.07 | 3.68 (−140 °C) | 181.8 | dark brown |
| Rhodium hexafluoride | RhF_{6} | ≈ 70 | | | 216.91 | 3.71 (−140 °C) | 182.4 | black |
| Tungsten hexafluoride | WF_{6} | 2.3 | 17.1 | | 297.85 | 4.86 (−140 °C) | 182.6 | colourless |
| Rhenium hexafluoride | ReF_{6} | 18.5 | 33.7 | | 300.20 | 4.94 (−140 °C) | 182.3 | yellow |
| Osmium hexafluoride | OsF_{6} | 33.4 | 47.5 | | 304.22 | 5.09 (−140 °C) | 182.9 | yellow |
| Iridium hexafluoride | IrF_{6} | 44 | 53.6 | | 306.21 | 5.11 (−140 °C) | 183.4 | yellow |
| Platinum hexafluoride | PtF_{6} | 61.3 | 69.1 | | 309.07 | 5.21 (−140 °C) | 184.8 | deep red |

=== Binary hexafluorides of the actinides ===
| Compound | Formula | m.p (°C) | b.p. (°C) | subl.p. (°C) | MW | solid ρ (g cm^{−3}) | Bond (pm) | Colour |
|---|---|---|---|---|---|---|---|---|
| Uranium hexafluoride | UF_{6} | 64.052 | | 56.5 | 351.99 | 5.09 | 199.6 | colorless |
| Neptunium hexafluoride | NpF_{6} | 54.4 | 55.18 | | (351) | | 198.1 | orange |
| Plutonium hexafluoride | PuF_{6} | 52 | 62 | | (358) | 5.08 | 197.1 | brown |

=== Chemical properties of binary hexafluorides ===
The hexafluorides have a wide range of chemical reactivity. Sulfur hexafluoride is nearly inert and non-toxic due to steric hindrance (the six fluorine atoms are arranged so tightly around the sulfur atom that it is extremely difficult to attack the bonds between the fluorine and sulfur atoms). It has several applications due to its stability, dielectric properties, and high density. Selenium hexafluoride is nearly as unreactive as SF_{6}, but tellurium hexafluoride is not very stable and can be hydrolyzed by water within 1 day. Also, both selenium hexafluoride and tellurium hexafluoride are toxic, while sulfur hexafluoride is non-toxic. In contrast, metal hexafluorides are corrosive, readily hydrolyzed, and may react violently with water. Some of them can be used as fluorinating agents. The metal hexafluorides have a high electron affinity, which makes them strong oxidizing agents. Platinum hexafluoride in particular is notable for its ability to oxidize the dioxygen molecule, O_{2}, to form dioxygenyl hexafluoroplatinate, and for being the first compound that was observed to react with xenon (see xenon hexafluoroplatinate).

=== Applications of binary hexafluorides ===
Some metal hexafluorides find applications due to their volatility. Uranium hexafluoride is used in the uranium enrichment process to produce fuel for nuclear reactors. Fluoride volatility can also be exploited for nuclear fuel reprocessing. Tungsten hexafluoride is used in the production of semiconductors through the process of chemical vapor deposition.

=== Predicted binary hexafluorides ===
==== Radon hexafluoride ====
Radon hexafluoride (RnF_{6}), the heavier homologue of xenon hexafluoride, has been studied theoretically, but its synthesis has not yet been confirmed. Higher fluorides of radon may have been observed in experiments where unknown radon-containing products distilled together with xenon hexafluoride, and perhaps in the production of radon trioxide: these may have been RnF_{4}, RnF_{6}, or both. It is likely that the difficulty in identifying higher fluorides of radon stems from radon being kinetically hindered from being oxidised beyond the divalent state. This is due to the strong ionicity of RnF_{2} and the high positive charge on Rn in RnF^{+}. Spatial separation of RnF_{2} molecules may be necessary to clearly identify higher fluorides of radon, of which RnF_{4} is expected to be more stable than RnF_{6} due to spin–orbit splitting of the 6p shell of radon (Rn^{IV} would have a closed-shell 6s^{2}6p^{2}_{1/2} configuration). The ionicity of the Rn–F bond may also result in a strongly fluorine-bridged structure in the solid, so that radon fluorides may not be volatile. Continuing the trend, the heavier oganesson hexafluoride should be unbound.

==== Others ====
Krypton hexafluoride (KrF_{6}) has been predicted to be stable, but has not been synthesised due to the extreme difficulty of oxidising krypton beyond Kr(II). The synthesis of americium hexafluoride (AmF_{6}) by the fluorination of americium(IV) fluoride (AmF_{4}) was attempted in 1990, but was unsuccessful; there have also been possible thermochromatographic identifications of it and curium hexafluoride (CmF_{6}), but it is debated if these are conclusive. Palladium hexafluoride (PdF_{6}), the lighter homologue of platinum hexafluoride, has been calculated to be stable, but has not yet been produced; the possibility of silver (AgF_{6}) and gold hexafluorides (AuF_{6}) has also been discussed. Chromium hexafluoride (CrF_{6}), the lighter homologue of molybdenum hexafluoride and tungsten hexafluoride, was reported, but has been shown to be a mistaken identification of the known pentafluoride (CrF_{5}). CrF_{6}, MnF_{6}, and FeF_{6} are predicted to exist at 300 GPa.

Radium hexafluoride (RaF_{6}), with radium in an unusual +6 oxidation state, is predicted to exist at a pressure of 111 GPa.

== Literature ==
- Galkin, N. P.; Tumanov, Yu. N. (1971). "Reactivity and Thermal Stability of Hexafluorides". Russian Chemical Reviews. 40 (2): 154–164. Bibcode:1971RuCRv..40..154G. doi:10.1070/RC1971v040n02ABEH001902. S2CID 250901336. Archived from the original on 2015-11-30.

== Sources ==
- Wiberg, Egon; Wiberg, Nils; Holleman, Arnold Frederick (2001). Inorganic chemistry. Academic Press. ISBN 978-0-12-352651-9.
