= Oxygen compounds =

Different oxidation states of Oxygen

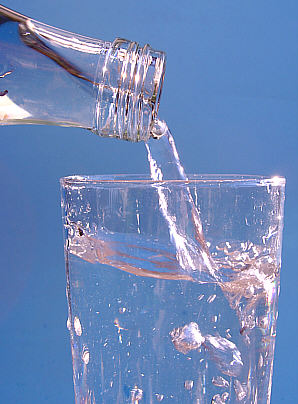
Water (H_{2}O) is the most familiar oxygen compound

The oxidation state of oxygen is −2 in almost all known compounds of oxygen. The oxidation state −1 is found in a few compounds such as peroxides. Compounds containing oxygen in other oxidation states are very uncommon: −1/2 (superoxides), −1/3 (ozonides), 0 (elemental, hypofluorous acid), +1/2 (dioxygenyl), +1 (dioxygen difluoride), and +2 (oxygen difluoride).

Oxygen is reactive and will form oxides with all other elements except the noble gases helium, neon, argon and krypton.

== Oxides ==
Water (H_{2}O) is the oxide of hydrogen and most familiar oxygen compound. Its bulk properties partly result from the interaction of its component atoms, oxygen and hydrogen, with atoms of nearby water molecules. Hydrogen atoms are covalently bonded to oxygen in a water molecule but also have an additional attraction (about 23.3 kJ·mol^{−1} per hydrogen atom) to an adjacent oxygen atom in a separate molecule. These hydrogen bonds between water molecules hold them approximately 15% closer than what would be expected in a simple liquid with just Van der Waals forces.

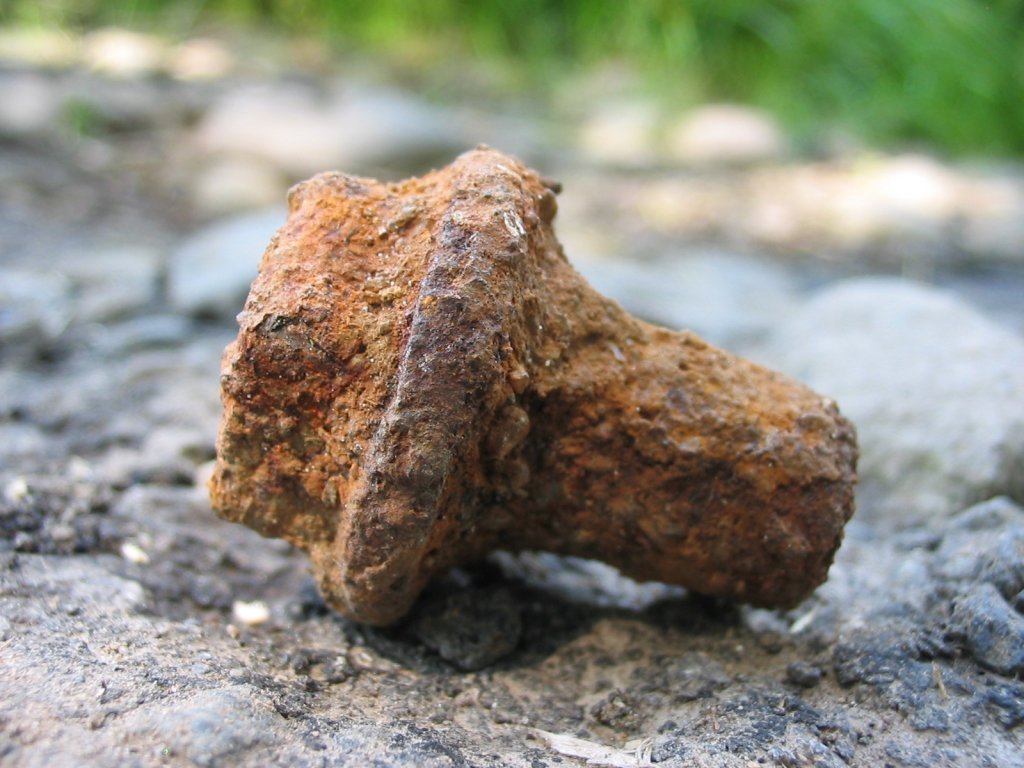
Oxides, such as iron oxide or rust, Fe_{2}O_{3}, form when oxygen combines with other elements

Due to its electronegativity, oxygen forms chemical bonds with almost all other free elements at elevated temperatures to give corresponding oxides. However, some elements, such as iron which oxidises to iron oxide, or rust, Fe_{2}O_{3}, readily oxidise at standard conditions for temperature and pressure (STP). The surface of metals like aluminium and titanium are oxidized in the presence of air and become coated with a thin film of oxide that passivates the metal and slows further corrosion. So-called noble metals, such as gold and platinum, resist direct chemical combination with oxygen, and substances like gold(III) oxide (Au_{2}O_{3}) must be formed by an indirect route.

The alkali metals and alkali earth metals all react spontaneously with oxygen when exposed to dry air to form oxides, and form hydroxides in the presence of oxygen and water. As a result, none of these elements is found in nature as a free metal. Caesium is so reactive with oxygen that it is used as a getter in vacuum tubes. Although solid magnesium reacts slowly with oxygen at STP, it is capable of burning in air, generating very high temperatures, and its metal powder may form explosive mixtures with air.

Oxygen is present as compounds in the atmosphere in trace quantities in the form of carbon dioxide (CO_{2}) and oxides of nitrogen (NO_{x}). The Earth's crustal rock is composed in large part of oxides of silicon (silica SiO_{2}, found in granite and sand), aluminium (aluminium oxide Al_{2}O_{3}, in bauxite and corundum), iron (iron(III) oxide Fe_{2}O_{3}, in hematite and rust) and other oxides of metals.

== Other inorganic compounds ==
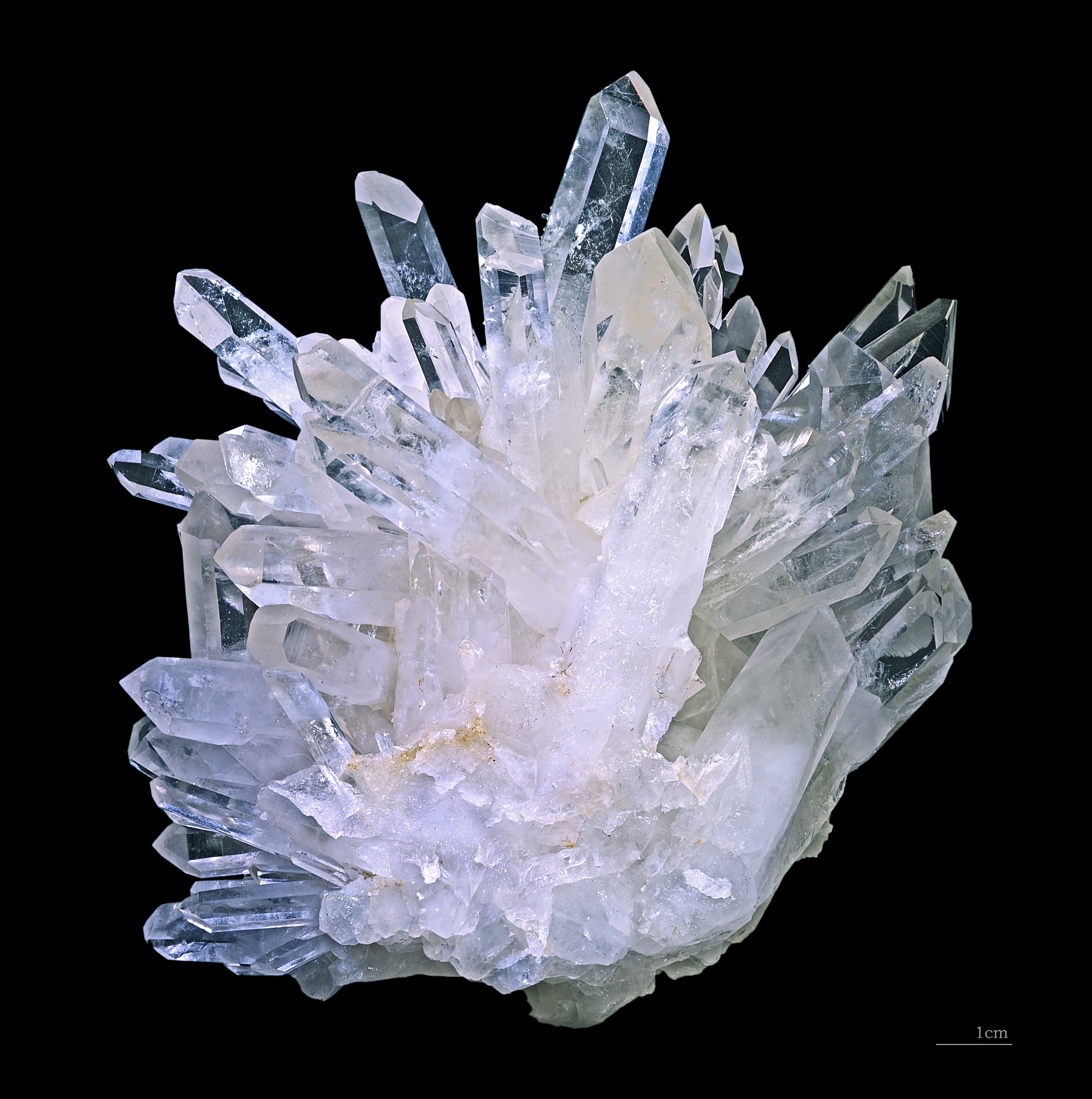
Quartz is a common crystalline mineral made of silica, or silicon dioxide (SiO_{2})

The rest of the Earth's crust is formed also of oxygen compounds, most importantly calcium carbonate (in limestone) and silicates (in feldspars). Water-soluble silicates in the form of Na_{4}SiO_{4}, Na_{2}SiO_{3}, and Na_{2}Si_{2}O_{5} are used as detergents and adhesives.

Peroxides retain some of oxygen's original molecular structure (^{−}O−O^{−}). White or light yellow sodium peroxide (Na_{2}O_{2}) is formed when metallic sodium is burned in oxygen. Each oxygen atom in its peroxide ion may have a full octet of 4 pairs of electrons. Superoxides are a class of compounds that are very similar to peroxides, but with just one unpaired electron for each pair of oxygen atoms (O^{−}_{2}). These compounds form by oxidation of alkali metals with larger ionic radii (K, Rb, Cs). For example, potassium superoxide (KO_{2}) is an orange-yellow solid formed when potassium reacts with oxygen.

Hydrogen peroxide (H_{2}O_{2}) can be produced by passing a volume of 96% to 98% hydrogen and 2 to 4% oxygen through an electric discharge. A more commercially-viable method is to allow autoxidation of an organic intermediate, 2-ethylanthrahydroquinone dissolved in an organic solvent, to oxidize to H_{2}O_{2} and 2-ethylanthraquinone. The 2-ethylanthraquinone is then reduced and recycled back into the process.

When dissolved in water, many metallic oxide form alkaline solutions, while many oxides of nonmetals form acidic solutions. For example, sodium oxide in solution forms the strong base sodium hydroxide, while phosphorus pentoxide in solution forms phosphoric acid.

Oxygenated anions such as chlorates (ClO^{−}_{3}), perchlorates (ClO^{−}_{4}), chromates (CrO^{2−}_{4}), dichromates (Cr_{2}O^{2−}_{7}), permanganates (MnO^{−}_{4}), and nitrates (NO^{−}_{3}) are strong oxidizing agents. Oxygen forms heteropoly acids and polyoxometalate ions with tungsten, molybdenum and some other transition metals, such as phosphotungstic acid (H_{3}PW_{12}O_{40}) and octadecamolybdophosphoric acid (H_{6}P_{2}Mo_{18}O_{62}).

Oxygen can form oxides with heavier noble gases xenon and radon, although this needs indirect methods. Even though no oxides of krypton are known, oxygen is able to form covalent bonds with krypton in an unstable compound Kr(OTeF_{5})_{2}.

One unexpected oxygen compound is dioxygenyl hexafluoroplatinate, O^{+}_{2}PtF^{−}_{6}, discovered in studying the properties of platinum hexafluoride (PtF_{6}). A change in color when this compound was exposed to atmospheric air suggested that dioxygen was being oxidized (in turn the difficulty of oxidizing oxygen led to the hypothesis that xenon might be oxidized by PtF_{6}, resulting in discovery of the first xenon compound xenon hexafluoroplatinate Xe^{+}PtF^{−}_{6}). The cations of oxygen are formed only in the presence of stronger oxidants than oxygen, which limits them to the action of fluorine and certain fluorine compounds. Simple oxygen fluorides are known.

== Organic compounds ==
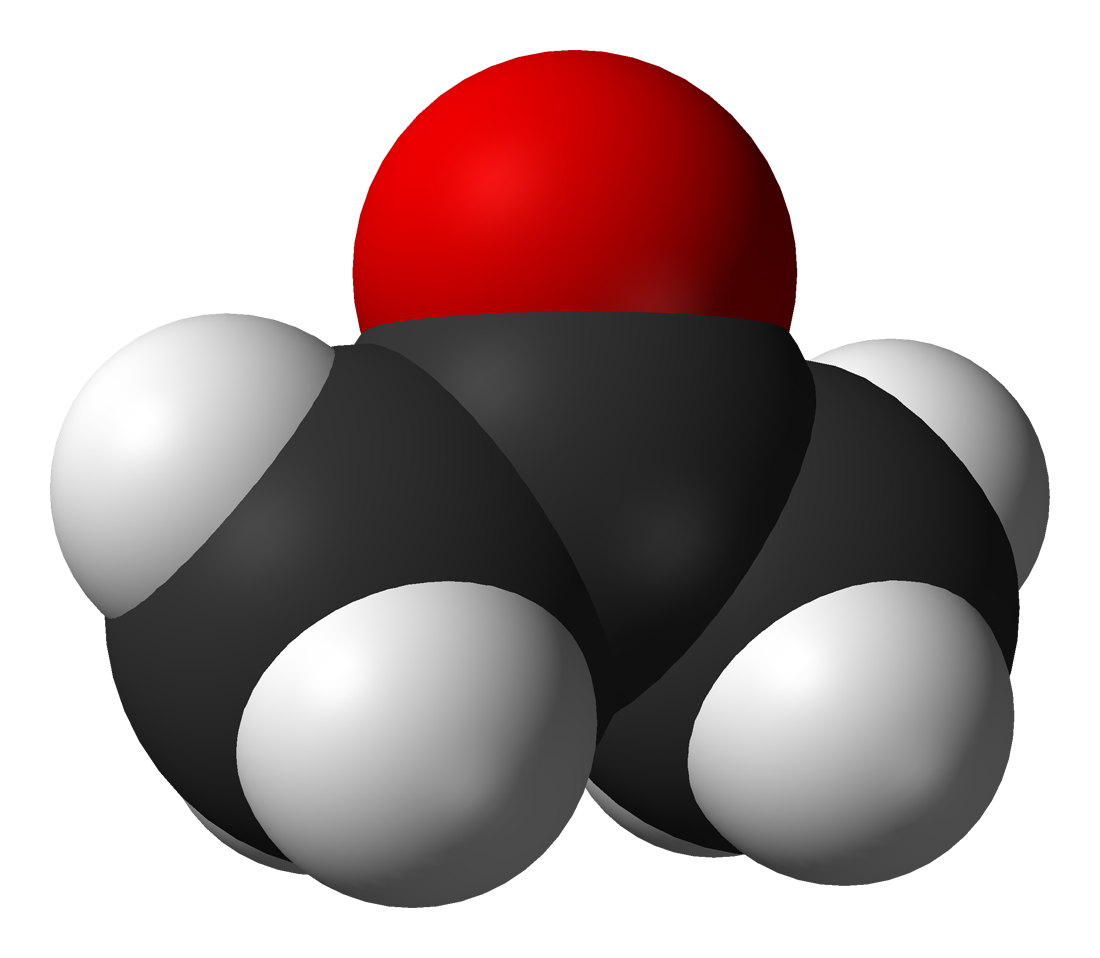
Acetone is an important feeder material in the chemical industry. (oxygen is in red, carbon in black and hydrogen in white)

Among the most important classes of organic compounds that contain oxygen are (where "R" is an organic group): alcohol (R−OH); ethers (R−O−R); ketones (R−CO−R); aldehydes (R−CO−H); carboxylic acids (R−CO−OH); esters (R−CO−O−R); acid anhydrides (R−CO−O−CO−R); amides (R−CO−NR_{2}). There are many important organic solvents that contain oxygen, among which: acetone, methanol, ethanol, isopropanol, furan, THF, diethyl ether, dioxane, ethylacetate, DMF, DMSO, acetic acid, formic acid. Acetone ((CH_{3})_{2}CO) and phenol (C_{6}H_{5}OH) are used as feeder materials in the synthesis of many different substances. Other important organic compounds that contain oxygen are: glycerol, formaldehyde, glutaraldehyde, citric acid, acetic anhydride, acetamide, etc. Epoxides are ethers in which the oxygen atom is part of a ring of three atoms.

Oxygen reacts spontaneously with many organic compounds at or below room temperature in a process called autoxidation. Alkaline solutions of pyrogallol (benzene-1,2,3-triol) absorb oxygen from the air, and are used in the determination of the atmospheric concentration of oxygen. Most of the organic compounds that contain oxygen are not made by direct action of oxygen. Organic compounds important in industry and commerce are made by direct oxidation of a precursor include:

- Ethylene oxide (used to make the antifreeze ethylene glycol) is obtained by direct oxidation of ethylene:

C_{2}H_{4} + 1/2 O_{2} + C_{2}H_{4}O

- Peracetic acid (feeder material for various epoxy compounds) is obtained from acetaldehyde:

CH_{3}CHO + O_{2} + CH_{3}CO−OOH

== Biomolecules ==
Oxygen represents more than 40% of the molecular weight of the ATP molecule

The element is found in almost all biomolecules that are important to, or generated by, life. Only a few common complex biomolecules, such as squalene and the carotenes, contain no oxygen. Of the organic compounds with biological relevance, carbohydrates contain the largest proportion by mass of oxygen (about 50%). All fats, fatty acids, amino acids, and proteins contain oxygen (due to the presence of carbonyl groups in these acids and their ester residues). Furthermore, seven of the amino acids which are incorporated into proteins, have oxygen incorporated into their side-chains, as well. Oxygen also occurs in phosphate (PO^{3−}_{4}) groups in the biologically important energy-carrying molecules ATP and ADP, in the backbone and the purines (except adenine) and pyrimidines of RNA and DNA, and in bones as calcium phosphate and hydroxylapatite.

== See also ==
- Oxygen
- Allotropes of oxygen
- Reactive oxygen species
