= Potassium nickel fluoride =

Potassium nickel fluoride may refer to any of the following complex salts:

- Potassium tetrafluoronickelate, K_{2}NiF_{4}
- Potassium hexafluoronickelate, K_{2}NiF_{6}
