= Xenon hexafluororhodate =

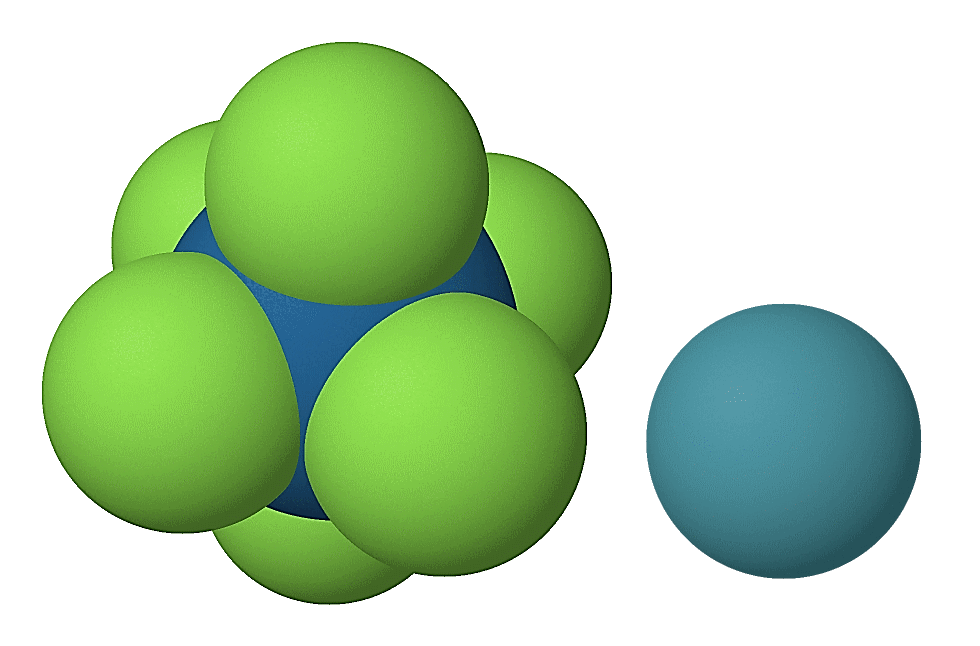

Identifiers
CAS Number	none
3D model (JSmol)	Interactive image
- InChI: InChI=1S/FXe.5FH.Rh/c1-2;;;;;;/h;5*1H;/q+1;;;;;;+4/p-5 Key: NFSSTTHKJSXWRM-UHFFFAOYSA-I
- SMILES: F[Xe+].F[Rh-1](F)(F)(F)F

Properties
Chemical formula	XeRhF_{6}
Molar mass	348.1855 g/mol
- Except where otherwise noted, data are given for materials in their standard state (at 25 °C [77 °F], 100 kPa). Infobox references

Xenon hexafluororhodate (XeRhF_{6}) is a deep-red noble gas compound first synthesised in 1963 by Neil Bartlett. It is analogous to xenon hexafluoroplatinate.

== Synthesis ==
Xenon hexafluororhodate is produced by the direct combination of xenon and rhodium hexafluoride:

Xe + RhF_{6} → XeRhF_{6}
