= Dioxygenyl =

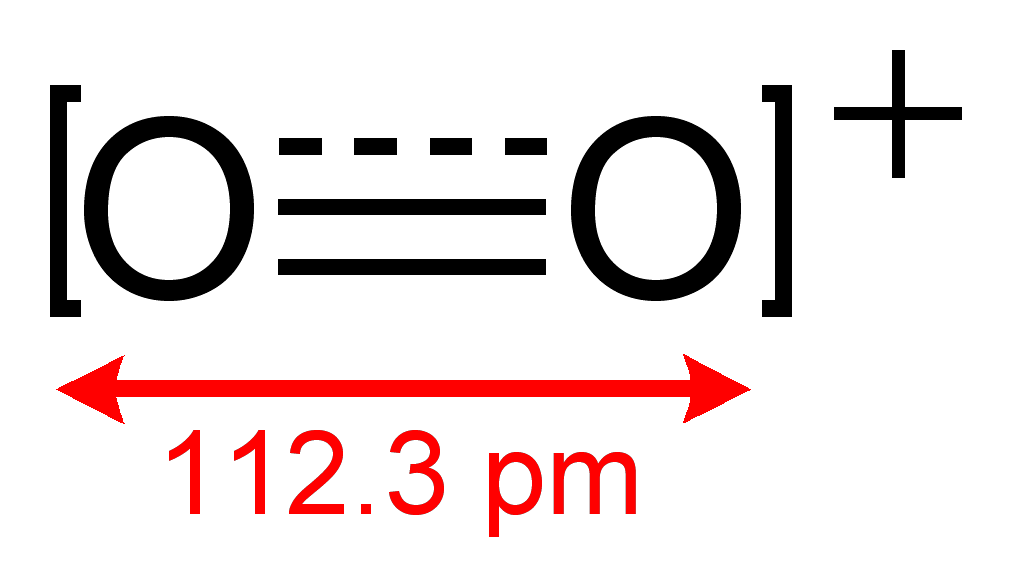

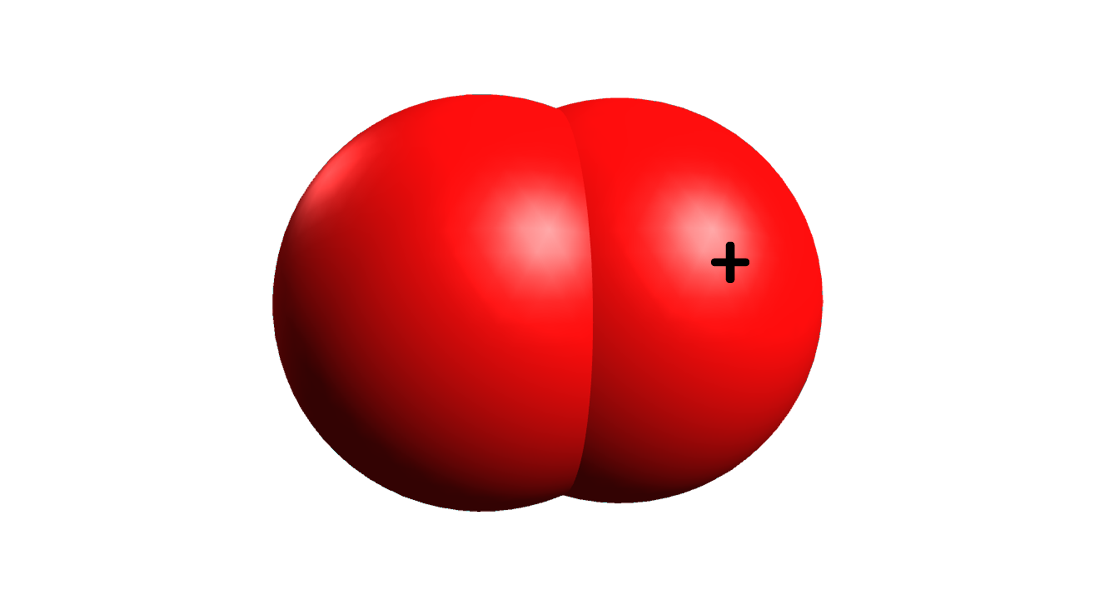

Names
- IUPAC name Dioxidanyliumyl, Dioxygen(•1+)
- Other names Dioxygenyl

Identifiers
CAS Number	12185-07-8
ChEBI	CHEBI:29372
ChemSpider	4574103
- InChI: InChI=1S/O2/c1-2/q+1 Key: KMHJKRGRIJONSV-UHFFFAOYSA-N
- Except where otherwise noted, data are given for materials in their standard state (at 25 °C [77 °F], 100 kPa). Infobox references

The dioxygenyl ion, O^{+}_{2}, has been studied in both the gas phase and in salts with anions that cannot be oxidized. The first synthesis was the hexafluoroplatinate O^{+}_{2}[PtF^{−}_{6}]. The oxygen-oxygen bond is quite strong, with a bond order of 2 1/2, rather than ground state oxygen's 1. Relative to most molecules, the ionization energy is very high at 1175 kJ/mol. As a result, the scope of the chemistry of O^{+}_{2} is quite limited, acting mainly as a one-electron oxidiser.

== Structure and molecular properties ==
O^{+}_{2} has a bond order of 2.5, and a bond length of 112.3 pm in solid O_{2}[AsF_{6}]. It is isoelectronic with nitric oxide and is paramagnetic. The bond energy is 625.1 kJ/mol and the stretching frequency is 1858 cm^{−1}, both of which are high relative to most of the molecules.

== Synthesis ==
Neil Bartlett demonstrated that dioxygenyl hexafluoroplatinate (O_{2}PtF_{6}), containing the dioxygenyl cation, can be prepared at room temperature by direct reaction of oxygen gas (O_{2}) with platinum hexafluoride (PtF_{6}):

O_{2} + PtF_{6} → [O_{2}]^{+}[PtF_{6}]^{−}

The compound can also be prepared from a mixture of fluorine and oxygen gases in the presence of a platinum sponge at 450 °C, and from oxygen difluoride (OF_{2}) above 400 °C:

6 OF_{2} + 2 Pt → 2 [O_{2}][PtF_{6}] + O_{2}

At lower temperatures (around 350 °C), platinum tetrafluoride is produced instead of dioxygenyl hexafluoroplatinate. Dioxygenyl hexafluoroplatinate played a pivotal role in the discovery of noble gas compounds. The observation that PtF_{6} is a powerful enough oxidising agent to oxidise O_{2} (which has a first ionization potential of 12.2 eV) led Bartlett to reason that it should also be able to oxidise xenon (first ionization potential 12.13 eV). His subsequent investigation yielded the first compound of a noble gas, xenon hexafluoroplatinate.

O^{+}_{2} is also found in similar compounds of the form O_{2}MF_{6}, where M is arsenic (As), antimony (Sb), gold (Au), niobium (Nb), ruthenium (Ru), rhenium (Re), rhodium (Rh), vanadium (V), or phosphorus (P). Other forms are also attested, including O_{2}GeF_{5} and (O_{2})_{2}SnF_{6}.

The tetrafluoroborate and hexafluorophosphate salts may be prepared by the reaction of dioxygen difluoride with boron trifluoride or phosphorus pentafluoride at −126 °C:

2 O_{2}F_{2} + 2 BF_{3} → 2 O_{2}BF_{4} + F_{2}
2 O_{2}F_{2} + 2 PF_{5} → 2 O_{2}PF_{6} + F_{2}

These compounds rapidly decompose at room temperature:

2 O_{2}BF_{4} → 2 O_{2} + F_{2} + 2 BF_{3}
2 O_{2}PF_{6} → 2 O_{2} + F_{2} + 2 PF_{5}

Some compounds including O_{2}Sn_{2}F_{9}, O_{2}Sn_{2}F_{9}·0.9HF, O_{2}GeF_{5}·HF, and O_{2}[Hg(HF)]_{4}(SbF_{6})_{9} can be made by ultraviolet irradiation of oxygen and fluorine dissolved in anhydrous hydrogen fluoride with a metal oxide.

All attempts to prepare O^{+}_{2} with chloro anions like [O_{2}]^{+}[SbCl_{6}]^{−} met with failure.

== Reactions ==
The reaction of O_{2}BF_{4} with xenon at 173 K (−100 °C) produces a white solid believed to be F–Xe–BF_{2}, containing an unusual xenon-boron bond:

2 O_{2}BF_{4} + 2 Xe → 2 O_{2} + F_{2} + 2 FXeBF_{2}

The dioxygenyl salts O_{2}BF_{4} and O_{2}AsF_{6} react with carbon monoxide to give oxalyl fluoride, C_{2}O_{2}F_{2}, in high yield.
