= Fluoroanion =

Negatively-charged ion containing a fluorine atom

- Hexafluoroaluminate

Identifiers
ChEBI	CHEBI:51527

Related compounds
Other anions	Chloroanion; Bromoanion; Iodoanion; Oxyanion; Thioanion; Selenoanion
- Except where otherwise noted, data are given for materials in their standard state (at 25 °C [77 °F], 100 kPa). Infobox references

In chemistry, a fluoroanion or fluorometallate anion is a polyatomic anion that contains one or more fluorine atoms. The ions and salts form from them are also known as complex fluorides. They can occur in salts, or in solution, but seldom as pure acids. Fluoroanions often contain elements in higher oxidation states. They mostly can be considered as fluorometallates, which are a subclass of halometallates. However some fluoroanions contain non-metals.

Anions that contain both fluorine and oxygen can be called "oxofluoroanions" (or rarely "fluorooxoanions").

== List of fluoroanions ==
The following is a list of fluoroanions, in atomic number order:

- trifluoroberyllate
- tetrafluoroberyllate
- tetrafluoroborate
- magnesium tetrafluoride
- trifluoroaluminate AlOF^{2−}_{3}
- tetrafluoroaluminate
- pentafluoroaluminate
- hexafluoroaluminate (fluoroaluminate)
- heptafluoroaluminate
- hexafluorosilicate
- hexafluorophosphate
- Sulfur trifluoride anion
- pentafluorosulfate(IV) aka pentafluorosulfite or Sulfur pentafluoride ion or sulfur pentafluoride anion [SF_{5}]^{−} gives off SF_{4} vapour.
- tetrafluorochlorate
- trifluoroscandate(II)?
- tetrafluoroscandate?
- hexafluoroscandate
- pentafluorotitanite [TiF_{5}]^{2−}
- hexafluorotitanite [TiF_{6}]^{3−}
- hexafluorotitanate [TiF_{6}]^{2−}
- tetrafluorovanadate(III)
- pentafluorovanadate(III)
- hexafluorovanadate(III)
- hexafluorovanadate(IV)
- hexafluorovanadate(V) unstable in water
- hexafluorochromite [CrF_{6}]^{3−}
- hexafluorochromate [CrF_{6}]^{2−}
- trifluoromanganate MnF^{−}_{3}
- hexafluoromanganate(III)
- hexafluoromanganate(IV)
- heptafluoromanganate IV
- Tetrafluoroferrate 1− and 2−
- hexafluoroferrate 4− and 3−
- tetrafluorocobaltate II
- Hexafluorocobaltate III and IV
- Heptafluorocobaltate IV
- Tetrafluoronickelate
- Hexafluoronickelate II, III, and IV
- hexafluorocuprate
- tetrafluorozincate
- Hexafluorogallate
- hexafluorogermanate
- hexafluoroarsenate
- tetrafluorobromate
- hexafluorobromate
- tetrafluoroyttrate
- pentafluorozirconate ZrF^{−}_{5}
- hexafluorozirconate ZrF^{2−}_{6}
- heptafluorozirconate ZrF^{3−}_{7}
- octafluorozirconate ZrF^{4−}_{8}
- hexafluoroniobate NbF^{−}_{6}
- heptafluoroniobate NbF^{2−}_{7}
- octafluoromolybdate MoF^{2−}_{8}
- tetrafluoropalladate
- hexafluororhodate
- hexafluororuthenate(IV)
- hexafluororuthenate(V)
- trifluoroargentate(I)
- hexafluoroindate
- hexafluorostannate
- fluoroantimonate
- hexafluoroiodate 1−
- octafluoroxenate
- tetrafluorolanthanate LaF^{−}_{4}
- pentafluorocerate IV
- Hexafluorocerate IV
- Heptafluorocerate IV
- octafluorocerate IV
- pentafluorohafnate
- hexafluorohafnate
- heptafluorotantalate TaF^{2−}_{7}
- octafluorotantalate
- heptafluorotungstate
- octafluorotungstate WF^{2−}_{8}
- octafluororhenate
- hexafluoroplatinate
- tetrafluoroaurate AuF^{−}_{4}
- hexafluoroaurate AuF^{−}_{6}
- trifluorothallate(I)
- tetrafluorothallate(I)
- tetrafluorothallate(III)
- hexafluorothallate(III)
- tetrafluorobismuthate BiF^{−}_{4}
- hexafluorobismuthate
- hexafluorothorate
- heptafluoroprotactinate(V)
- octafluoroprotactinate(V)
- hexafluorouranate(IV)
- hexafluorouranate(V)
- heptafluorouranate(VI)
- octafluorouranate(IV)
- octafluorouranate(V)
- octafluorouranate(VI)
- hexafluoroneptunate(IV)
- hexafluoroneptunate(V)
- hexafluoroneptunate(VII)
- heptafluoroneptunate(V)
- heptafluoroneptunate(VI)
- octafluoroneptunate(V)
- hexafluoroplutonate(IV)
- hexafluoroplutonate(V)
