= O2+ =

O2+ may refer to:

- Dioxygenyl (O^{+}_{2})
- Doubly ionized oxygen (O^{2+})
