= Platinum pentafluoride =

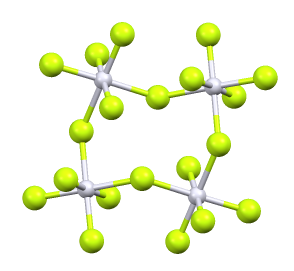

Names
- IUPAC name Platinum(V) fluoride
- Other names Platinum pentafluoride

Identifiers
CAS Number	13782-84-8
3D model (JSmol)	monomer: Interactive image; tetramer: Interactive image
CompTox Dashboard (EPA)	DTXSID101045630
- InChI: InChI=1S/5FH.Pt/h5*1H;/q;;;;;+5/p-5 Key: YKYDLLIWWRPCHN-UHFFFAOYSA-I
- SMILES: monomer: F[Pt](F)(F)(F)F; tetramer: F[Pt-]1(F)(F)(F)[F+][Pt-](F)(F)(F)(F)[F+][Pt-](F)(F)(F)(F)[F+][Pt-]([F+]1)(F)(F)(F)F

Properties
Chemical formula	F_{5}Pt
Molar mass	290.07
Appearance	red solid
Melting point	75–76 °C (167–169 °F; 348–349 K)
Boiling point	300–305 °C (572–581 °F; 573–578 K)

Related compounds
Related compounds	Platinum(IV) fluoride Platinum(VI) fluoride
- Except where otherwise noted, data are given for materials in their standard state (at 25 °C [77 °F], 100 kPa). Infobox references

Platinum pentafluoride is the inorganic compound with the empirical formula PtF_{5}. This red volatile solid has rarely been studied but is of interest as one of the few binary fluorides of platinum, i.e., a compound containing only Pt and F. It is hydrolyzed in water.

The compound was first prepared by Neil Bartlett by fluorination of platinum dichloride above 350 °C (below that temperature, only PtF_{4} forms).

Its structure consists of a tetramer, very similar to that of ruthenium pentafluoride. Within the tetramers, each Pt adopts octahedral molecular geometry, with two bridging fluoride ligands.
