= Chloroanion =

- hexachloroplatinate dianion

Identifiers
ChEBI	CHEBI:51520

Related compounds
Other anions	Fluoroanion, Oxyanion
- Except where otherwise noted, data are given for materials in their standard state (at 25 °C [77 °F], 100 kPa). Infobox references

A chloroanion is an anion that contains an element and chlorine atoms. They are also known as complex chlorides. They can occur in salts, or in solution, but not as pure acids. They mostly can be considered as chlorometallates which are a subclass of halometallates.

The maximum number of chlorido- ligands around a central atom may not be as many as for fluoroanions, as the chlorine atom is bigger than the fluorine. Some chloroanions are dimeric, where there is a bond between a pair of metal atoms, or some of the chloro ligands are in a bridge position, connected to two atoms.

Some chloroanions are stable in a solution in water, whereas others are decomposed. They may be stable in a molten salt, such as an ionic liquid. In the solid form some are only stable with large cations, as when there are small cations they may form two separate chloride salt phases.

Chloroanions include many transition metal chloride complexes, but there are also chloroanions for main-group elements, including some non-metals.

== List ==
- Tetrachloroberyllate [BeCl_{4}]^{2−}
- Tetrachloromagnesate [MgCl_{4}]^{2−}
- Tetrachloroborate [BCl_{4}]^{−}
- Tetrachloroaluminate [AlCl_{4}]^{−}
- Hexachloroaluminate [AlCl_{6}]^{3−}
- Tetrachlorogallate(III) [GaCl_{4}]^{−}
- Hexachlorothallate(III) [TlCl_{6}]^{3−}
- Hexachlorogermanate(IV) [GeCl_{6}]^{2−}
- Hexachlorophosphate(V) [PCl_{6}]^{−}
- Hexachloroarsenate(V) [AsCl_{6}]^{−}
- Hexachlorochromate(III) [CrCl_{6}]^{3−}
- Nonachlorodichromate(III) [Cr_{2}Cl_{9}]^{3−}, contains two chromium atoms linked via three chloride bridges
- Octachlorodimolybdate(II) [Mo_{2}Cl_{8}]^{4−}, contains Mo≣Mo quadruple bond
- Tetrachloroferrate(II) [FeCl_{4}]^{2−}
- Tetrachloroferrate(III) [FeCl_{4}]^{−}
- Tetrachlorocobaltate(II) [CoCl_{4}]^{2−}
- Tetrachloronickelate(II) [NiCl_{4}]^{2−}
- Hexachloroplatinate(IV) [PtCl_{6}]^{2−}
- Tetrachlorocuprate(II) [CuCl_{4}]^{2−}
- Hexachlorocuprate(II) [CuCl_{6}]^{4−}
- Tetrachloroaurate(III) [AuCl_{4}]^{−}
- Tetrachlorozincate(II) [ZnCl_{4}]^{2−}
