= Biological role of oxygen =

"Biological role of oxygen" can mean:

- Dioxygen in biological reactions, biological role of the dioxygen (O_{2}) substance
- Compounds of oxygen § Organic compounds, biological role of the element _{8}O (oxygen)
