= Gold hexafluoride =

Names
- IUPAC name Gold(VI) fluoride
- Other names Gold hexafluoride

Identifiers
3D model (JSmol)	Interactive image
- InChI: InChI=1S/Au.6FH/h;6*1H/q+6;;;;;;/p-6 Key: PNIORJQZAPGWIB-UHFFFAOYSA-H
- SMILES: F[Au](F)(F)(F)(F)F

Properties
Chemical formula	AuF_{6}
Molar mass	310.956989 g·mol^{−1}

Related compounds
Related compounds	Platinum hexafluoride
- Except where otherwise noted, data are given for materials in their standard state (at 25 °C [77 °F], 100 kPa). Infobox references

Gold hexafluoride is a binary inorganic chemical compound of gold and fluorine with the chemical formula AuF_{6}. As of 2023, it is still a hypothetical compound that has never been prepared or observed. In 1999, Neil Bartlett stated, "It should exist, if made at low temperature and kept cold."

== Potential properties ==
Like PtF_{6}, AuF_{6} should be an extremely powerful oxidizer. The compound is calculated to be stable.
