= DCHP =

DCHP may refer to:

- A Dictionary of Canadianisms on Historical Principles
- Dicyclohexyl phthalate, a phthalate
- Dicaesium hexachloroplutonate, a compound of plutonium
- Chemnitz-Hilbersdorf rail station (station code DCHP), Saxony, Germany; see List of railway stations in Chemnitz

== See also ==
- DHCP (disambiguation)
