= Xenon hexafluoroplatinate =

Names
- Other names Xenon(I) hexafluoroplatinate

Identifiers
| CAS Number | 12062-18-9 |
| 3D model (JSmol) | Interactive image; Interactive image |
- InChI: InChI=1S/FXe.5FH.Pt/c1-2;;;;;;/h;5*1H;/q+1;;;;;;+4/p-5 Key: UYCVEIGQQZDBRR-UHFFFAOYSA-I
- SMILES: F[Xe+].F[Pt-1](F)(F)(F)F; F[Xe+].F[Pt-1](F)(F)(F)(F)(F)[Pt](F)(F)(F)(F)F

Properties
| Chemical formula | Xe^{+}[PtF_{6}]^{−} |
| Molar mass | 440.367 |
| Appearance | orange solid |
- Except where otherwise noted, data are given for materials in their standard state (at 25 °C [77 °F], 100 kPa). Infobox references

Xenon hexafluoroplatinate in a PFA tube.

Xenon hexafluoroplatinate is the product of the reaction of platinum hexafluoride with xenon, in an experiment that proved the chemical reactivity of the noble gases. This experiment was performed in 1962 by Neil Bartlett at the University of British Columbia, who formulated the product as "Xe^{+}[PtF_{6}]^{−}", although subsequent work suggests that Bartlett's product was probably a salt mixture and did not in fact contain this specific salt.

== Structure ==
The material described originally as "xenon hexafluoroplatinate" is probably not Xe^{+}[PtF_{6}]^{−}. The main problem with this formulation is "Xe^{+}", which would be a radical and would dimerize or abstract a fluorine atom to give XeF^{+}. Thus, Bartlett discovered that Xe undergoes chemical reactions, but the nature and purity of his initial mustard yellow product remains uncertain. Further work indicates that Bartlett's product probably also contained products of further oxidation by PtF_{6}, platinum(V) derivatives PtF_{5}, [XeF]^{+}[PtF_{5}]^{−}, and [XeF]^{+}[Pt_{2}F_{11}]^{−}. The title "compound" is a salt, consisting of an octahedral anionic fluoride complex of platinum and various xenon cations.

It has been proposed that the platinum fluoride forms a negatively charged polymeric anion with xenon fluoride cations. A preparation of "XePtF_{6}" by reaction of XeF_{2} and PtF_{4} in anhydrous HF solution results in a solid which has been characterized as a [PtF_{5}]^{−} polymeric or oligomeric anion associated with XeF^{+}. Such F-bridged polymeric chains and tetrameric ring with pendant XeF^{+} units have been observed in the crystal structures of the analogous compounds XeCrF_{6} (XeF_{2}∙CrF_{4}) and XeMnF_{6} (XeF_{2}∙MnF_{4}), respectively. These structures could serve as structural models for XePtF_{6}.

== Preparation ==
Xenon hexafluoroplatinate is prepared from xenon and platinum hexafluoride (PtF_{6}) as gaseous solutions in SF_{6}. The reactants are combined at 77 K and slowly warmed to allow for a controlled reaction.

== Discovery ==
In 1962, Neil Bartlett, together with his graduate student Derek Lohmann, discovered that a mixture of platinum hexafluoride gas and oxygen formed a red solid. The red solid turned out to be dioxygenyl hexafluoroplatinate, O^{+}_{2}[PtF_{6}]^{−}. Bartlett noticed that the ionization energy for O_{2} (1175 kJ mol^{−1}), was very close to the ionization energy for Xe (1170 kJ mol^{−1}) – "Immediately, I realized that the heavier noble gases had ionization potentials like that of O_{2} [...]." He then asked his colleagues to give him some xenon "so that he could try out some reactions". He later recounted the discovery:

"It had taken a few weeks to order in some xenon," he says, "and because I had no experienced coworkers, I was obliged to prepare all apparatus and PtF₆, by myself." Because of his teaching schedule, Bartlett wasn't ready to carry out the experiment until Friday, March 23. "It took all morning to make my PtF₆ and all afternoon to assemble the remainder of the apparatus, test it for leaks, and thoroughly dry it by flaming out the glass and quartz under vacuum," he says. Finally, at about 6:45 PM he transferred his small sample of PtF₆ to a sensitive quartz sickle gauge and measured its pressure. He then added xenon into the gauge to roughly the same pressure. "When I broke the seal between the red PtF₆, and the colorless xenon, it was about 7 PM," he recalls. "The two gases reacted instantly to precipitate a deep-yellow solid. The measurements indicated that the yellow solid had a composition XePtF₆. "Naturally, I thought that I should share this remarkable result with someone else. There was no one in the building! It appeared that everyone had left for dinner." It took Bartlett two more hours to hydrolyze the sublimed solid to show that it contained xenon, a finding confirmed by his colleague David Frost. "When I got home, it was about 9:30 PM," Bartlett remembers. "My wife had been anxiously wondering where I was, and dinner was ruined. She is not a chemist, so it took a little while to persuade her that I had an excellent excuse!"

— NOBLE GAS REACTIVITY RESEARCH HONORED

Although, as discussed above, the product was probably a mixture of several compounds, Bartlett's work was the first proof that compounds could be prepared from a noble gas. Since Bartlett's observation, many well-defined compounds of xenon have been reported including XeF_{2}, XeF_{4}, and XeF_{6}.

== See also ==
- Hexafluoroplatinate
- Xenon hexafluororhodate
