= Rhodium hexafluoride =

Chemical compound with formula RhF6

Names
- IUPAC name rhodium(VI) fluoride
- Other names rhodium hexafluoride

Identifiers
CAS Number	13693-07-7
3D model (JSmol)	Interactive image
PubChem CID	20488757
CompTox Dashboard (EPA)	DTXSID80608008
- InChI: Key: PDNXMXVYNVZBTD-UHFFFAOYSA-H; InChI=1/6FH.2Rh/h6*1H;;/q;;;;;;+6/p-6
- SMILES: F[Rh](F)(F)(F)(F)F

Properties
Chemical formula	F_{6}Rh
Molar mass	216.91 g/mol
Appearance	black crystalline solid
Density	3.71g/mL
Melting point	≈ 70 °C (158 °F; 343 K)
- Except where otherwise noted, data are given for materials in their standard state (at 25 °C [77 °F], 100 kPa). Infobox references

Rhodium hexafluoride, also rhodium(VI) fluoride, (RhF_{6}) is the inorganic compound of rhodium and fluorine. A black volatile solid, it is a highly reactive material which starts to slowly thermally decompose already at room temperature and a rare example of a rhodium(VI) compound. It is one of seventeen known binary hexafluorides.

== Structure ==
The RhF_{6} molecule has octahedral molecular geometry. Consistent with its d^{3} configuration, the six Rh–F bond lengths are equivalent, being 1.824 Å. It crystallises in an orthorhombic space group Pnma with lattice parameters of a = 9.323 Å, b = 8.474 Å, and c = 4.910 Å.

== Discovery and synthesis ==
Rhodium hexafluoride was discovered by American radiochemists in 1961, soon after the discovery of ruthenium hexafluoride. It is prepared by reaction of rhodium metal with an excess of elemental fluorine:

Rh + 3 F_{2} → RhF_{6}

== Reactions ==
Like some other metal fluorides, RhF_{6} is highly oxidizing. It attacks glass, and can even react with elemental oxygen.
