= Hexafluoroplatinate =

Ionic compound containing PtF6- anion

Platinum hexafluoride, the building block of hexafluoroplatinates.

A hexafluoroplatinate is a chemical compound which contains the hexafluoroplatinate PtF^{−}_{6} anion. It is produced by combining substances with platinum hexafluoride.

== Examples of hexafluoroplatinates ==
- Dioxygenyl hexafluoroplatinate (O_{2}PtF_{6}), containing the rare dioxygenyl oxycation.
- Xenon hexafluoroplatinate ("XePtF_{6}"), the first noble gas compound ever synthesised. (The Xe^{+} ion in XePtF_{6} is unstable, being a radical; as a result, XePtF_{6} itself is unstable and quickly disproportionates into XeFPtF_{5}, XeFPt_{2}F_{11}, and Xe_{2}F_{3}PtF_{6}.)

== See also ==
- Hexachloroplatinate
