= Polonium hexafluoride =

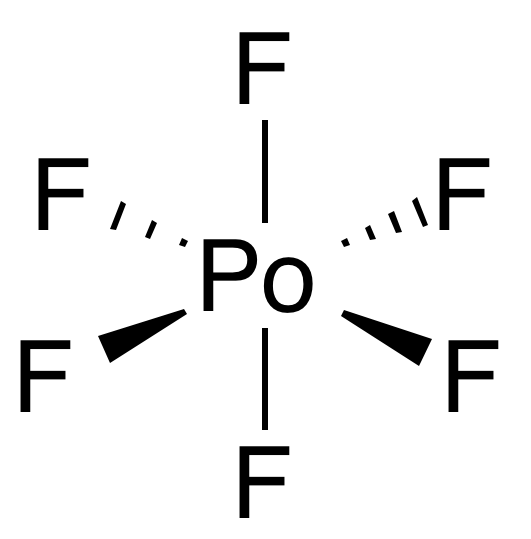

Identifiers
CAS Number	35473-38-2
3D model (JSmol)	Interactive image
CompTox Dashboard (EPA)	DTXSID501045632
- InChI: InChI=1S/6FH.Po/h6*1H;/q;;;;;;+6/p-6 Key: RAVVYVDKSAGRIR-UHFFFAOYSA-H
- SMILES: F[Po](F)(F)(F)(F)F

Properties
Chemical formula	PoF_{6}
Molar mass	322.97 g/mol
Appearance	white solid
- Except where otherwise noted, data are given for materials in their standard state (at 25 °C [77 °F], 100 kPa). Infobox references

Polonium hexafluoride (PoF_{6}) is a possible chemical compound of polonium and fluorine and one of the seventeen known binary hexafluorides.

== Synthesis ==
The synthesis of PoF_{6} via the reaction

^{210}Po + 3 F_{2} → ^{210}PoF_{6}

was attempted in 1945, but the attempt was unsuccessful. The boiling point was predicted to be about −40 °C.

^{208}PoF_{6} was probably successfully synthesised via the same reaction in 1960 with the more stable isotope ^{208}Po, where a volatile polonium fluoride was produced, but it was not fully characterized before it underwent radiolysis and decomposed to polonium tetrafluoride.
