= Fluoronickelate =

Class of chemical compounds

The fluoronickelates are a class of chemical compounds containing an anion with nickel at its core, surrounded by fluoride ions which act as ligands. This makes it a fluoroanion. The nickel atom can be in a range of oxidation states from +2, +3 to +4. The hexafluoronickelate(IV)^{2−} ion NiF_{6}^{2−} contains nickel in the maximal +4 state, and is in octahedral coordination by the fluoride atoms. It forms a commercially available salt Potassium hexafluoronickelate(IV) K_{2}NiF_{6}. Solid double salts can also contain tetrafluoronickelate NiF_{4} eg K_{2}NiF_{4}.

formula	name	Ni Ox	structure	Remarks	references
(NH_{4})_{2}NiF_{4}	ammonium tetrafluoronickelate	2		Fuse NiCl_{2} with NH_{4}F, light green color	
(NH_{4})_{2}NiF_{4}·2H_{2}O	ammonium tetrafluoronickelate dihydrate	2		Formed from Ni(OH)_{2} and NH_{4}F in water	
K_{2}NiF_{4}	potassium tetrafluoronickelate	2			
Rb_{2}NiF_{4}	rubidium tetrafluoronickelate	2			
Ba_{2}NiF_{6}	barium nickel fluoride	2		yellow square plates cas=18115-49-6	
Pb_{2}NiF_{6}	lead(II)nickel(II) fluoride	2		cas=27037-78-1	
Li_{3}NiF_{6}		3	Pna2 C^{9}_{2v} a=9.60 Å b=8.37 Å c=4.09 Å Z=4 density=3.27 / 3.24	formed at 500° 70 bar F_{2}	
Na_{3}NiF_{6}	sodium hexafluoronickelate	3		violet cas=22707-99-9	
K_{3}NiF_{6}	potassium hexafluoronickelate	3		violet cas=14881-07-3	
KCs_{2}NiF_{6}	dicesium potassium hexafluoronickelate	3		lilac colour cas=53479-35-9	
Li_{2}NiF_{6}	lithium hexafluoronickelate	4	hexagonal a=8.321 Å c=4.598 Å V=275.7 Å^{3} Z=3	pink sol 0.5 g/100 g HF at 0°	
(O_{2})_{2}NiF_{6}	dioxygenyl hexafluoronickelate			possibly existing, decompose 10°	
(NO_{2})_{2}NiF_{6}	dinitronium hexafluoronickelate	4		ΔH=-471 kJ/mol, ΔH^{0}_{f}=-1120	
Na_{2}NiF_{6}	sodium hexafluoronickelate	4	cubic; or tetragonal	purple red	
K_{2}NiF_{6}	potassium hexafluoronickelate	4	K_{2}PtCl_{6} structure	red cas=17218-47-2	
CaNiF_{6}	calcium hexafluoronickelate	4		ΔH=-363 kJ/mol, ΔH^{0}_{f}=-1951 kJ/mol sold as a fluorine source	
Rb_{2}NiF_{6}	rubidium hexafluoronickelate	4	K_{2}PtCl_{6} structure	red cas=17218-48-3	
Cs_{2}NiF_{6}	Cesium hexafluoronickelate	4	K_{2}PtCl_{6} structure	red cas=17218-49-4	
SrNiF_{6}	strontium hexafluoronickelate	4		red cas=66456-12-0	
BaNiF_{6}	barium hexafluoronickelate	4	K_{2}PtCl_{6} structure	red cas=66456-13-1	
(NF_{4})_{2}NiF_{6}	bis-tetrafluoroammonium hexafluoronickelate	4	tetragonal K_{2}PtCl_{6} structure	red cas=63105-40-8	
(ClF_{2}O)NiF_{6}	bis [difluorooxychlorine (V)] hexafluoronickelate (IV)	4		deep purple, stable to 60 °C	
