= DHCP (disambiguation) =

DHCP is the Dynamic Host Configuration Protocol, one of the protocols in the TCP/IP networking suite.

DHCP may also refer to:

- Decentralized Hospital Computer Program, an information system used throughout the United States Department of Veterans Affairs
- Directed Hamiltonian cycle problem, an instance of Hamiltonian cycle problem for a directed graph
- Double hexagonal close packed, in crystallography

== See also ==
- DHCPv6, a version of DHCP for the IPv6 networking suite
- High-bandwidth Digital Content Protection (HDCP)
- DCHP (disambiguation)
