= Plutonium chloride =

Plutonium chloride may refer to:

- Plutonium(III) chloride (plutonium trichloride), PuCl_{3}
- Plutonium tetrachloride, PuCl_{4}
