= Caesium heptafluoroxenate =

Identifiers
CAS Number	19033-04-6
3D model (JSmol)	Interactive image
- InChI: InChI=1S/Cs.F7Xe/c;1-8(2,3,4,5,6)7/q+1;-1 Key: IAPXLONHTNZYMY-UHFFFAOYSA-N
- SMILES: [Cs+].F[Xe-](F)(F)(F)(F)(F)F

Properties
Chemical formula	Cs[XeF_{7}]
Molar mass	397.187 g·mol^{−1}
Appearance	yellow solid
- Except where otherwise noted, data are given for materials in their standard state (at 25 °C [77 °F], 100 kPa). Infobox references

Caesium heptafluoroxenate is an inorganic compound of caesium, and fluorine, and xenon with the chemical formula Cs[XeF_{7}]. It consists of caesium cations Cs^{+} and heptafluoroxenate(VI) anions [XeF_{7}]^{−}.

== Preparation ==
Caesium heptafluoroxenate can be prepared by dissolving caesium fluoride in liquid xenon hexafluoride:

CsF + XeF_{6} → Cs[XeF_{7}]

== Properties ==
Caesium heptafluoroxenate is a yellow solid that is stable at room temperature. It is a very strong oxidizer. The compound decomposes at 50 °C to produce caesium octafluoroxenate:

2 Cs[XeF_{7}] → Cs_{2}[XeF_{8}] + XeF_{6}

== Uses ==
Caesium heptafluoroxenate is used to isolate xenon hexafluoride from a reaction mixture.
