= Hexachloroplutonate =

Ion containing plutonium and chlorine

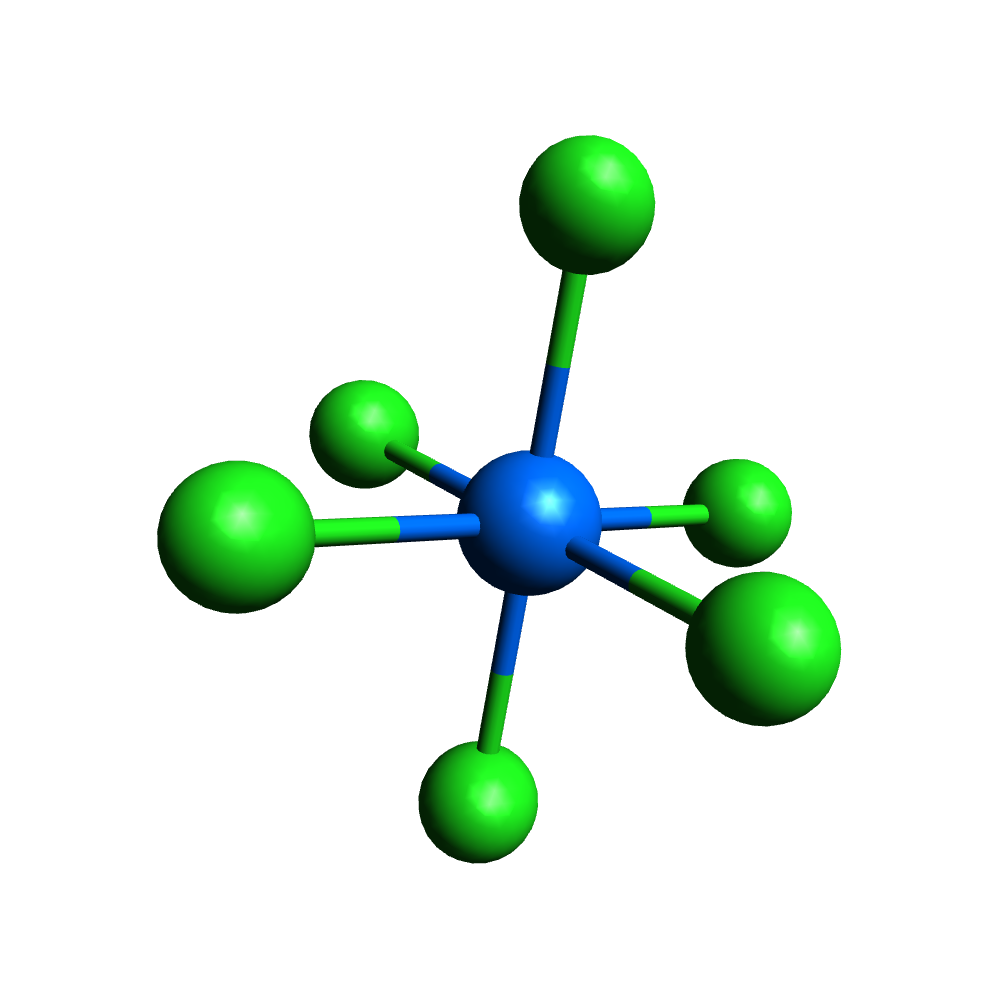
- The hexachloroplutonate dianion

Identifiers
3D model (JSmol)	Interactive image
- InChI: InChI=1S/6ClH.Pu/h6*1H;/q;;;;;;+4/p-6 Key: QYJYVEJBCPQDNB-UHFFFAOYSA-H
- SMILES: Cl[Pu-2](Cl)(Cl)(Cl)(Cl)Cl

Properties
Chemical formula	PuCl^{2−}_{6}
Molar mass	457 g·mol^{−1}

Related compounds
Other anions	Hexafluoroplutonate
Other cations	Hexachloroplatinate; Hexachloropalladate; Hexachlorogermanate(IV)
- Except where otherwise noted, data are given for materials in their standard state (at 25 °C [77 °F], 100 kPa). Infobox references

The hexachloroplutonate ion, PuCl^{2−}_{6}, is an ion containing plutonium and chlorine. It forms several salts, which are called hexachloroplutonates.

== Structure and bonding ==
The PuCl^{2−}_{6} ion features a slightly distorted octahedral molecular geometry, with three distinct Pu-Cl bonds. The Pu-Cl bond lengths vary between 2.574 and 2.598 Å, and the Cl-Pu-Cl bond angles range between 88.54° and 91.46°.

The Pu-Cl bonds in PuCl^{2−}_{6} are primarily ionic; however, they feature small but important amounts of covalent bonding. The chloride ligands bond using their s and p electrons, while plutonium bonds using its s, d, and f electrons. The Pu-Cl bond order is less than 1, and the shape of the Pu-Cl bond slightly deviates from cylindrical, possibly indicating a small amount of pi bonding. The 5f electrons in the PuCl^{2−}_{6} have a large nephelauxetic effect (decrease in electron-electron repulsion).

== In aqueous solution ==
It is the dominant species of plutonium(IV) in 11 M hydrochloric acid solution.

== Salts ==
The PuCl^{2−}_{6} ion forms several salts. Dicaesium hexachloroplutonate (Cs_{2}PuCl_{6}) is a pale yellow solid which is precipitated from concentrated HCl solution by the addition of caesium chloride. Cs_{2}PuCl_{6} can be used to prepare other plutonium compounds, such as the cyclopentadienide complex (η^{5}-C_{5}H_{5})_{3}PuCl, and it has been proposed for use in the purification of plutonium metal. It has been used as a reference for plutonium(IV), and due to its stability, it has been proposed for use as a primary standard for plutonium. Potassium and rubidium hexachloroplutonates, K_{2}PuCl_{6} and Rb_{2}PuCl_{6}, are also known. They are prepared by heating mixtures of plutonium(III) chloride and the respective alkali metal chlorides under high chlorine pressures.

PuCl^{2−}_{6} is also known to form salts with quaternary ammonium cations, including tetramethylammonium, tetraethylammonium, and tetrabutylammonium. The tetramethylammonium and tetraethylammonium salts, [NMe_{4}]_{2}[PuCl_{6}] and [NEt_{4}]_{2}[PuCl_{6}], form orange-yellow crystals. [NEt_{4}]_{2}[PuCl_{6}] was used in the first synthesis of plutonocene. The tetrabutylammonium salt, [N(n-Bu)_{4}]_{2}[PuCl_{6}], is prepared by the addition of tetrabutylammonium chloride to plutonium(IV) in HCl aqueous solution. It is soluble in several organic solvents.

PuCl^{2−}_{6} is also known to form salts with pyridinium, pyridinium derivatives, and tetraphenylphosphonium.
