= Potassium tetrafluoronickelate =

Identifiers
CAS Number	13859-60-4
3D model (JSmol)	Interactive image
ChemSpider	21160197
EC Number	237-595-3
PubChem CID	44149288
CompTox Dashboard (EPA)	DTXSID90930160
- InChI: InChI=1S/4FH.2K.Ni/h4*1H;;;/q;;;;2*+1;+2/p-4 Key: UIRGKRRTSXFSTG-UHFFFAOYSA-J
- SMILES: F[Ni-2](F)(F)F.[K+].[K+]

Properties
Chemical formula	F_{4}K_{2}Ni
Molar mass	212.8836 g·mol^{−1}
Appearance	green solid
Density	3.36 g/cm^{3}
- Except where otherwise noted, data are given for materials in their standard state (at 25 °C [77 °F], 100 kPa). Infobox references

Potassium tetrafluoronickelate is the inorganic compound with the formula K_{2}NiF_{4}. It features octahedral (high spin) Ni centers with Ni-F bond lengths of 2.006 Å. This green solid is a salt of tetrafluoronickelate. It is prepared by melting a mixture of nickel(II) fluoride, potassium fluoride, and potassium bifluoride. The compound adopts a perovskite-like structure consisting of layers of octahedral Ni centers interconnected by doubly bridging fluoride ligands. The layers are interconnected by potassium cations. It is one of the principal Ruddlesden-Popper phases. Early discoveries on cuprate superconductors focused on compounds with structures closely related to K_{2}NiF_{4}, e.g. lanthanum cuprate and derivative lanthanum barium copper oxide.

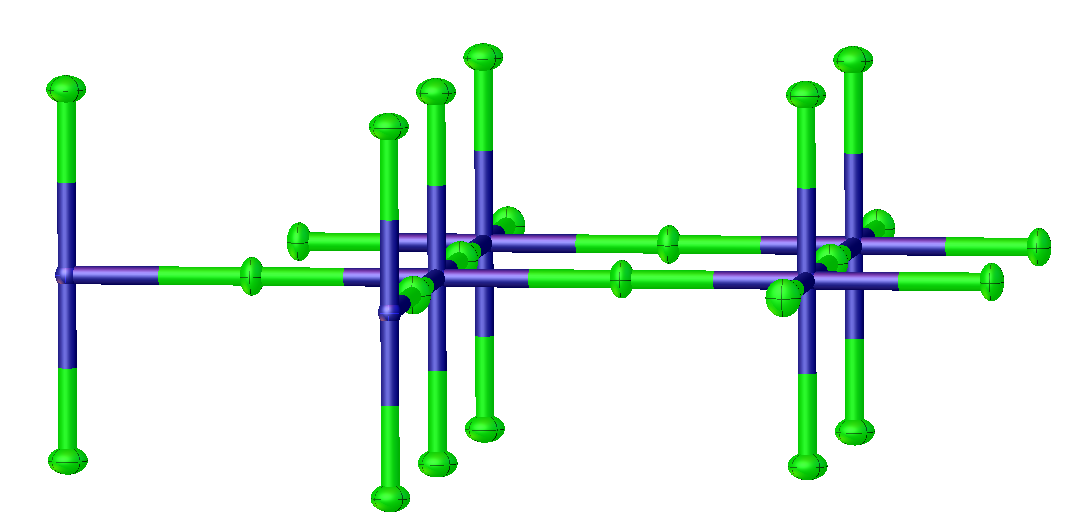
Nickel difluoride layers that comprise K_{2}NiF_{4}.
