= Hexachloroplatinate =

Anion

- The hexachloroplatinate dianion

Identifiers
CAS Number	16871-54-8
3D model (JSmol)	Interactive image
ChEBI	CHEBI:30119
ChemSpider	55729
Gmelin Reference	26710
PubChem CID	61857
CompTox Dashboard (EPA)	DTXSID20880048
- InChI: InChI=1S/6ClH.Pt/h6*1H;/q;;;;;;+4/p-6 Key: GBFHNZZOZWQQPA-UHFFFAOYSA-H
- SMILES: Cl[Pt-2](Cl)(Cl)(Cl)(Cl)Cl

Properties
Chemical formula	Cl_{6}Pt^{2−}
Molar mass	407.79 g·mol^{−1}

Related compounds
Other anions	Hexafluoroplatinate
Other cations	Hexachloroplutonate; Hexachloropalladate; Hexachlorogermanate(IV)
- Except where otherwise noted, data are given for materials in their standard state (at 25 °C [77 °F], 100 kPa). Infobox references

Hexachloroplatinate is an anion with the chemical formula [PtCl_{6}]^{2−}.

Chemical compounds containing the hexachloroplatinate anion include:

- Chloroplatinic acid (or dihydrogen hexachloroplatinate), H_{2}PtCl_{6}
- Ammonium hexachloroplatinate, (NH_{4})_{2}PtCl_{6}
- Potassium hexachloroplatinate, K_{2}PtCl_{6}
- Sodium hexachloroplatinate, Na_{2}PtCl_{6}

== Related compounds/anions ==
- The unstable hexachloropalladic acid (H_{2}PdCl_{6})
- Hexachloropalladate (PdCl^{2−}_{6})
- Hexafluoroplatinate (PtF^{−}_{6})
