= Dioxygenyl hexafluoroplatinate =

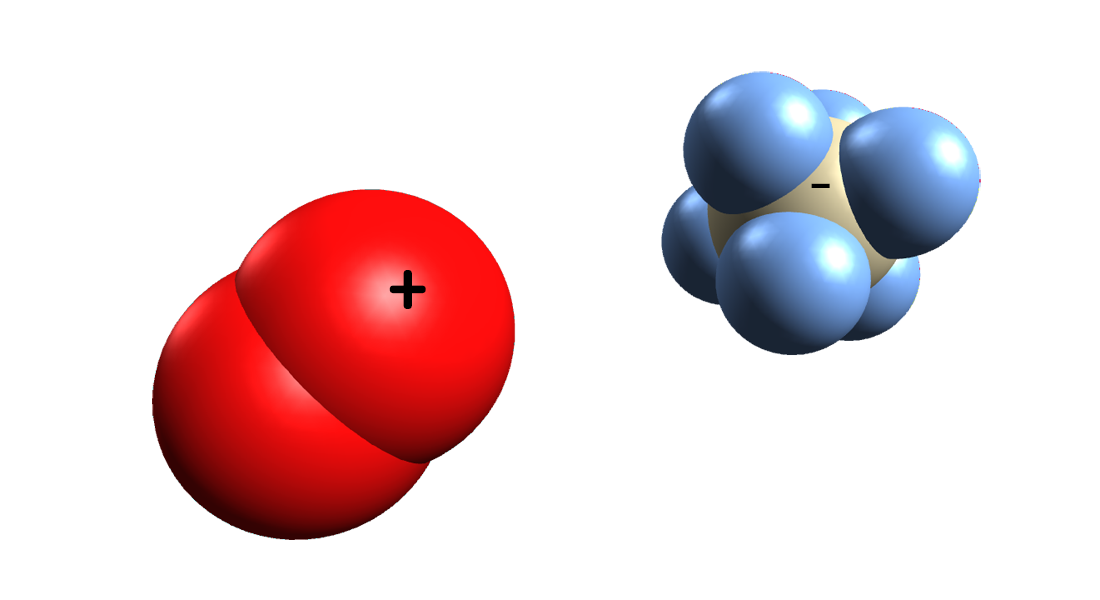

Names
- IUPAC name Dioxygenyl hexafluoroplatinate
- Other names Dioxygenyl hexafluoroplatinate(V)

Identifiers
| CAS Number | 54359-96-5 |
| 3D model (JSmol) | Interactive image |
| CompTox Dashboard (EPA) | DTXSID601350157 |
- InChI: InChI=1S/6FH.O2.Pt/c;;;;;;1-2;/h6*1H;;/q;;;;;;+1;+5/p-6 Key: VUKFIJBZILBYOF-UHFFFAOYSA-H
- SMILES: O=[O+].F[Pt-](F)(F)(F)(F)F

Properties
| Chemical formula | F_{6}O_{2}Pt |
| Molar mass | 341.072 g·mol^{−1} |
- Except where otherwise noted, data are given for materials in their standard state (at 25 °C [77 °F], 100 kPa). Infobox references

Dioxygenyl hexafluoroplatinate is a compound with formula O_{2}PtF_{6}. It is a hexafluoroplatinate of the unusual dioxygenyl cation, O_{2}^{+}, and is the first known compound containing this cation. It can be produced by the reaction of dioxygen with platinum hexafluoride. The fact that PtF_{6} is strong enough to oxidise O_{2}, whose first ionization potential is 12.2 eV, led Neil Bartlett to correctly surmise that it might be able to oxidise xenon (first ionization potential 12.13 eV). This led to the discovery of xenon hexafluoroplatinate, which proved that the noble gases, previously thought to be inert, are able to form chemical compounds.

== Preparation ==
Dioxygenyl hexafluoroplatinate can be synthesized from the elements by the action of a mixture of oxygen and fluorine gas on platinum sponge at 450 °C. It can also be prepared by the reaction of oxygen difluoride (OF_{2}) with platinum sponge.

At 350 °C, platinum tetrafluoride is produced:

2 OF_{2} + Pt → PtF_{4} + O_{2}

Above 400 °C, dioxygenyl hexafluoroplatinate is formed:

6 OF_{2} + 2 Pt → 2 O_{2}PtF_{6} + O_{2}

Bartlett demonstrated that it can be synthesized at room temperature by the reaction of oxygen gas with PtF_{6}.

O_{2} + PtF_{6} → O_{2}PtF_{6}

== Structure ==
Dioxygenyl hexafluoroplatinate(V) has a rhombohedral crystal structure at low temperatures, and a cubic structure at high temperatures, isomorphous to potassium hexafluoroplatinate(V), KPtF_{6}. Its ionic lattice is indicated by its insolubility in carbon tetrafluoride. In its cubic form, the PtF^{−}_{6} octahedra are slightly compressed along the three-fold rotational axis, along which the long axis of the [O_{2}]^{+} cations also lies. Each O^{+}_{2} cation is surrounded by 12 fluorine atoms, 6 of which surround it in a puckered six-membered ring, and of the remaining 3 each belong to the two PtF^{−}_{6} octahedra lying along the long axis of the cation.

== Reactions ==
Dioxygenyl hexafluoroplatinate(V) is a convenient route to prepare other platinum(V) compounds, such as potassium hexafluoroplatinate(V) via reaction with potassium fluoride in iodine pentafluoride (IF_{5}) solution in which iodine heptafluoride is produced:

2 O_{2}PtF_{6} + 2 KF + IF_{5} → 2 KPtF_{6} + 2 O_{2} + IF_{7}
