= Krypton hexafluoride =

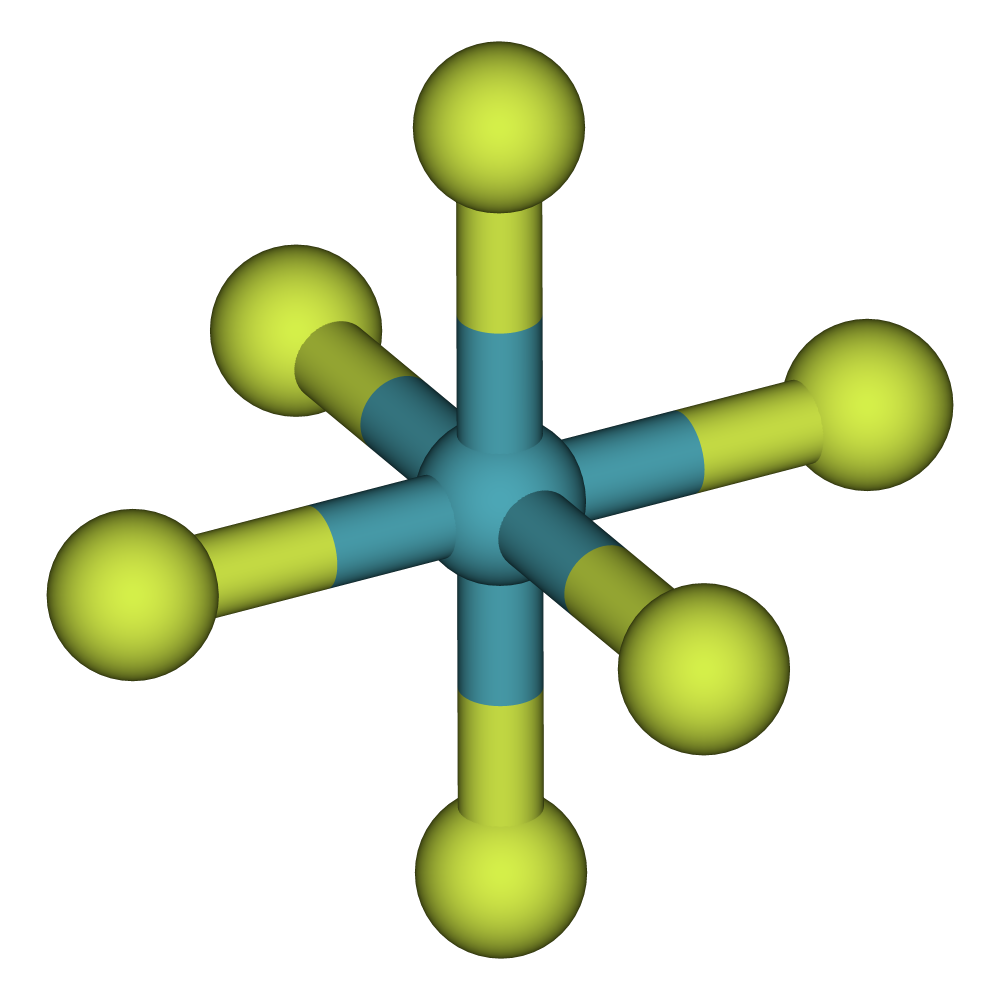

Names
- Other names Krypton(VI) fluoride

Identifiers
3D model (JSmol)	Interactive image
- InChI: InChI=1S/F6Kr/c1-7(2,3,4,5)6 Key: FLBFFHZDXUHIEP-UHFFFAOYSA-N
- SMILES: F[Kr](F)(F)(F)(F)F

Properties
Chemical formula	F_{6}Kr
Molar mass	197.788 g·mol^{−1}
Appearance	claimed to be white crystalline solid

Related compounds
Related compounds	Xenon hexafluoride
- Except where otherwise noted, data are given for materials in their standard state (at 25 °C [77 °F], 100 kPa). Infobox references

Krypton hexafluoride is an inorganic chemical compound of krypton and fluorine with the chemical formula KrF_{6}. It is still a hypothetical compound. Calculations indicate it is unstable.

== History ==
In 1933, Linus Pauling predicted that the heavier noble gases would be able to form compounds with fluorine and oxygen. He also predicted the existence of krypton hexafluoride. Calculations suggest it would have octahedral molecular geometry.

So far, out of all possible krypton fluorides, only krypton difluoride (KrF_{2}) has actually been synthesized.
