= Ruthenium hexafluoride =

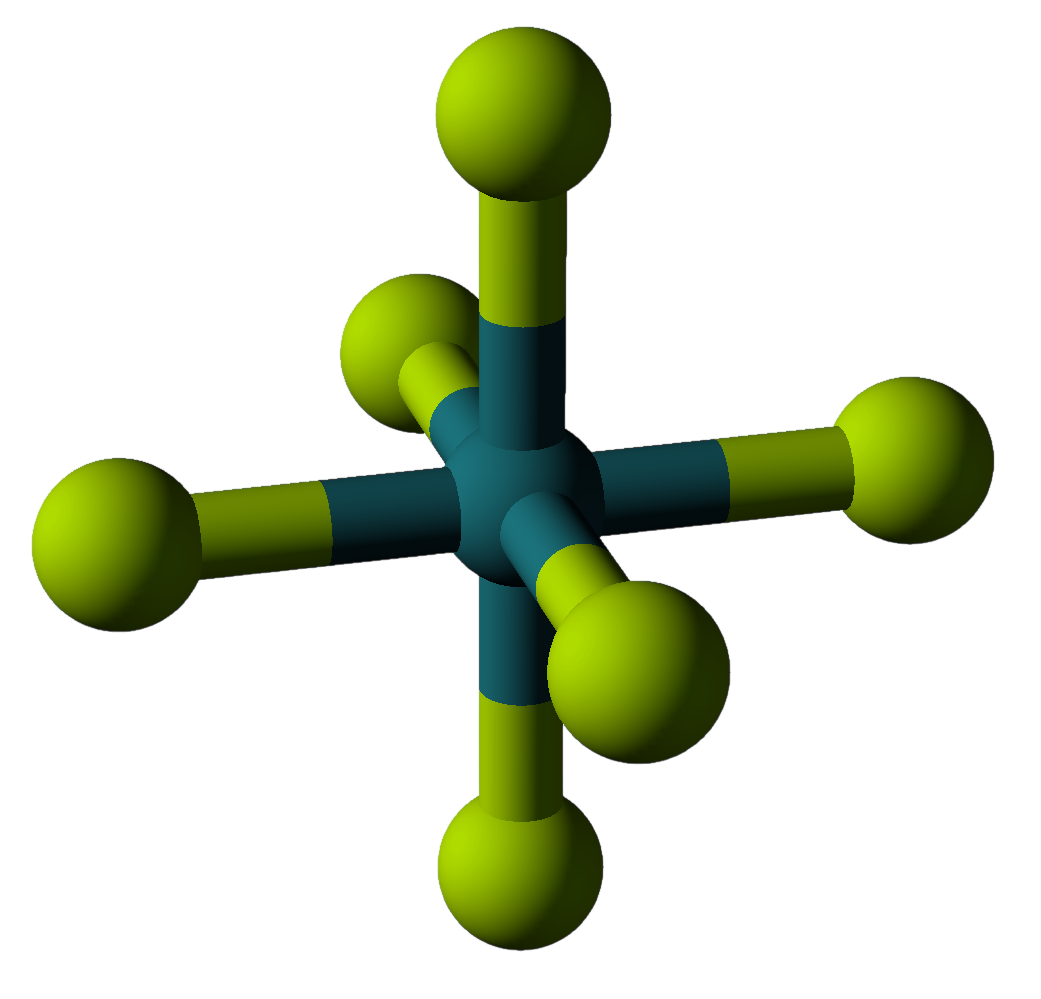

Names
- IUPAC name ruthenium(VI) fluoride
- Other names ruthenium(6+) hexafluoride

Identifiers
CAS Number	13693-08-8
3D model (JSmol)	Interactive image
ChemSpider	57450716
PubChem CID	21528530
CompTox Dashboard (EPA)	DTXSID50615608
- InChI: InChI=1/6FH.2Ru/h6*1H;;/q;;;;;;+6/p-6 Key: NHWBVRAPBLSUQQ-UHFFFAOYSA-H
- SMILES: F[Ru](F)(F)(F)(F)F

Properties
Chemical formula	RuF_{6}
Molar mass	215.07 g/mol
Appearance	dark brown crystalline solid
Density	3.54 g/cm^{3}
Melting point	54 °C (129 °F; 327 K)
Boiling point	200 °C (392 °F, 473.15 K) (decomposes)
Solubility in water	reacts
- Except where otherwise noted, data are given for materials in their standard state (at 25 °C [77 °F], 100 kPa). Infobox references

Ruthenium hexafluoride, also ruthenium(VI) fluoride (RuF_{6}), is a compound of ruthenium and fluorine and one of the seventeen known binary hexafluorides.

== History and synthesis ==
Ruthenium hexafluoride was discovered by American radiochemists in 1961, soon after the discovery of technetium hexafluoride. It is made by a direct reaction of ruthenium metal in a gas stream of fluorine and argon at 400–450 °C. The yields of this reaction are less than 10%.

Ru + 3 F_{2} → RuF_{6}

== Description ==
Ruthenium hexafluoride is a dark brown crystalline solid that melts at 54 °C. The solid structure measured at −140 °C is orthorhombic space group Pnma. Lattice parameters are a = 9.313 Å, b = 8.484 Å, and c = 4.910 Å. There are four formula units (in this case, discrete molecules) per unit cell, giving a density of 3.68 g·cm^{−3}.

The RuF_{6} molecule itself (the form important for the liquid or gas phase) has octahedral molecular geometry, which has point group (O_{h}). The Ru–F bond length is 1.818 Å.
