= Dicaesium hexachloroplutonate =

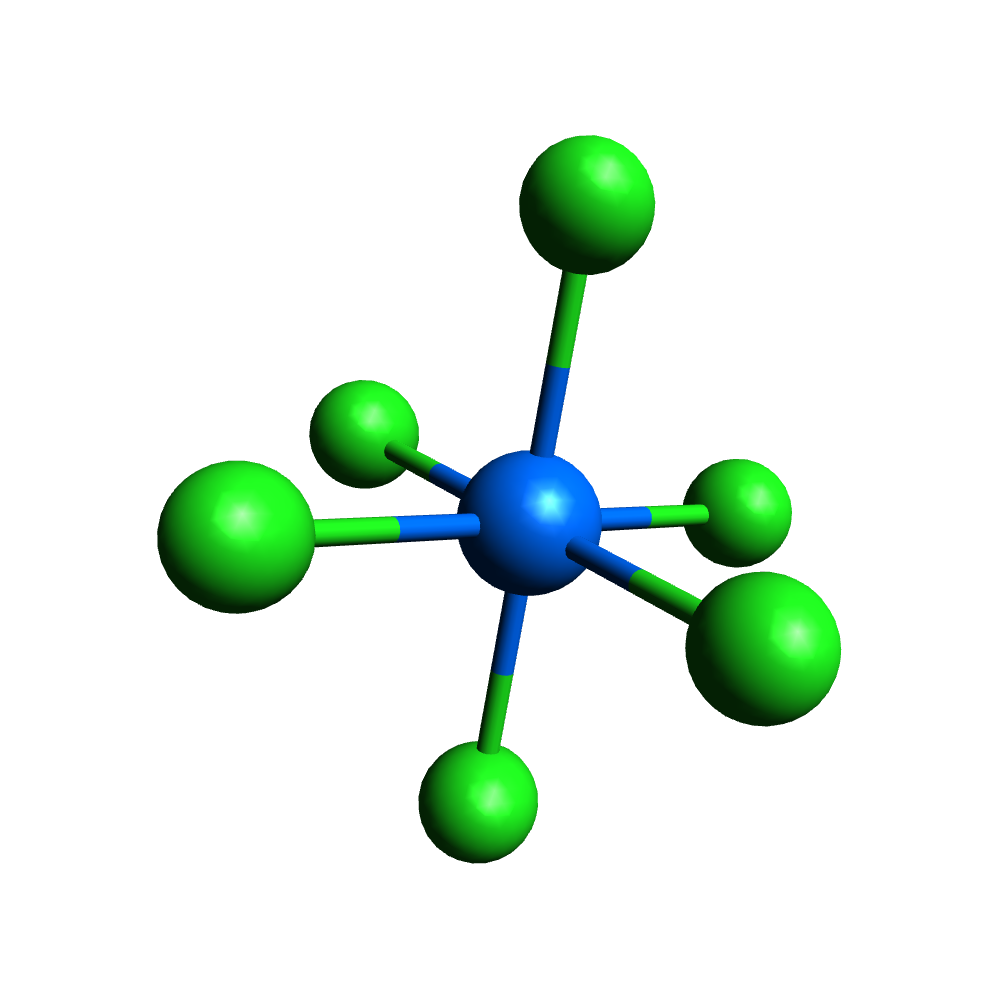

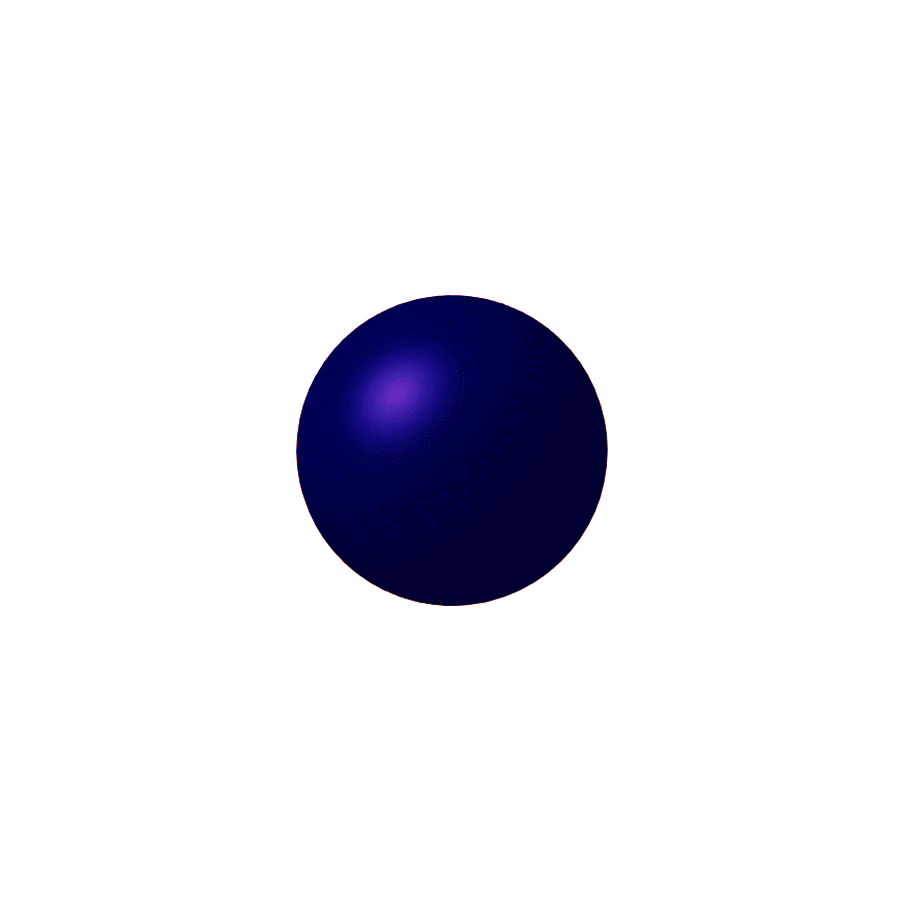

Names
- Other names Dicesium hexachloroplutonate DCHP; Dicaesium plutonium hexachloride Dicesium plutonium hexachloride

Identifiers
CAS Number	24352-13-4
3D model (JSmol)	Interactive image
- InChI: InChI=1S/6ClH.2Cs.Pu/h6*1H;;;/q;;;;;;2*+1;+4/p-6 Key: HSTAMIWUDFNTGM-UHFFFAOYSA-H
- SMILES: [Cs+].[Cs+].Cl[Pu-2](Cl)(Cl)(Cl)(Cl)Cl

Properties
Chemical formula	Cs_{2}PuCl_{6}
Molar mass	723 g·mol^{−1}
Density	4.10 g/cm^{3}
Solubility	Soluble in dilute acids

Related compounds
Other anions	Caesium hexachloroplatinate
Other cations	Tetramethylammonium hexachloroplutonate(IV)
- Except where otherwise noted, data are given for materials in their standard state (at 25 °C [77 °F], 100 kPa). Infobox references

Dicaesium hexachloroplutonate (or DCHP) is a compound of caesium, plutonium, and chlorine with formula Cs_{2}PuCl_{6}. It has been used in the synthesis of other plutonium compounds, and in the purification of plutonium metal.

== Properties ==
Dicaesium hexachloroplutonate forms pale yellow crystals which adopt the K_{2}GeF_{6}-type structure and are trigonal. Each plutonium atom is bonded to six chlorine atoms as discrete hexachloroplutonate anions (PuCl^{2−}_{6}), and each caesium atom is bonded to twelve chlorine atoms. The hexachloroplutonate ion has octahedral molecular geometry, and in DCHP, the Pu-Cl bond length is 2.62 Å. The Cs-Cl bonds have a length of 3.71 Å.

DCHP is a stoichiometric compound, and unlike other plutonium compounds, such as plutonium(IV) nitrate, DCHP is non-hygroscopic.

== Synthesis ==
DCHP is prepared by first suspending a plutonium sample in water. Then, concentrated hydrochloric acid is added to the mixture. To ensure that all the plutonium is in the +4 oxidation state, an aqueous solution containing sodium chlorite is mixed in with the plutonium solution. Immediately upon adding caesium chloride solution, Cs_{2}PuCl_{6} is precipitated, and is left to sit for 12 hours. The Cs_{2}PuCl_{6} powder is then isolated by vacuum filtration, washed with concentrated HCl, and then left to dry for 8 hours at 120 °C in an oven.

== Uses ==
=== As a standard ===
Because of several of its properties, such as its non-hygroscopicity, high equivalent weight, and an absence of non-stoichiometry, it has been proposed for use as a plutonium primary standard. It has been used as a reference for plutonium in its +4 oxidation state.

=== In plutonium separation ===
Before it shut down, DCHP was used at Rocky Flats Plant in the separation of americium from plutonium metal. It was used as an oxidant to oxidize plutonium metal to plutonium(III) chloride in a molten calcium chloride matrix. Any americium would then react with plutonium(III) chloride and be extracted into the calcium chloride matrix.

== Reactions ==
Dicaesium hexachloroplutonate can undergo several reactions, and as such, it is used to prepare other plutonium compounds. For example, upon reaction with cyclopentadienylthallium in acetonitrile solution, it forms the coordination complex (η^{5}-C_{5}H_{5})_{3}PuCl:

Cs_{2}PuCl_{6} + 3 Tl(C_{5}H_{5}) → (η^{5}-C_{5}H_{5})_{3}PuCl + 2 CsCl + 3 TlCl

It also reacts with magnesium cyclopentadienide in tetrahydrofuran to give an emerald green product, most likely (η^{5}-C_{5}H_{5})_{3}Pu(THF) (THF=tetrahydrofuran), which loses its tetrahydrofuran ligand upon sublimation to form (η^{5}-C_{5}H_{5})_{3}Pu. Plutonium(III) chloride, PuCl_{3}, also reacts with magnesium cyclopentadienide, though the reaction occurs much more slowly, likely because PuCl_{3} has a polymeric structure while Cs_{2}PuCl_{6} contains discrete PuCl^{2−}_{6} groups.

Dicaesium hexachloroplutonate can also be used to synthesize plutonium tetrachloride adducts. Upon reaction with amides or phosphine oxides, it forms the adducts PuCl_{4}L_{2} or PuCl_{4}L_{3} (L=amide or phosphine oxide).

Dicaesium hexachloroplutonate reacts with ammonia to form the complex PuCl_{4}·~7–8NH_{3}. It is an ammine complex, meaning the ammonia groups are bonded to the plutonium atom. The complex decomposes over time to give the solid PuCl_{4}·~5NH_{3}, which is stable at room temperature.
