= Potassium hexafluoronickelate(IV) =

Names
- IUPAC name potassium hexafluoronickelate(IV)

Identifiers
CAS Number	17218-47-2
3D model (JSmol)	Interactive image
ChemSpider	21241633
ECHA InfoCard	100.153.655
EC Number	625-130-0
CompTox Dashboard (EPA)	DTXSID20849392
- InChI: InChI=1S/6FH.2K.Ni/h6*1H;;;/q;;;;;;2*+1;+4/p-6
- SMILES: [K+].[K+].F[Ni-2](F)(F)(F)(F)F

Properties
Chemical formula	K_{2}NiF_{6}
Molar mass	250.8804 g·mol^{−1}

Hazards
- GHS labelling
Pictograms	(GHS06: Toxic) (GHS07: Exclamation mark) (GHS08: Health hazard)
Signal word	Danger
Hazard statements	H302, H312, H317, H331, H350
Precautionary statements	P201, P261, P280, P304+P340, P405, P501
Safety data sheet (SDS)	External SDS
- Except where otherwise noted, data are given for materials in their standard state (at 25 °C [77 °F], 100 kPa). Infobox references

Potassium hexafluoronickelate(IV) is an inorganic compound with the chemical formula K_{2}NiF_{6}. It can be produced through the reaction of potassium fluoride, nickel dichloride, and fluorine.

It reacts violently with water, releasing oxygen. It dissolves in anhydrous hydrogen fluoride to produce a light-red solution. Potassium hexafluoronickelate(IV) decomposes at 350 °C, forming potassium hexafluoronickelate(III), nickel(II) fluoride, and fluorine:

$$\rm \ 3 K_2NiF_6 \xrightarrow{\Delta} 2 K_3NiF_6 + NiF_2 + 2 F_2$$

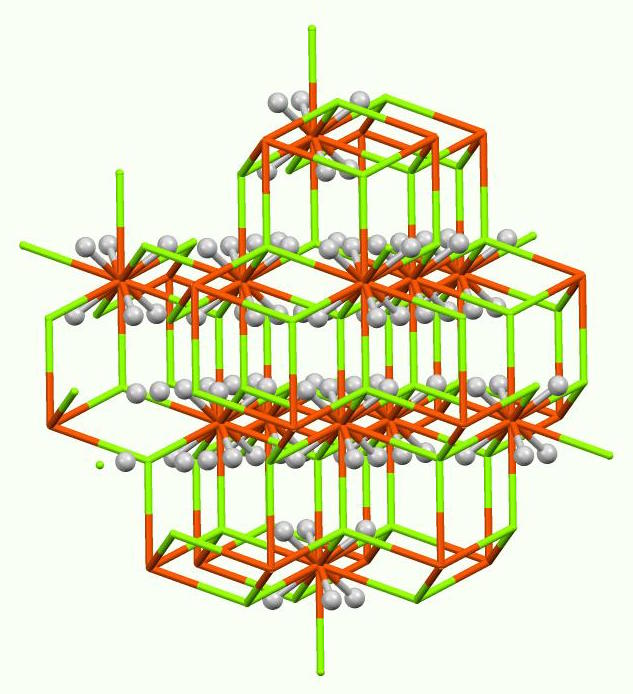
Chemical structure of solid K_{2}NiF_{6} as determined by X-ray crystallography.

Potassium hexafluoronickelate is a strong oxidant. It can turn chlorine pentafluoride and bromine pentafluoride into ClF^{+}_{6} and BrF^{+}_{6}, respectively:

$$\rm \ K_2NiF_6 + 5 AsF_5 + XF_5 \xrightarrow{aHF} XF_6AsF_6 + Ni(AsF_6)_2 + 2KAsF_6$$
( X = Cl or Br , -60 °C , aHF = anhydrous hydrogen fluoride).

Potassium hexafluoronickelate decomposes at high temperatures to release fluorine gas; like terbium(IV) fluoride, the emitted fluorine is primarily monatomic rather than the typical diatomic.

It adopts the structure seen for K_{2}PtCl_{6} and Mg_{2}FeH_{6}.
