= Platinum tetrafluoride =

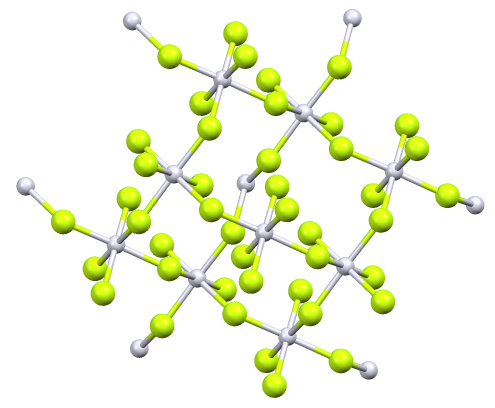

Names
- IUPAC name Platinum(IV) fluoride
- Other names Platinum tetrafluoride Platinous fluoride

Identifiers
CAS Number	13455-15-7
3D model (JSmol)	Interactive image
ChemSpider	122983
PubChem CID	139460
CompTox Dashboard (EPA)	DTXSID70158789
- InChI: InChI=1S/4FH.Pt/h4*1H;/q;;;;+4/p-4 Key: VFKKSKGQZDULMV-UHFFFAOYSA-J
- SMILES: F[Pt](F)(F)F

Properties
Chemical formula	F_{4}Pt
Molar mass	271.078
Appearance	red-orange solid
Density	7.08 g/cm^{3} (calc.)
Melting point	600 °C (1,112 °F; 873 K)
Magnetic susceptibility (χ)	+455.0·10^{−6} cm^{3}/mol

Structure
Crystal structure	Orthorhombic, oF40
Space group	Fdd2, No. 43
Lattice constant	a = 0.9284 nm, b = 0.959 nm, c = 0.5712 nm

Related compounds
Other anions	Platinum(IV) bromide Platinum(IV) chloride
Related compounds	Platinum(V) fluoride Platinum(VI) fluoride
- Except where otherwise noted, data are given for materials in their standard state (at 25 °C [77 °F], 100 kPa). Infobox references

Platinum tetrafluoride is the inorganic compound with the chemical formula PtF_{4}. In the solid state, the compound features platinum(IV) in octahedral coordination geometry.

== Properties ==
Platinum tetrafluoride vapour at 298.15 K consists of individual molecules. The enthalpy of sublimation is 210 kJmol^{−1}. Original analysis of powdered PtF_{4} suggested a tetrahedral molecular geometry, but later analysis by several methods identified it as octahedral, with four of the six fluorines on each platinum bridging to adjacent platinum centres.

== Preparation ==
The compound was first reported by Henri Moissan by the fluorination of platinum metal in the presence of hydrogen fluoride. A modern synthesis involves thermal decomposition of platinum hexafluoride.

== Reactions ==
A solution of platinum tetrafluoride in water is coloured reddish brown, but it rapidly decomposes, releasing heat and forming an orange coloured platinum dioxide hydrate precipitate and fluoroplatinic acid. When heated to a red hot temperature, platinum tetrafluoride decomposes to platinum metal and fluorine gas. When heated in contact with glass, silicon tetrafluoride gas is produced along with the metal.

Platinum tetrafluoride can form adducts with selenium tetrafluoride and bromine trifluoride. Volatile crystalline adducts are also formed in combination with BF_{3}, PF_{3}, BCl_{3}, and PCl_{3}.

== Related compounds ==
The fluoroplatinates are salts containing the PtF_{6}^{2−} ion. Fluoroplatinic acid H_{2}PtF_{6} forms yellow crystals that absorb water from the air. Ammonium, sodium, magnesium, calcium, strontium, and rare earth including lanthanum fluoropalatinate salts are soluble in water. Potassium, rubidium, caesium, and barium salts are insoluble in water.
