= Neil Bartlett (chemist) =

British chemist (1932–2008)

- Born: 15 September 1932; Newcastle-upon-Tyne, England
- Died: 5 August 2008 (aged 75); Walnut Creek, California, United States
- Citizenship: US
- Education: King's College, University of Durham (Newcastle University)
- Known for: Creating the first noble gas compound
- Awards: Corday–Morgan Prize (1962); Steacie Prize (1965); Elliott Cresson Medal (1968); Welch Award in Chemistry (1976); William H. Nichols Medal (1983); Davy Medal (2002)
- Scientific career
- Fields: Chemistry
- Institutions: University of British Columbia; Princeton University; University of California, Berkeley

Neil Bartlett (15 September 1932 – 5 August 2008) was a British chemist who specialized in fluorine and compounds containing fluorine, and became famous for creating the first noble gas compounds. He taught chemistry at the University of British Columbia and the University of California, Berkeley.

== Biography ==
Neil Bartlett was born on 15 September 1932 in Newcastle-upon-Tyne, England. Bartlett's interest in chemistry dated back to an experiment at Heaton Grammar School when he was only eleven years old, in which he prepared "beautiful, well-formed" crystals by reaction of aqueous ammonia with copper sulfate. He explored chemistry by constructing a makeshift lab in his parents' home using chemicals and glassware he purchased from a local supply store. He went on to attend King's College, University of Durham (which went on to become Newcastle University) in the United Kingdom where he obtained a Bachelor of Science (1954) and then a doctorate (1958) in the inorganic chemistry research group of Dr. P.L. Robinson.

In 1958, Bartlett's career began upon being appointed a lecturer in chemistry at the University of British Columbia in Vancouver, BC, Canada where he would ultimately reach the rank of full professor. During his time at the university he made his discovery that noble gases were indeed reactive enough to form bonds. He remained there until 1966, when he moved to Princeton University as a professor of chemistry and a member of the research staff at Bell Laboratories. He then went on to join the chemistry department at the University of California, Berkeley in 1969 as a professor of chemistry until his retirement in 1993. He was also a staff scientist at Lawrence Berkeley National Laboratory from 1969 to 1999. In 2000, he became a naturalized citizen of the United States. He died on 5 August 2008 of a ruptured aortic aneurysm. He lived with his wife Christina Bartlett until his death. They had four children.

== Research ==
Bartlett's main speciality was the chemistry of fluorine and of compounds containing fluorine.

=== Noble Gas Compounds ===
In 1962, Neil Bartlett, together with his graduate student Derek Lohmann, discovered that a mixture of platinum hexafluoride gas and oxygen formed a red solid. The red solid turned out to be dioxygenyl hexafluoroplatinate, O^{+}_{2}[PtF_{6}]^{−}. Bartlett noticed that the ionization energy for O_{2} (1175 kJ mol^{−1}), was very close to the ionization energy for Xe (1170 kJ mol^{−1}) – "Immediately, I realized that the heavier noble gases had ionization potentials like that of O_{2} [...]." He then asked his colleagues to give him some xenon "so that he could try out some reactions". He later recounted the discovery:

"It had taken a few weeks to order in some xenon," he says, "and because I had no experienced coworkers, I was obliged to prepare all apparatus and PtF₆, by myself." Because of his teaching schedule, Bartlett wasn't ready to carry out the experiment until Friday, March 23. "It took all morning to make my PtF₆ and all afternoon to assemble the remainder of the apparatus, test it for leaks, and thoroughly dry it by flaming out the glass and quartz under vacuum," he says. Finally, at about 6:45 PM he transferred his small sample of PtF₆ to a sensitive quartz sickle gauge and measured its pressure. He then added xenon into the gauge to roughly the same pressure. "When I broke the seal between the red PtF₆, and the colorless xenon, it was about 7 PM," he recalls. "The two gases reacted instantly to precipitate a deep-yellow solid. The measurements indicated that the yellow solid had a composition XePtF₆. "Naturally, I thought that I should share this remarkable result with someone else. There was no one in the building! It appeared that everyone had left for dinner. "It took Bartlett two more hours to hydrolyze the sublimed solid to show that it contained xenon, a finding confirmed by his colleague David Frost. "When I got home, it was about 9:30 PM," Bartlett remembers. "My wife had been anxiously wondering where I was, and dinner was ruined. She is not a chemist, so it took a little while to persuade her that I had an excellent excuse!"

— NOBLE GAS REACTIVITY RESEARCH HONORED

This contradicted established models of the nature of valency, as it was believed that all noble gases were entirely inert to chemical combination. His discovery incited other chemists to discover several other fluorides of xenon: XeF_{2}, XeF_{4}, and XeF_{6}.

== Honors ==
In 1968 he was awarded the Elliott Cresson Medal. In 1973, he was made a Fellow of the Royal Society (United Kingdom). In 1976 he received the Welch Award in Chemistry for his synthesis of chemical compounds of noble gases and the consequent opening of broad new fields of research in the inorganic chemistry. He was elected a Fellow of the American Academy of Arts and Sciences in 1977. In 1979, he was honored as a Foreign Associate of the National Academy of Sciences. He was awarded the prestigious Davy Medal in 2002 for his discovery that the noble gases were not that noble after all. In 2006, his research into the reactivity of noble gases was designated jointly by the American Chemical Society and the Canadian Society for Chemistry (CSC) as an International Historic Chemical Landmark at the University of British Columbia in recognition of its significance, "fundamental to the scientific understanding of the chemical bond." Bartlett was nominated for a Nobel Prize in Chemistry every year between 1963 and 1966 but did not get the Prize.

== Hospitalization ==
In January 1963, Bartlett and his graduate student, P. R. Rao, were hospitalized after an explosion in the laboratory. As they looked at what they thought might be the first crystals of XeF_{2}, the compound exploded, getting shards of glass in the eyes of both men. According to Bartlett, he thought that the compound may have contained water molecules, and he and Rao took off their glasses to get a better look. They were both taken to the hospital for four weeks, and Bartlett was left with damaged vision in one eye. The last piece of glass from this accident was removed 27 years later.
