= Xenon hexafluoride =

Structural formula
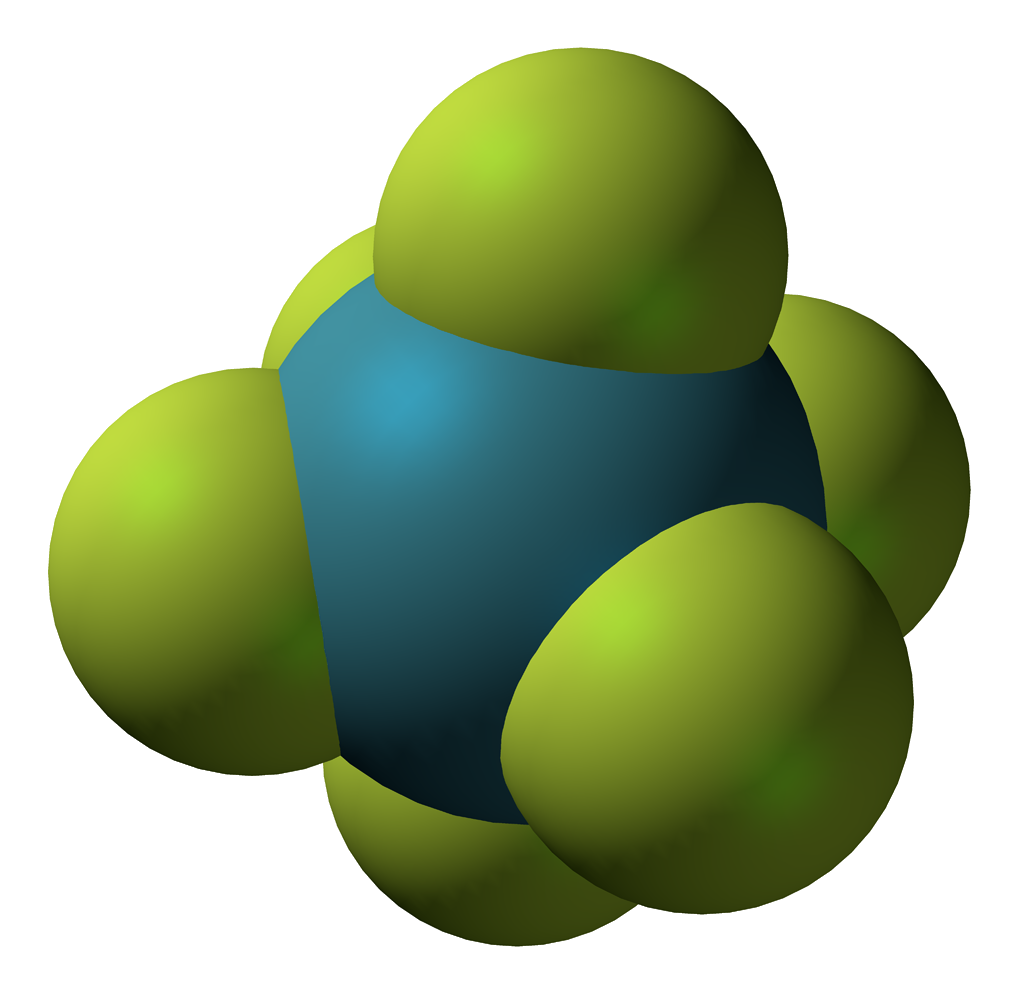
Space-filling model

Identifiers
CAS Number	13693-09-9
3D model (JSmol)	Interactive image
ChemSpider	123066
PubChem CID	139546
UNII	WXC3I4P46T
CompTox Dashboard (EPA)	DTXSID80160010
- InChI: InChI=1S/F6Xe/c1-7(2,3,4,5)6 Key: ARUUTJKURHLAMI-UHFFFAOYSA-N; InChI=1/F6Xe/c1-7(2,3,4,5)6 Key: ARUUTJKURHLAMI-UHFFFAOYAF
- SMILES: F[Xe](F)(F)(F)(F)F

Properties
Chemical formula	XeF_{6}
Molar mass	245.28 g mol^{−1}
Density	3.56 g cm^{−3}
Melting point	49.25 °C (120.65 °F; 322.40 K)
Boiling point	75.6 °C (168.1 °F; 348.8 K)
Solubility in water	reacts

Thermochemistry
Std enthalpy of formation (Δ_{f}H^{⦵}_{298})	−294 kJ·mol^{−1}

Related compounds
Related compounds	Krypton hexafluoride
- Except where otherwise noted, data are given for materials in their standard state (at 25 °C [77 °F], 100 kPa). verify (what is ?) Infobox references

Xenon hexafluoride is a noble gas compound with the formula XeF_{6}. It is one of the three binary fluorides of xenon that have been studied experimentally, the other two being XeF_{2} and XeF_{4}. All of them are exergonic and stable at normal temperatures. XeF_{6} is the strongest fluorinating agent of the series. It is a colorless solid that readily sublimes into intensely yellow vapors.

== Preparation ==
Xenon hexafluoride can be prepared by heating of XeF_{2} at about 300 °C under 6 MPa (60 atmospheres) of fluorine. With NiF_{2} as catalyst, however, this reaction can proceed at 120 °C even in xenon-fluorine molar ratios as low as 1:5.

== Structure ==
The structure of XeF_{6} required several years to establish in contrast to the cases of XeF_{2} and XeF_{4}. In the gas phase the compound is monomeric. VSEPR theory predicts that due to the presence of six fluoride ligands and one lone pair of electrons the structure lacks perfect octahedral symmetry, and indeed electron diffraction combined with high-level calculations indicate that the compound's point group is C_{3v}. It is a fluxional molecule. O_{h} is only insignificantly higher, indicating that the minimum on the energy surface is very shallow.

^{129}Xe and ^{19}F NMR spectroscopy indicates that in solution the compound assumes a tetrameric structure: four equivalent xenon atoms are arranged in a tetrahedron surrounded by a fluctuating array of 24 fluorine atoms that interchange positions in a "cogwheel mechanism".

Six polymorphs of XeF_{6} are known. including one that contains XeF^{+}_{5} ions with bridging F^{−} ions.

== Reactions ==
=== Hydrolysis ===
Xenon hexafluoride hydrolyzes, ultimately affording xenon trioxide:

XeF_{6} + H_{2}O → XeOF_{4} + 2 HF
XeOF_{4} + H_{2}O → XeO_{2}F_{2} + 2 HF
XeO_{2}F_{2} + H_{2}O → XeO_{3} + 2 HF
XeF_{6} + 3 H_{2}O → XeO_{3} + 6 HF

XeF_{6} is a Lewis acid, binding one and two fluoride anions:

XeF_{6} + F^{−} → XeF^{−}_{7}
XeF^{−}_{7} + F^{−} → XeF^{2−}_{8}

=== Octafluoroxenates ===
Salts of the octafluoroxenate(VI) anion (XeF^{2−}_{8}) are very stable, decomposing only above 400 °C. This anion has been shown to have square antiprismatic molecular geometry, based on single-crystal X-ray counter analysis of its nitrosonium salt, (NO)_{2}XeF_{8}. The sodium and potassium salts are formed directly from sodium fluoride and potassium fluoride:

2 NaF + XeF_{6} → Na_{2}XeF_{8}
2 KF + XeF_{6} → K_{2}XeF_{8}

These are thermally less stable than the caesium and rubidium salts, which are synthesized by first forming the heptafluoroxenate salts:

CsF + XeF_{6} → CsXeF_{7}
RbF + XeF_{6} → RbXeF_{7}

which are then pyrolysed at 50 °C and 20 °C, respectively, to form the yellow octafluoroxenate salts:

2 CsXeF_{7} → Cs_{2}XeF_{8} + XeF_{6}
2 RbXeF_{7} → Rb_{2}XeF_{8} + XeF_{6}

These salts are hydrolysed by water, yielding various products containing xenon and oxygen.

The two other binary fluorides of xenon do not form such stable adducts with fluoride.

=== With fluoride acceptors ===
XeF_{6} reacts with strong fluoride acceptors such as RuF_{5} and BrF_{3}·AuF_{3} to form the XeF^{+}_{5} cation:

XeF_{6} + RuF_{5} → XeF^{+}_{5}RuF^{−}_{6}

XeF_{6} + BrF_{3}·AuF_{3} → XeF^{+}_{5}AuF^{−}_{4} + BrF_{3}
