= Platinum hexafluoride =

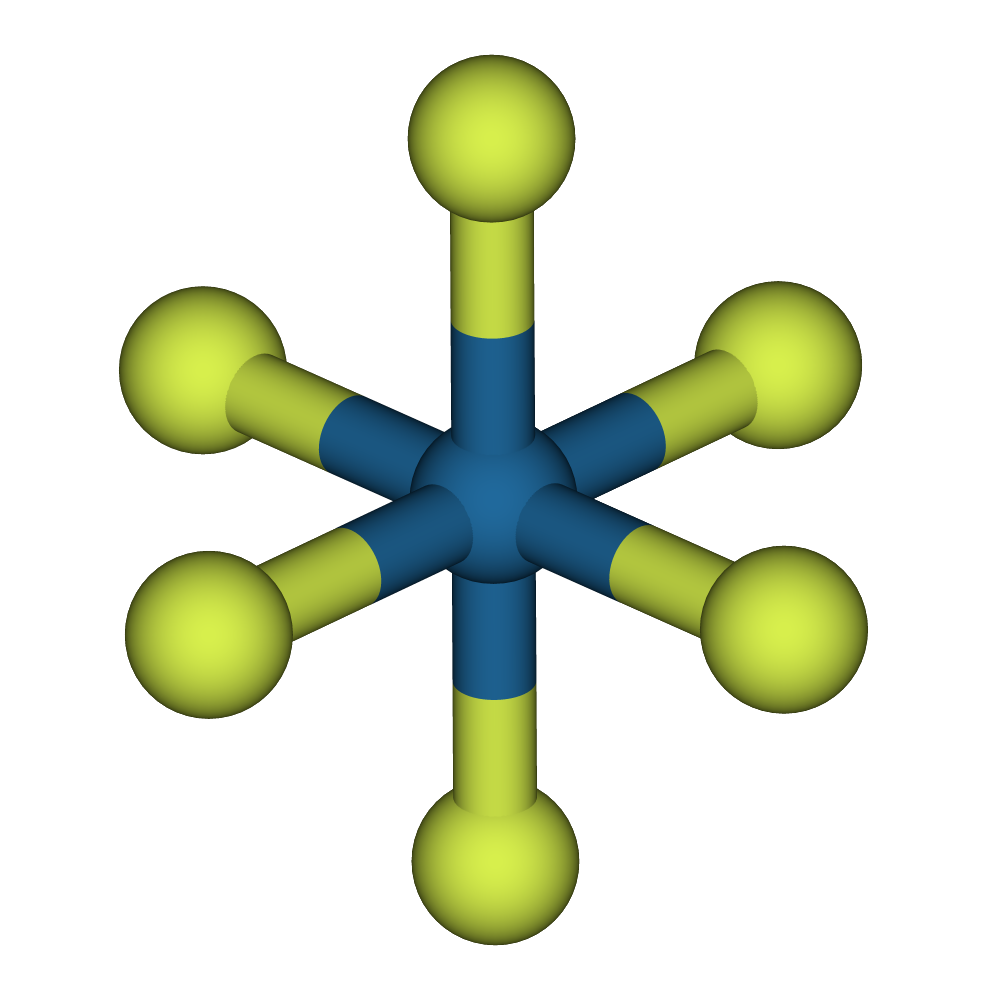

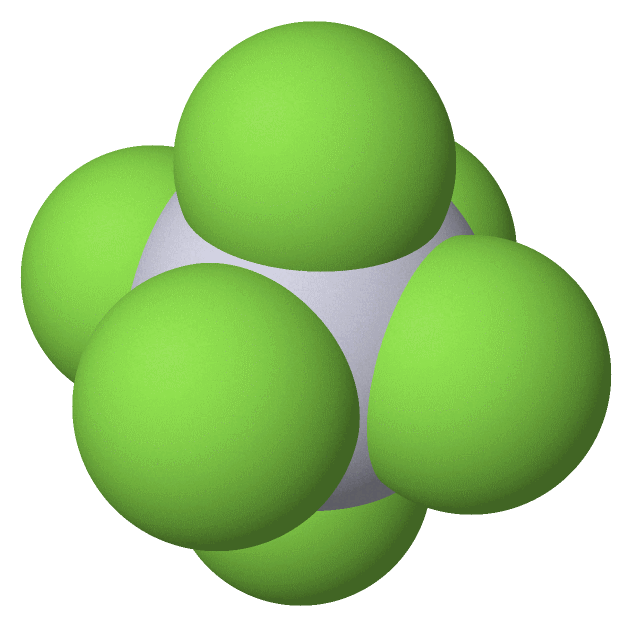

Names
- IUPAC name Platinum(VI) fluoride
- Other names Platinum hexafluoride

Identifiers
CAS Number	13693-05-5
3D model (JSmol)	Interactive image
ChemSpider	2283064
ECHA InfoCard	100.033.816
EC Number	237-214-0
PubChem CID	22238670
UNII	F5G8EJV5MR
CompTox Dashboard (EPA)	DTXSID10160008
- InChI: InChI=1S/6FH.Pt/h6*1H;/q;;;;;;+2/p-6 Key: NHVLQWBIZQMDAU-UHFFFAOYSA-H; InChI=1S/6FH.Pt/h6*1H;/q;;;;;;+2/p-6; Key: NHVLQWBIZQMDAU-UHFFFAOYSA-H
- SMILES: F[Pt](F)(F)(F)(F)F

Properties
Chemical formula	PtF_{6}
Molar mass	309.07 g/mol
Appearance	dark-red crystals
Density	3.83 g/cm^{3}
Melting point	61.3 °C (142.3 °F; 334.4 K)
Boiling point	69.14 °C (156.45 °F; 342.29 K)
Solubility in water	Reacts with water

Structure
Crystal structure	Orthorhombic, oP28
Space group	Pnma, No. 62
Coordination geometry	octahedral (O_{h})
Dipole moment	0

Hazards
- Occupational safety and health (OHS/OSH)
Main hazards	Strong oxidizer
NFPA 704 (fire diamond)	4 0 4 OX

Related compounds
Related compounds	Platinum(IV) fluoride Platinum(V) fluoride
- Except where otherwise noted, data are given for materials in their standard state (at 25 °C [77 °F], 100 kPa). verify (what is ?) Infobox references

Platinum hexafluoride is the chemical compound with the formula PtF_{6}, and is one of seventeen known binary hexafluorides. It is a dark-red volatile solid that forms a red gas. The compound is a unique example of platinum in the +6 oxidation state. With only four d-electrons, it is paramagnetic with a triplet ground state. PtF_{6} is a strong fluorinating agent and one of the strongest oxidants, capable of oxidising xenon and O_{2}. PtF_{6} is octahedral in both the solid state and in the gaseous state. The Pt-F bond lengths are 185 picometers.

== Synthesis ==
PtF_{6} was first prepared by reaction of fluorine with platinum metal. This route remains the method of choice.

Pt + 3 F_{2} → PtF_{6}

PtF_{6} can also be prepared by disproportionation of the pentafluoride (PtF_{5}), with the tetrafluoride (PtF_{4}) as a byproduct. The required PtF_{5} can be obtained by fluorinating PtCl_{2}:

2 PtCl_{2} + 5 F_{2} → 2 PtF_{5} + 2 Cl_{2}
2 PtF_{5} → PtF_{6} + PtF_{4}

== Hexafluoroplatinates ==
Platinum hexafluoride can gain an electron to form the hexafluoroplatinate anion, PtF^{−}_{6}. It is formed by reacting platinum hexafluoride with relatively uncationisable elements and compounds, for example with xenon to form "XePtF_{6}" (actually a mixture of XeFPtF_{5}, XeFPt_{2}F_{11}, and Xe_{2}F_{3}PtF_{6}), known as xenon hexafluoroplatinate. The discovery of this reaction in 1962 proved that noble gases form chemical compounds. Previous to the experiment with xenon, PtF_{6} had been shown to react with oxygen to form [O_{2}]^{+}[PtF_{6}]^{−}, dioxygenyl hexafluoroplatinate.

== See also ==
- Hexafluoride
- Chloroplatinic acid

== General reading ==
- Holleman, A. F.; Wiberg, E. "Inorganic Chemistry" Academic Press: San Diego, 2001. ISBN 0-12-352651-5.
