= Decay technique =

Creating chemicals by radioactive decay

In chemistry, the decay technique is a method to generate chemical species such as radicals, carbocations, and other potentially unstable covalent structures by radioactive decay of other compounds. For example, decay of a tritium-labeled molecule yields an ionized helium atom, which might then break off to leave a cationic molecular fragment.

The technique was developed in 1963 by the Italian chemist Fulvio Cacace at the University of Rome. It has allowed the study of a vast number of otherwise inaccessible compounds and reactions. It has also provided much of our current knowledge about the chemistry of the helium hydride ion [HeH]^{+}.

== Carbocation generation ==
In the basic method, a molecule (R,R′,R″)C−T is prepared where the vacant bond of the desired radical or ion is satisfied by an atom of tritium ^{3}H, the radioactive isotope of hydrogen with mass number 3. As the tritium undergoes beta decay (with a half-life of 12.32 years), it is transformed into an ion of helium-3, creating the cation (R,R′,R″)C−[^{3}He]^{+}.

In the decay, an electron and an antineutrino are ejected at great speed from the tritium nucleus, changing one of the neutrons into a proton with the release of 18,600 electronvolts (eV) of energy. The neutrino escapes the system; the electron is generally captured within a short distance, but far enough away from the site of the decay that it can be considered lost from the molecule. Those two particles carry away most of the released energy, but their departure causes the nucleus to recoil, with about 1.6 eV of energy. This recoil energy is larger than the bond strength of the carbon–helium bond (about 1 eV), so this bond breaks. The helium atom almost always leaves as a neutral ^{3}He, leaving behind the carbocation [(R,R′,R″)C]^{+}.

These events happen very quickly compared to typical molecular relaxation times, so the carbocation is usually created in the same conformation and electronic configuration as the original neutral molecule. For example, decay of tritiated methane, CH_{3}T (R = R′ = R″ = H) produces the carbenium ion H_{3}C^{+} in a tetrahedral conformation, with one of the orbitals having a single unpaired electron and the other three forming a trigonal pyramid. The ion then relaxes to its more favorable trigonal planar form, with release of about 30 kcal/mol of energy—that goes into vibrations and rotation of the ion.

The carbocation then can interact with surrounding molecules in many reactions that cannot be achieved by other means. When formed within a rarefied gas, the carbocation and its reactions can be studied by mass spectrometry techniques. However the technique can be used also in condensed matter (liquids and solids). In liquid phase, the carbocation is initially formed in the same solvation state as the parent molecule, and some reactions may happen before the solvent shells around it have time to rearrange. In a crystalline solid, the cation is formed in the same crystalline site; and the nature, position, and orientation of the other reagent(s) are strictly constrained.

=== Radical formation ===
In a condensed phase, the carbocation can also gain an electron from surrounding molecules, thus becoming an electrically neutral radical. For example, in crystalline naphthalene, a molecule with tritium substituted for hydrogen in the 1 (or 2) position will be turned by decay into a cation with a positive charge at that position. That charge will however be quickly neutralized by an electron transported through the lattice, turning the molecule into the 1-naphthyl (or 2-naphthyl) radical; which are stable, trapped in the solid, below 170 K (−103 °C).

== Persistent bound structures ==
Whereas the carbon–helium-ion bond breaks spontaneously and immediately to yield a carbocation, bonds of other elements to helium are more stable. For example, molecular tritium T_{2} or tritium-hydrogen HT. On decay, these form a stable helium hydride ion [HeH]^{+} (respectively [^{3}HeT]^{+} or [^{3}HeH]^{+}), which is stable enough to persist. This cation is claimed to be the strongest acid known, and will protonate any other molecule it comes in contact with. This is another route to creating cations that are not obtainable in other ways. In particular [HeH]^{+} (or [HeT]^{+}) will protonate methane CH_{4} to the carbonium ion [CH_{5}]^{+} (or [CH_{4}T]^{+}).

Other structures that are expected to be stable when formed by beta-decay of tritium precursors include ^{3}HeLi^{+}, B_{2}H_{5}^{3}He^{+}, and BeH^{3}He^{+} according to theoretical calculations.

=== Other nuclear decay processes ===
Radioisotopic decay of other elements besides tritium can yield other stable covalent structures. For example, the first successful synthesis of the perbromate ion was through beta decay of the selenium-83 atom in selenate:

^{83}SeO^{2−}_{4} → ^{83}BrO^{−}_{4} + β^{−}

Decay of iodine-133 to give xenon is reported as a route to phenylxenonium, and likewise decay of bismuth-210 in a variety of structures is reported as a route to organopolonium structures.

== Practical considerations ==
A major difficulty in using this method in practice is that the energetic electron released by the decay of one atom of tritium can break apart, modify, ionize, or excite hundreds of other molecules in its path. These fragments and ions can further react with the surrounding molecules producing more products. Without special precautions, it would be impossible to distinguish these "radiolytic" products and reactions from the "nucleogenic" ones due to mutation and reactions of the cation [(R,R′,R″)C]^{+}.

The technique developed by Cacace and his team to overcome this problem is to use a starting compound that has at least two tritium atoms substituted for hydrogens, and dilute it in a large amount of an unsubstituted compound. Then the radiolytic products will be all unlabeled, whereas the nucleogenic ones will be still labeled with tritium. The latter then can be reliably extracted, measured, and analyzed, in spite of the much larger number of radiolytic products. The high dilution also ensures that the beta electron will almost never hit another tritiated molecule.

== Scientific literature ==
Many papers have been published by about this technique, chiefly by Cacace and his successors at La Sapienza. An exhaustive survey was provided by M. Speranza in 1993.
