= Helium hydride ion =

Chemical compound; strongest known acid

- Spacefill model of the helium hydride ion

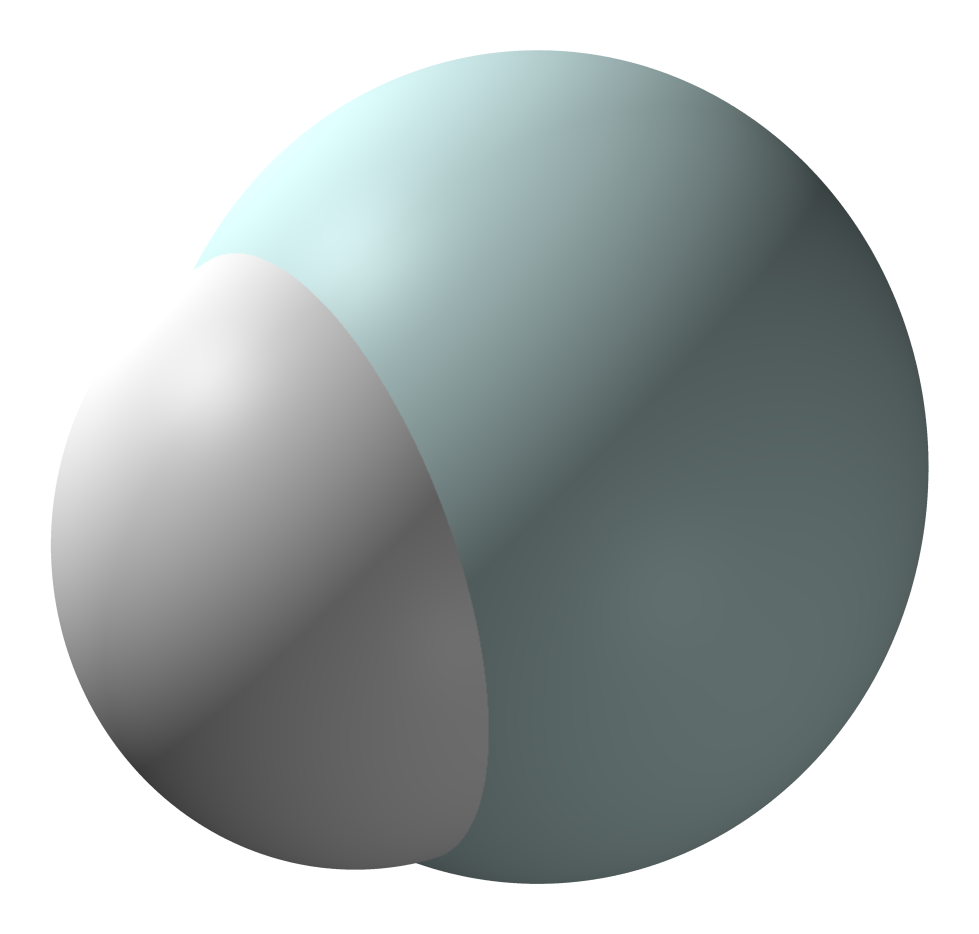

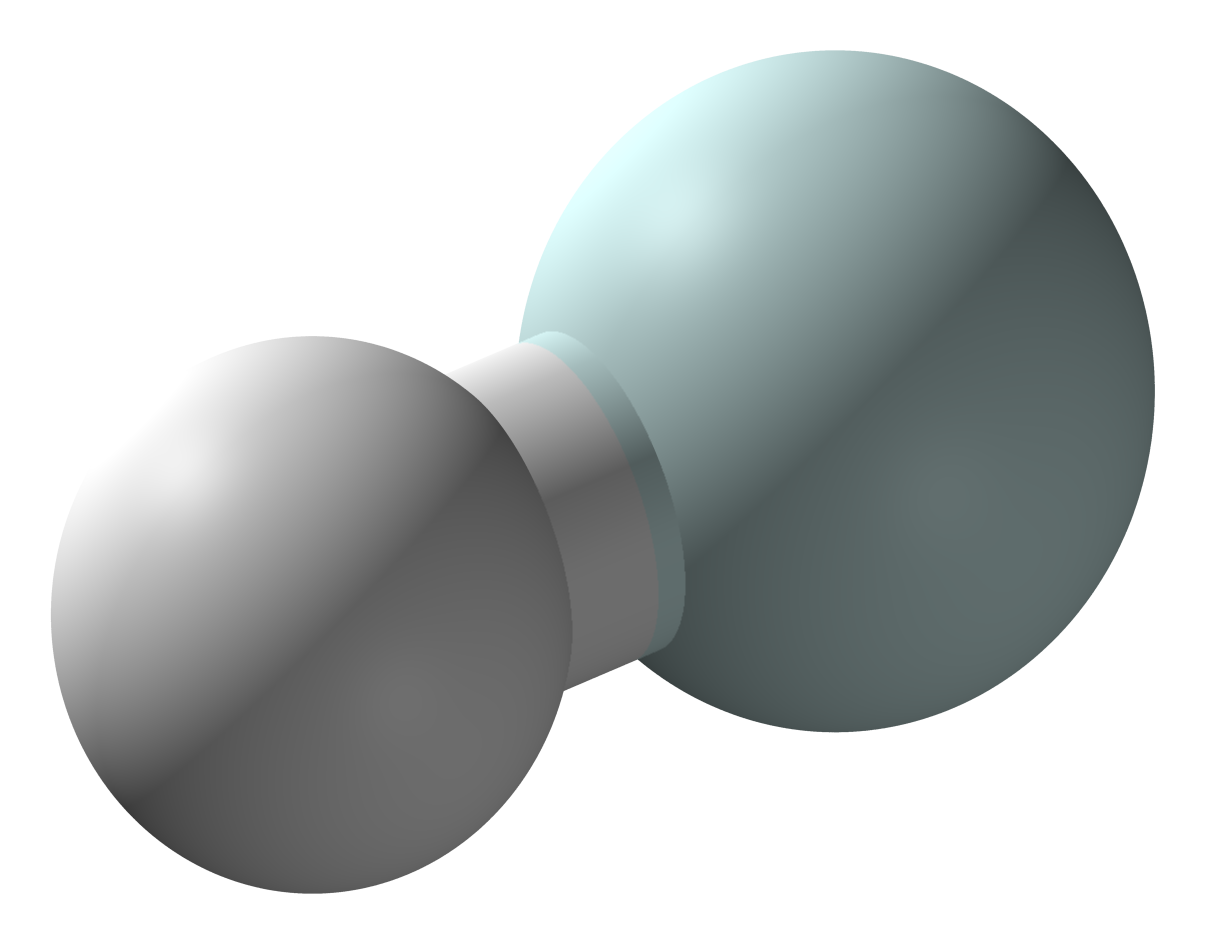

Names
- Systematic IUPAC name Hydridohelium(1+)
- Other names Helonium; Helium hydride

Identifiers
CAS Number	13766-24-0
3D model (JSmol)	Interactive image
ChEBI	CHEBI:33688; CHEBI:33689 neutral excimer
ChemSpider	21106447
Gmelin Reference	2
CompTox Dashboard (EPA)	DTXSID801018818
- InChI: InChI=1S/HHe/h1H/q+1 Key: HSFAAVLNFOAYQX-UHFFFAOYSA-N
- SMILES: [HeH+]

Properties
Chemical formula	HeH^{+}
Molar mass	5.01054 g·mol^{−1}
Conjugate base	Helium

Related compounds
Related compounds	Neonium, Argonium, Kryptonium, Xenonium
- Except where otherwise noted, data are given for materials in their standard state (at 25 °C [77 °F], 100 kPa). Infobox references

The helium hydride ion, hydridohelium(1+) ion, or helonium is a cation (positively charged ion) with chemical formula HeH^{+}. It consists of a helium atom bonded to a hydrogen atom, with one electron removed. It can also be viewed as protonated helium. It is the lightest heteronuclear ion, and is believed to be the first compound formed in the Universe after the Big Bang.

The ion was first produced in a laboratory in 1925. It is stable in isolation, but extremely reactive, and cannot be prepared in bulk, because it would react with any other molecule with which it came into contact. Noted as the strongest known acid—stronger than even fluoroantimonic acid—its occurrence in the interstellar medium had been conjectured since the 1970s, and it was finally detected in April 2019 using the airborne SOFIA telescope.

== Physical properties ==
The helium hydrogen ion is isoelectronic with molecular hydrogen (H_{2}).

Unlike the dihydrogen ion H^{+}_{2}, the helium hydride ion has a permanent dipole moment, which makes its spectrum easier to characterize. The calculated dipole moment of HeH^{+} is 2.26 or 2.84 D. The electron density in the ion is higher around the helium nucleus than the hydrogen. 80% of the electron charge is closer to the helium nucleus than to the hydrogen nucleus.

Spectroscopic detection is hampered, because one of its most prominent spectral lines, at 149.14 μm, coincides with a doublet of spectral lines belonging to the methylidyne radical ⫶CH.

The length of the covalent bond in the ion is 0.772 Å or 77.2 pm.

=== Isotopologues ===
The helium hydride ion has six relatively stable isotopologues, that differ in the isotopes of the two elements, and hence in the total atomic mass number (A) and the total number of neutrons (N) in the two nuclei:

- [^{3}He^{1}H]^{+} or [^{3}HeH]^{+} (A = 4, N = 1)
- [^{3}He^{2}H]^{+} or [^{3}HeD]^{+} (A = 5, N = 2)
- [^{3}He^{3}H]^{+} or [^{3}HeT]^{+} (A = 6, N = 3; radioactive)
- [^{4}He^{1}H]^{+} or [^{4}HeH]^{+} (A = 5, N = 2)
- [^{4}He^{2}H]^{+} or [^{4}HeD]^{+} (A = 6, N = 3)
- [^{4}He^{3}H]^{+} or [^{4}HeT]^{+} (A = 7, N = 4; radioactive)

They all have three protons and two electrons. The first three are generated by radioactive decay of tritium in the molecules HT = ^{1}H^{3}H, DT = ^{2}H^{3}H, and T_{2} = ^{3}H_{2}, respectively. The last three can be generated by ionizing the appropriate isotopologue of H_{2} in the presence of helium-4.

The following isotopologues of the helium hydride ion, of the dihydrogen ion H^{+}_{2}, and of the trihydrogen ion H^{+}_{3} have the same total atomic mass number A:

- [^{3}HeH]^{+}, [D_{2}]^{+}, [TH]^{+}, [DH_{2}]^{+} (A = 4)
- [^{3}HeD]^{+}, [^{4}HeH]^{+}, [DT]^{+}, [TH_{2}]^{+}, [D_{2}H]^{+} (A = 5)
- [^{3}HeT]^{+}, [^{4}HeD]^{+}, [T_{2}]^{+}, [TDH]^{+}, [D_{3}]^{+} (A = 6)
- [^{4}HeT]^{+}, [TD_{2}]^{+}, [T_{2}H]^{+} (A = 7)

The masses in each row above are not equal, though, because the binding energies in the nuclei are different.

=== Neutral molecule ===
Unlike the helium hydride ion, the neutral helium hydride molecule HeH is not stable in the ground state. However, it does exist in an excited state as an excimer (HeH*), and its spectrum was first observed in the mid-1980s.

The neutral molecule is the first entry in the Gmelin database.

== Chemical properties and reactions ==
=== Preparation ===
Since HeH^{+} reacts with every substance, it cannot be stored in any container. As a result, its chemistry must be studied by creating it in situ.

Reactions with organic substances can be studied by substituting hydrogen in the desired organic compound with tritium. The decay of tritium to ^{3}He^{+} followed by its extraction of a hydrogen atom from the compound yields ^{3}HeH^{+}, which is then surrounded by the organic material and will in turn react.

TR → ^{3}He^{+} + R^{•} (beta decay)
^{3}He^{+} + HR → ^{3}HeH^{+} + R^{•} (hydrogen abstraction)

=== Acidity ===
HeH^{+} cannot be prepared in a condensed phase, as it would donate a proton to any anion, molecule or atom that it came in contact with. It has been shown to protonate O_{2}, NH_{3}, SO_{2}, H_{2}O, and CO_{2}, giving HO^{+}_{2}, NH^{+}_{4}, HSO^{+}_{2}, H_{3}O^{+}, and HCO^{+}_{2} respectively. Other molecules such as nitric oxide, nitrogen dioxide, nitrous oxide, hydrogen sulfide, methane, acetylene, ethylene, ethane, methanol and acetonitrile react, but subsequently break up due to the large amount of energy produced.

In fact, HeH^{+} is the strongest known acid, with a proton affinity of 177.8 kJ/mol, or a pK_{a} of −63.

=== Other helium-hydrogen ions ===
Additional helium atoms can attach to HeH^{+} to form larger clusters such as He_{2}H^{+}, He_{3}H^{+}, He_{4}H^{+}, He_{5}H^{+} and He_{6}H^{+}.

The dihelium hydride cation, He_{2}H^{+}, is formed by the reaction of dihelium cation with molecular hydrogen:

He^{+}_{2} + H_{2} → He_{2}H^{+} + H

It is a linear ion with hydrogen in the centre.

The hexahelium hydride ion, He_{6}H^{+}, is particularly stable.

Other helium hydride ions are known or have been studied theoretically. Helium dihydride ion, or dihydridohelium(1+), HeH^{+}_{2}, has been observed using microwave spectroscopy. It has a calculated binding energy of 25.1 kJ/mol, while trihydridohelium(1+), HeH^{+}_{3}, has a calculated binding energy of 0.42 kJ/mol.

== History ==
=== Discovery in ionization experiments ===
Hydridohelium(1+), specifically [^{4}He^{1}H]^{+}, was first detected indirectly in 1925 by T. R. Hogness and E. G. Lunn. They were injecting protons of known energy into a rarefied mixture of hydrogen and helium, in order to study the formation of hydrogen ions like H^{+}, H^{+}_{2} and H^{+}_{3}. They observed that H^{+}_{3} appeared at the same beam energy (16 eV) as H^{+}_{2}, and its concentration increased with pressure much more than that of the other two ions. From these data, they concluded that the H^{+}_{2} ions were transferring a proton to molecules that they collided with, including helium.

In 1933, K. Bainbridge used mass spectrometry to compare the masses of the ions [^{4}He^{1}H]^{+} (helium hydride ion) and [^{2}H_{2}^{1}H]^{+} (twice-deuterated trihydrogen ion) in order to obtain an accurate measurement of the atomic mass of deuterium relative to that of helium. Both ions have 3 protons, 2 neutrons, and 2 electrons. He also compared [^{4}He^{2}H]^{+} (helium deuteride ion) with [^{2}H_{3}]^{+} (trideuterium ion), both with 3 protons and 3 neutrons.

=== Early theoretical studies ===
The first attempt to compute the structure of the HeH^{+} ion (specifically, [^{4}He^{1}H]^{+}) by quantum mechanical theory was made by J. Beach in 1936. Improved computations were sporadically published over the next decades.

=== Tritium decay methods in chemistry ===
H. Schwartz observed in 1955 that the decay of the tritium molecule T_{2} = ^{3}H_{2} should generate the helium hydride ion [^{3}HeT]^{+} with high probability.

In 1963, F. Cacace at the Sapienza University of Rome conceived the decay technique for preparing and studying organic radicals and carbenium ions. In a variant of that technique, exotic species like methanium are produced by reacting organic compounds with the [^{3}HeT]^{+} that is produced by the decay of T_{2} that is mixed with the desired reagents. Much of what we know about the chemistry of [HeH]^{+} came through this technique.

=== Implications for neutrino mass experiments ===
In 1980, V. Lubimov (Lyubimov) at the ITEP laboratory in Moscow claimed to have detected a mildly significant rest mass (30 ± 16) eV for the neutrino, by analyzing the energy spectrum of the β decay of tritium. The claim was disputed, and several other groups set out to check it by studying the decay of molecular tritium T_{2}. It was known that some of the energy released by that decay would be diverted to the excitation of the decay products, including [^{3}HeT]^{+}; and this phenomenon could be a significant source of error in that experiment. This observation motivated numerous efforts to precisely compute the expected energy states of that ion in order to reduce the uncertainty of those measurements. Many have improved the computations since then, and now there is quite good agreement between computed and experimental properties; including for the isotopologues [^{4}He^{2}H]^{+}, [^{3}He^{1}H]^{+}, and [^{3}He^{2}H]^{+}.

=== Spectral predictions and detection ===
In 1956, M. Cantwell predicted theoretically that the spectrum of vibrations of that ion should be observable in the infrared; and the spectra of the deuterium and common hydrogen isotopologues ([^{3}HeD]^{+} and [^{3}He^{1}H]^{+}) should lie closer to visible light and hence easier to observe. The first detection of the spectrum of [^{4}He^{1}H]^{+} was made by D. Tolliver and others in 1979, at wavenumbers between 1,700 and 1,900 cm^{−1}. In 1982, P. Bernath and T. Amano detected nine infrared lines between 2,164 and 3,158 waves per cm.

=== Interstellar space ===
HeH^{+} has been conjectured since the 1970s to exist in the interstellar medium. Its first detection, in the nebula NGC 7027, was reported in an article published in the journal Nature in April 2019.

== Natural occurrence ==
=== From decay of tritium ===
The helium hydride ion is formed during the decay of tritium in the molecule HT or tritium molecule T_{2}. Although excited by the recoil from the beta decay, the molecule remains bound together.

=== Interstellar medium ===
It is believed to be the first compound to have formed in the universe, and is of fundamental importance in understanding the chemistry of the early universe. This is because hydrogen and helium were almost the only types of atoms formed in Big Bang nucleosynthesis. The primordial gas is expected to contain HeH^{+}, which could influence its cooling rate, star formation, and subsequent stellar evolution. The high dipole moment of HeH^{+} is expected to affect the atmospheric opacity of zero-metallicity stars. HeH^{+} is also thought to be an important constituent of the atmospheres of helium-rich white dwarfs, where it increases the opacity of the gas and causes the star to cool more slowly.

HeH^{+} could be formed in the cooling gas behind dissociative shocks in dense interstellar clouds, such as the shocks caused by stellar winds, supernovae and outflowing material from young stars. If the speed of the shock is greater than about 90 kilometres per second (56 mi/s), quantities large enough to detect might be formed. If detected, the emissions from HeH^{+} would then be useful tracers of the shock.

Several locations had been suggested as possible places HeH^{+} might be detected. These included cool helium stars, H II regions, and dense planetary nebulae, like NGC 7027, where, in April 2019, HeH^{+} was reported to have been detected.

== See also ==
- Argonium – Chemical compound
- Dihydrogen cation – Molecular ion
- Trihydrogen cation – Polyatomic ion (H3, charge +1)
