= Argonium =

Chemical compound

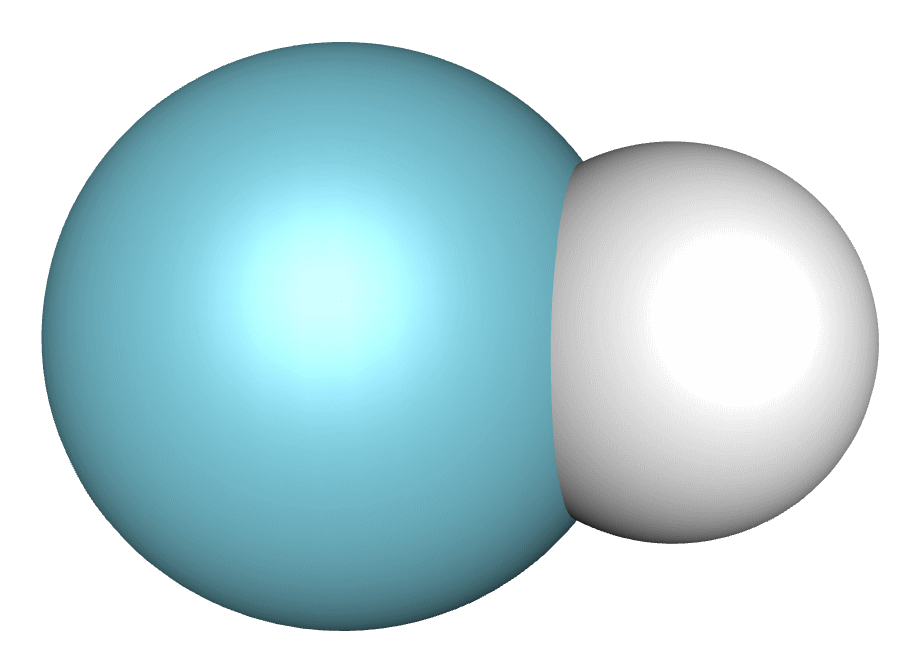

Names
- IUPAC name Argonium ion
- Other names Hydridoargon(1+) argon hydride cation protonated argon

Identifiers
CAS Number	12254-68-1
3D model (JSmol)	Interactive image
CompTox Dashboard (EPA)	DTXSID801316319
- InChI: InChI=1S/ArH/h1H/q+1 Key: TVQSUVFYDVJWLI-UHFFFAOYSA-N
- SMILES: [ArH+]

Properties
Chemical formula	ArH^{+}
Molar mass	40.956 g·mol^{−1}
Conjugate base	Argon

Related compounds
Related compounds	Helium hydride ion, Neonium, Kryptonium, Xenonium
- Except where otherwise noted, data are given for materials in their standard state (at 25 °C [77 °F], 100 kPa). Infobox references

Argonium (also called the argon hydride cation, the hydridoargon(1+) ion, or protonated argon; chemical formula ArH^{+}) is a cation combining a proton and an argon atom. It can be made in an electric discharge, and was the first noble gas molecular ion to be found in interstellar space.

== Properties ==
Argonium is isoelectronic with hydrogen chloride. Its dipole moment is 2.18 D for the ground state. The binding energy is 369 kJ mol^{−1} (3.9 eV). This is smaller than that of H^{+}_{3} and many other protonated species, but more than that of H^{+}_{2}.

Rotationless radiative lifetimes of different vibrational states vary with isotope and become shorter for the more rapid high-energy vibrations:

Lifetimes (ms)
v	ArH^{+}	ArD^{+}
1	2.28	9.09
2	1.20	4.71
3	0.85	3.27
4	0.64	2.55
5	0.46	2.11

The force constant in the bond is calculated at 3.88 μN/nm^{2}.

== Reactions ==
The proton affinity of argon is 369 kJ/mol, less than that of dihydrogen. This makes ArH^{+} a superacid capable of exothermic protonation of H_{2} and various neutral free radical species.

- ArH^{+} + H_{2} → Ar + H^{+}_{3}
- ArH^{+} + C → Ar + CH^{+}
- ArH^{+} + N → Ar + NH^{+}
- ArH^{+} + O → Ar + OH^{+}
- ArH^{+} + CO → Ar + COH^{+}

But the reverse reaction happens:

- Ar + H^{+}_{2} → ArH^{+} + H.
- Ar + H^{+}_{3} → *ArH^{+} + H_{2}

Ar^{+} + H_{2} has a cross section of 10^{−18} m^{2} for low energy. It has a steep drop off for energies over 100 eV Ar + H^{+}_{2} has a cross sectional area of 6×10^{−19} m^{2} for low energy H^{+}_{2}, but when the energy exceeds 10 eV yield reduces, and more Ar^{+} and H_{2} is produced instead.

Ar + H^{+}_{3} has a maximum yield of ArH^{+} for energies between 0.75 and 1 eV with a cross section of 5×10^{−20} m^{2}. 0.6 eV is needed to make the reaction proceed forward. Over 4 eV more Ar^{+} and H starts to appear.

Argonium is also produced from Ar^{+} ions produced by cosmic rays and X-rays from neutral argon.

- Ar^{+} + H_{2} → *ArH^{+} + H 1.49 eV

When ArH^{+} encounters an electron, dissociative recombination can occur, but it is extremely slow for lower energy electrons, allowing ArH^{+} to survive for a much longer time than many other similar protonated cations.

- ArH^{+} + e^{−} → Ar + H

Because ionisation potential of argon atoms is lower than that of the hydrogen molecule (in contrast to that of helium or neon), the argon ion reacts with molecular hydrogen, but for helium and neon ions, they will strip an electron from a hydrogen molecule.

- Ar^{+} + H_{2} → ArH^{+} + H
- Ne^{+} + H_{2} → Ne + H^{+} + H (dissociative charge transfer)
- He^{+} + H_{2} → He + H^{+} + H

== Spectrum ==
Artificial ArH^{+} made from earthly argon contains mostly the isotope ^{40}Ar rather than the cosmically abundant ^{36}Ar. Artificially it is made by an electric discharge through an argon–hydrogen mixture. Brault and Davis were the first to detect the molecule using infrared spectroscopy to observe vibration–rotation bands.

Far infrared spectrum of ^{40}Ar^{1}H^{+}		^{36}Ar	^{38}Ar
Transition	observed frequency		
J	GHz		
1←0	615.8584	617.525	615.85815
2←1	1231.2712	1234.602	
3←2	1845.7937		
4←3	2458.9819		
5←4	3080.3921		
6←5	3679.5835		
7←6	4286.1150		
21←20	12258.483		
22←21	12774.366		
23←22	13281.119		

The UV spectrum has two absorption points resulting in the ion breaking up. The 11.2 eV conversion to the B^{1}Π state has a low dipole and so does not absorb much. A 15.8 eV to a repulsive A^{1}Σ^{+} state is at a shorter wavelength than the Lyman limit, and so there are very few photons around to do this in space.

== Natural occurrence ==
ArH^{+} occurs in interstellar diffuse atomic hydrogen gas. For argonium to form, the fraction of molecular hydrogen H_{2} must be in the range 0.0001 to 0.001. Different molecular ions form in correlation with different concentrations of H_{2}. Argonium is detected by its absorption lines at 617.525 GHz (J = 1→0), and 1234.602 GHz (J = 2→1). These lines are due to the isotopolog ^{36}Ar^{1}H^{+} undergoing rotational transitions. The lines have been detected in the direction of the galactic centre SgrB2(M) and SgrB2(N), G34.26+0.15, W31C (G10.62−0.39), W49(N), and W51e, however where absorption lines are observed, argonium is not likely to be in the microwave source, but instead in the gas in front of it. Emission lines are found in the Crab Nebula.

In the Crab Nebula ArH^{+} occurs in several spots revealed by emission lines. The strongest place is in the Southern Filament. This is also the place with the strongest concentration of Ar^{+} and Ar^{2+} ions. The column density of ArH^{+} in the Crab Nebula is between 10^{12} and 10^{13} atoms per square centimeter. Possible the energy required to excite the ions so that then can emit comes from collisions with electrons or hydrogen molecules. Towards the Milky Way centre the column density of ArH^{+} is around 2×10^{13} cm^{−2}.

Two isotopologs of argonium ^{36}ArH^{+} and ^{38}ArH^{+} are known to be in a distant unnamed galaxy with a redshift of z = 0.88582 (7.5 billion light years away) which is on the line of sight to the blazar PKS 1830−211.

Electron neutralization and destruction of argonium outcompletes the formation rate in space if the H_{2} concentration is below 1 in 10^{−4}.

== History ==
Using the McMath solar Fourier transform spectrometer at Kitt Peak National Observatory, James W. Brault and Sumner P. Davis observed ArH^{+} vibration-rotation infrared lines for the first time. J. W. C. Johns also observed the infrared spectrum.

== Use ==
Argon facilitates the reaction of tritium (T_{2}) with double bonds in fatty acids by forming an ArT^{+} (tritium argonium) intermediate. When gold is sputtered with an argon-hydrogen plasma, the actual displacement of gold is done by ArH^{+}.
