= Neon =

Neon, _{10}Ne
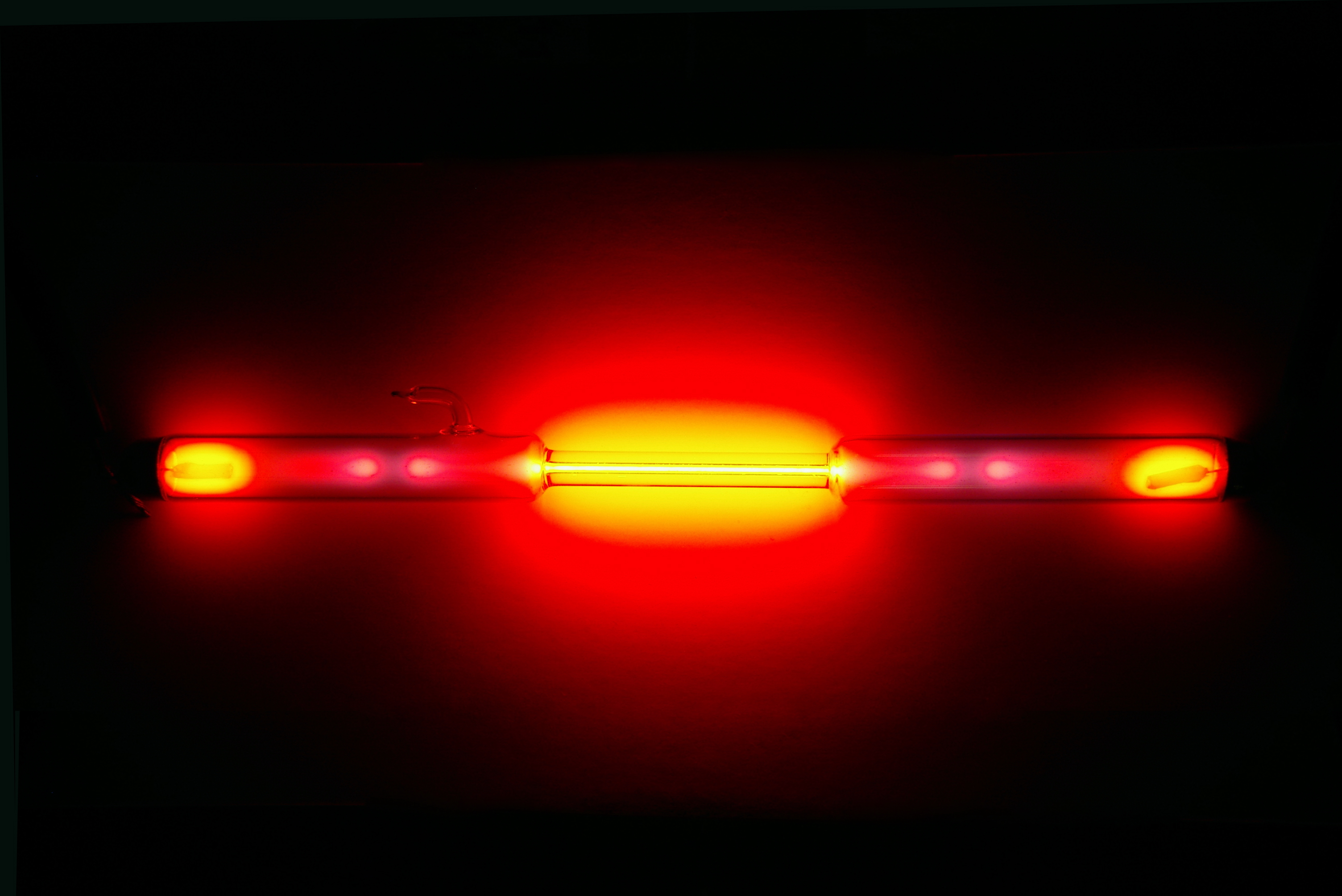

Neon
- Appearance: colorless gas exhibiting an orange-red glow when placed in an electric field

Standard atomic weight A_{r}°(Ne)
- 20.1797±0.0006; 20.180±0.001 (abridged)

Neon in the periodic table
Hydrogen																															Helium
Lithium	Beryllium																									Boron	Carbon	Nitrogen	Oxygen	Fluorine	Neon
Sodium	Magnesium																									Aluminium	Silicon	Phosphorus	Sulfur	Chlorine	Argon
Potassium	Calcium															Scandium	Titanium	Vanadium	Chromium	Manganese	Iron	Cobalt	Nickel	Copper	Zinc	Gallium	Germanium	Arsenic	Selenium	Bromine	Krypton
Rubidium	Strontium															Yttrium	Zirconium	Niobium	Molybdenum	Technetium	Ruthenium	Rhodium	Palladium	Silver	Cadmium	Indium	Tin	Antimony	Tellurium	Iodine	Xenon
Caesium	Barium	Lanthanum	Cerium	Praseodymium	Neodymium	Promethium	Samarium	Europium	Gadolinium	Terbium	Dysprosium	Holmium	Erbium	Thulium	Ytterbium	Lutetium	Hafnium	Tantalum	Tungsten	Rhenium	Osmium	Iridium	Platinum	Gold	Mercury (element)	Thallium	Lead	Bismuth	Polonium	Astatine	Radon
Francium	Radium	Actinium	Thorium	Protactinium	Uranium	Neptunium	Plutonium	Americium	Curium	Berkelium	Californium	Einsteinium	Fermium	Mendelevium	Nobelium	Lawrencium	Rutherfordium	Dubnium	Seaborgium	Bohrium	Hassium	Meitnerium	Darmstadtium	Roentgenium	Copernicium	Nihonium	Flerovium	Moscovium	Livermorium	Tennessine	Oganesson
He
↑
Ne
↓
Ar
fluorine ← neon → sodium
- Atomic number (Z): 10
- Group: group 18 (noble gases)
- Period: period 2
- Block: p-block
- Electron configuration: [He] 2s^{2} 2p^{6}
- Electrons per shell: 2, 8

Physical properties
- Phase at STP: gas
- Melting point: 24.56 K (−248.59 °C, −415.46 °F)
- Boiling point: 27.104 K (−246.046 °C, −410.883 °F)
- Density (at STP): 0.9002 g/L
- when liquid (at b.p.): 1.207 g/cm^{3}
- Triple point: 24.556 K, 43.37 kPa
- Critical point: 44.4918 K, 2.7686 MPa
- Heat of fusion: 0.335 kJ/mol
- Heat of vaporization: 1.71 kJ/mol
- Molar heat capacity: 20.79 J/(mol·K)
- Specific heat capacity: 1030.228 J/(kg·K)
Vapor pressure
P (Pa)	1	10	100	1 k	10 k	100 k
at T (K)	12	13	15	18	21	27

Atomic properties
- Oxidation states: common: (none); 0
- Ionization energies: 1st: 2080.7 kJ/mol; 2nd: 3952.3 kJ/mol; 3rd: 6122 kJ/mol; (more)
- Covalent radius: 58 pm
- Van der Waals radius: 154 pm
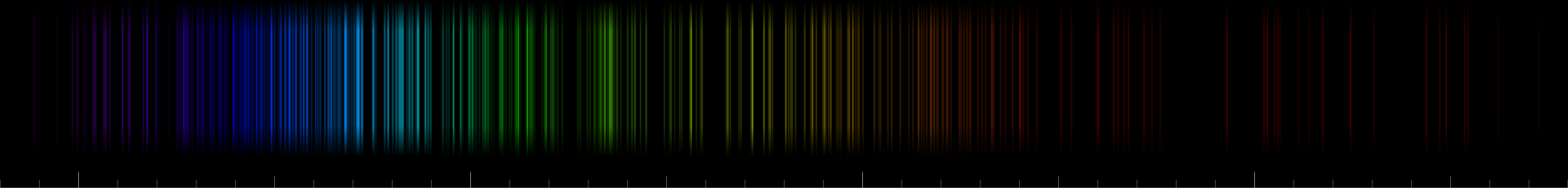
- Spectral lines of neon

Other properties
- Natural occurrence: primordial
- Crystal structure: face-centered cubic (fcc) (cF4)
- Lattice constant: a = 453.77 pm (at triple point)
- Thermal conductivity: 49.1×10^{−3} W/(m⋅K)
- Magnetic ordering: diamagnetic
- Molar magnetic susceptibility: −6.74×10^{−6} cm^{3}/mol (298 K)
- Bulk modulus: 654 GPa
- Speed of sound: 435 m/s (gas, at 0 °C)
- CAS Number: 7440-01-9

History
- Naming: from the Greek word νέον, meaning 'new'
- Prediction: William Ramsay (1897)
- Discovery and first isolation: William Ramsay & Morris Travers (1898)

Isotopes of neon
Main isotopes			Decay	
Isotope	abundance	half-life (t_{1/2})	mode	product
^{20}Ne	90.48%	stable		
^{21}Ne	0.27%	stable		
^{22}Ne	9.25%	stable		

Neon is a chemical element; it has the symbol Ne and the atomic number 10. It is the second noble gas in the periodic table. Neon is a colorless, odorless, inert monatomic gas under standard conditions, with approximately two-thirds the density of air.

Neon was discovered in 1898 alongside krypton and xenon, identified as one of the three remaining rare inert elements in dry air after the removal of nitrogen, oxygen, argon, and carbon dioxide. Its discovery was marked by the distinctive bright red emission spectrum it exhibited, leading to its immediate recognition as a new element. The name neon originates from the Greek word νέον, a neuter singular form of νέος (neos), meaning 'new'. Neon is a chemically inert gas; although neon compounds do exist, they are primarily ionic molecules or fragile molecules held together by van der Waals forces.

The synthesis of most neon in the cosmos resulted from the nuclear fusion within stars of oxygen and helium through the alpha-capture process. Despite its abundant presence in the universe and Solar System—ranking fifth in cosmic abundance following hydrogen, helium, oxygen, and carbon—neon is comparatively scarce on Earth. It constitutes about 18.2 ppm of Earth's atmospheric volume and a lesser fraction in the Earth's crust. The high volatility of neon and its inability to form compounds that would anchor it to solids explain its limited presence on Earth and the inner terrestrial planets. Neon's high volatility facilitated its escape from planetesimals under the early Solar System's nascent Sun's warmth.

Neon's notable applications include its use in low-voltage neon glow lamps, high-voltage discharge tubes, and neon advertising signs, where it emits a distinct reddish-orange glow. This same red emission line is responsible for the characteristic red light of helium–neon lasers. Although neon has some applications in plasma tubes and as a refrigerant, its commercial uses are relatively limited. It is primarily obtained through the fractional distillation of liquid air, making it significantly more expensive than helium due to air being its sole source.

== History ==
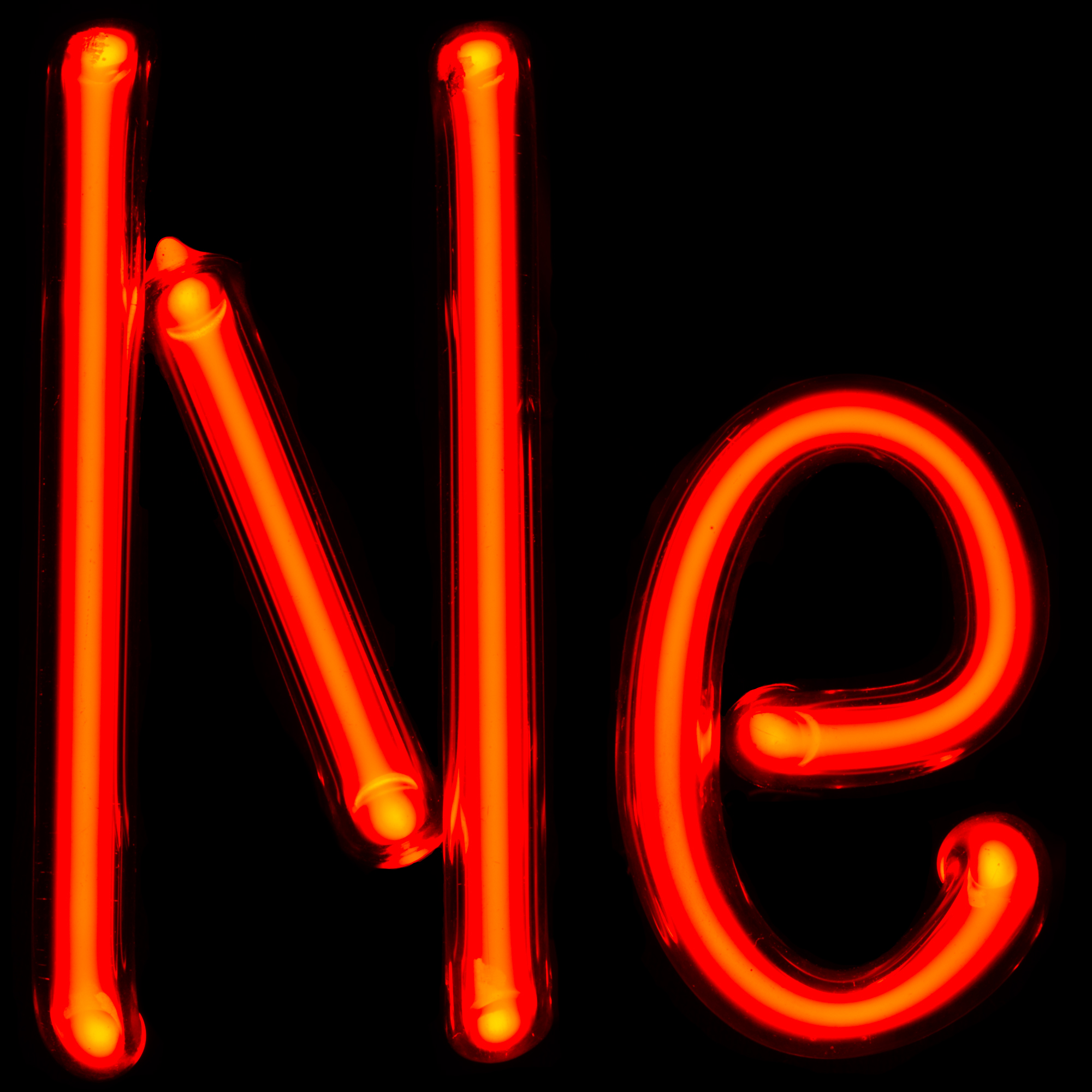
Neon gas-discharge lamps forming neon's element symbol

Neon was discovered in 1898 by the British chemists Sir William Ramsay (1852–1916) and Morris Travers (1872–1961) in London. Neon was discovered when Ramsay chilled a sample of air until it became a liquid, then warmed the liquid and captured the gases as they boiled off. The gases nitrogen, oxygen, and argon had been identified, but the remaining gases were isolated in roughly their order of abundance, in a six-week period beginning at the end of May 1898. The first remaining gas to be identified was krypton; the next, after krypton had been removed, was a gas which gave a brilliant red light under spectroscopic discharge. This gas, identified in June, was named "neon", the Greek analogue of the Latin novum ('new') suggested by Ramsay's son. The characteristic brilliant red-orange color emitted by gaseous neon when excited electrically was noted immediately. Travers later wrote: "the blaze of crimson light from the tube told its own story and was a sight to dwell upon and never forget."

A second gas was also reported along with neon, having approximately the same density as argon but with a different spectrum – Ramsay and Travers named it metargon. However, the subsequent spectroscopic analysis revealed it to be argon contaminated with carbon monoxide. Finally, the same team discovered xenon by the same process, in September 1898.

Neon's scarcity precluded its prompt application for lighting along the lines of Moore tubes, which used nitrogen and which were commercialized in the early 1900s. After 1902, Georges Claude's company Air Liquide produced industrial quantities of neon as a byproduct of his air-liquefaction business. In December 1910 Claude demonstrated modern neon lighting based on a sealed tube of neon. Claude tried briefly to sell neon tubes for indoor domestic lighting, due to their intensity, but the market failed because homeowners objected to the color. In 1912, Claude's associate began selling neon discharge tubes as eye-catching advertising signs and was instantly more successful. Neon tubes were introduced to the U.S. in 1923 with two large neon signs bought by a Los Angeles Packard car dealership. The glow and arresting red color made neon advertising completely different from the competition. The intense color and vibrancy of neon equated with American society at the time, suggesting a "century of progress" and transforming cities into sensational new environments filled with radiating advertisements and "electro-graphic architecture".

Neon played a role in the basic understanding of the nature of atoms in 1913, when J. J. Thomson, as part of his exploration into the composition of canal rays, channeled streams of neon ions through a magnetic and an electric field and measured the deflection of the streams with a photographic plate. Thomson observed two separate patches of light on the photographic plate (see image), which suggested two different parabolas of deflection. Thomson eventually concluded that some of the atoms in the neon gas were of higher mass than the rest. Though not understood at the time by Thomson, this was the first discovery of isotopes of stable atoms. Thomson's device was a crude version of the instrument we now term a mass spectrometer.

== Isotopes ==
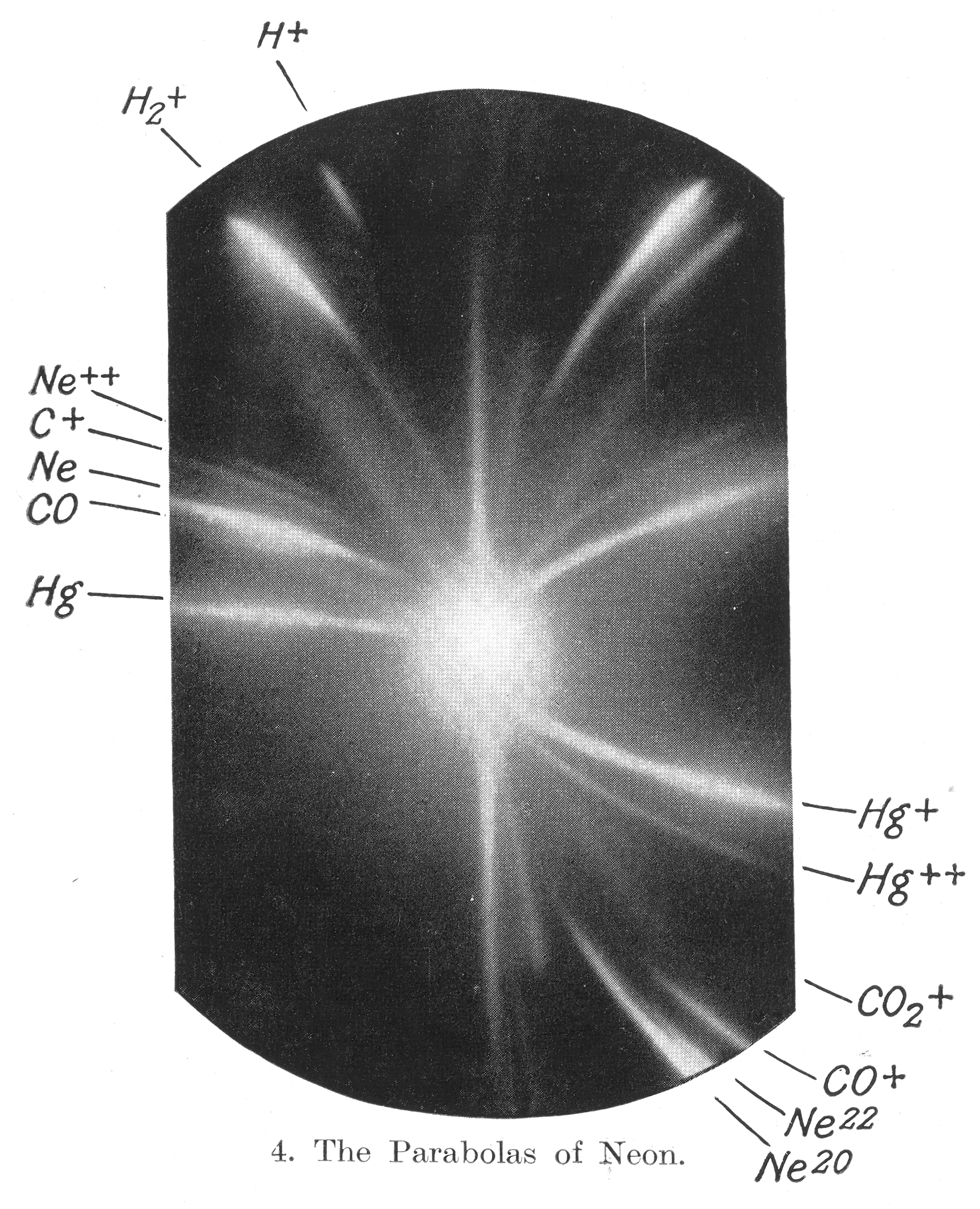
The first evidence for isotopes of a stable element was provided in 1913 by experiments on neon plasma. In the bottom right corner of J. J. Thomson's photographic plate are the separate impact marks for the two isotopes neon-20 and neon-22.

Neon has three stable isotopes: ^{20}Ne (90.48%), ^{21}Ne (0.27%) and ^{22}Ne (9.25%). ^{21}Ne and ^{22}Ne are partly primordial and partly nucleogenic (i.e. made by nuclear reactions of other nuclides with neutrons or other particles in the environment) and their variations in natural abundance are well understood. In contrast, ^{20}Ne (the chief primordial isotope made in stellar nucleosynthesis) is not known to be nucleogenic or radiogenic, except from the decay of oxygen-20, which is produced in very rare cases of cluster decay by thorium-228. The causes of the variation of ^{20}Ne in the Earth have thus been hotly debated.

The principal nuclear reactions generating nucleogenic neon isotopes start from ^{24}Mg and ^{25}Mg, which produce ^{21}Ne and ^{22}Ne respectively, after neutron capture and immediate emission of an alpha particle. The neutrons that produce the reactions are mostly produced by secondary spallation reactions from alpha particles, in turn derived from uranium-series decay chains. The net result yields a trend towards lower ^{20}Ne/^{22}Ne and higher ^{21}Ne/^{22}Ne ratios observed in uranium-rich rocks such as granites.

In addition, isotopic analysis of exposed terrestrial rocks has demonstrated the cosmogenic (cosmic ray) production of ^{21}Ne. This isotope is generated by spallation reactions on magnesium, sodium, silicon, and aluminium. By analyzing all three isotopes, the cosmogenic component can be resolved from magmatic neon and nucleogenic neon. This suggests that neon will be a useful tool in determining cosmic exposure ages of surface rocks and meteorites.

Neon in solar wind contains a higher proportion of ^{20}Ne than nucleogenic and cosmogenic sources. Neon content observed in samples of volcanic gases and diamonds is also enriched in ^{20}Ne, suggesting a primordial, possibly solar origin.

== Characteristics ==
Neon is the second-lightest noble gas, after helium. Like other noble gases, neon is colorless and odorless. It glows reddish-orange in a vacuum discharge tube. It has over 40 times the refrigerating capacity (per unit volume) of liquid helium and three times that of liquid hydrogen. In most applications it is a less expensive refrigerant than helium. Despite helium surpassing neon in terms of ionization energy, neon is theorized to be the chemically least reactive of all the elements, even less so than the former. Multiple computational studies suggest that helium can form stable chemical species under extreme conditions. The helium hydride ion HeH⁺ has been experimentally observed, and high-pressure solids such as Na_{2}He have also been confirmed. Additionally, theoretical works predict that helium hydride fluoride (HHeF), a neutral compound from HeH^{+} could be stable under extreme pressure, whereas the analogous neon compound HNeF appears unbound and therefore nonexistent. In contrast, no stable neutral or covalent neon compounds are known to exist under any pressure or temperature. While a neon-containing anion complex [B_{12}(CN)_{11}Ne]^{-} has been predicted theoretically, its existence has yet to be proven experimentally, leaving neon as the only noble gas for which no compounds have been definitively confirmed to exist.

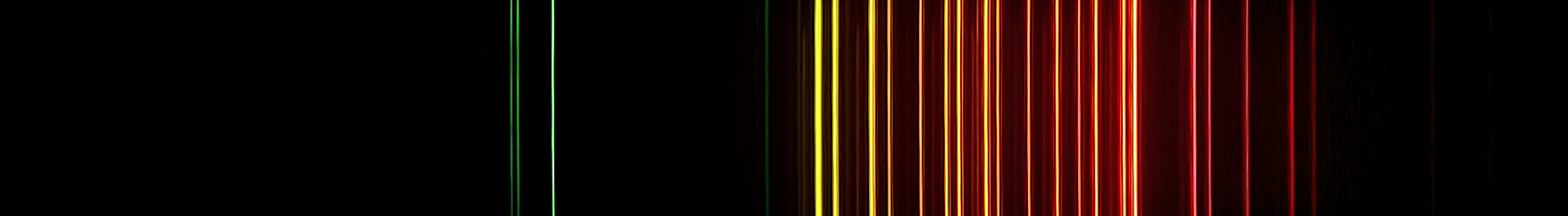
The emission spectrum of neon shows individual wavelengths of light contributing to its perceived color when heated.

Neon plasma has the most intense light discharge at normal voltages and currents of all the noble gases. The average color of this light to the human eye is red-orange due to many lines in this range; it also contains a strong green line, which is hidden, unless the visual components are dispersed by a spectroscope.

== Occurrence ==
Stable isotopes of neon are produced in stars. Neon's most abundant isotope ^{20}Ne (90.48%) is created by the nuclear fusion of carbon and carbon in the carbon-burning process of stellar nucleosynthesis. This requires temperatures above 500 megakelvins, which occur in the cores of stars of more than 8 solar masses.

Neon is abundant on a universal scale; it is the fifth most abundant chemical element in the universe by mass, after hydrogen, helium, oxygen, and carbon (see chemical element). Its relative rarity on Earth, like that of helium, is due to its relative lightness, high vapor pressure at very low temperatures, and chemical inertness, all properties which tend to keep it from being trapped in the condensing gas and dust clouds that formed the smaller and warmer solid planets like Earth. Neon is monatomic, making it lighter than the molecules of diatomic nitrogen and oxygen which form the bulk of Earth's atmosphere; a balloon filled with neon will rise in air, albeit more slowly than a helium balloon.

Neon's abundance in the universe is about 1 part in 750 by mass; in the Sun and presumably in its proto-solar system nebula, about 1 part in 600. The Galileo spacecraft atmospheric entry probe found that in the upper atmosphere of Jupiter, the abundance of neon is reduced (depleted) by about a factor of 10, to a level of 1 part in 6,000 by mass. This may indicate that the ice-planetesimals that brought neon into Jupiter from the outer solar system formed in a region that was too warm to retain the neon atmospheric component (abundances of heavier inert gases on Jupiter are several times that found in the Sun), or that neon is selectively sequestered in the planet's interior.

Neon comprises 1 part in 55,000 in the Earth's atmosphere, or 18.2 ppm by volume (this is about the same as the molecule or mole fraction), or 1 part in 79,000 of air by mass. It comprises a smaller fraction in the crust. It is industrially produced by cryogenic fractional distillation of liquefied air.

On 17 August 2015, based on studies with the Lunar Atmosphere and Dust Environment Explorer (LADEE) spacecraft, NASA scientists reported the detection of neon in the exosphere of the moon.

== Chemistry ==
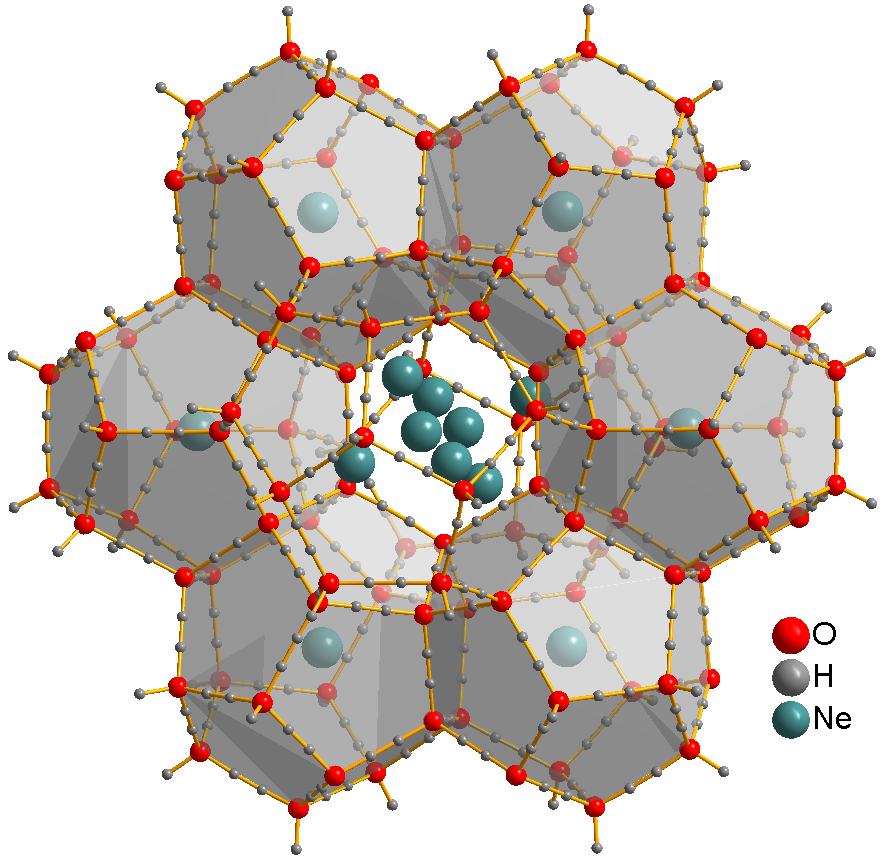
Crystal structure of Ne clathrate hydrate

Neon is the first p-block noble gas and the first element with a true octet of electrons. It is inert: as is the case with its lighter analog, helium, no strongly bound neutral molecules containing neon have been identified. An example of a neon compound is Cr(CO)_{5}Ne, which contains a very weak Ne–Cr bond. The ions [NeAr]^{+}, [NeH]^{+}, and [HeNe]^{+} have been observed from optical and mass spectrometric studies. Solid neon clathrate hydrate was produced from water ice and neon gas at pressures 350–480 MPa and temperatures about −30 °C. Ne atoms are not bonded to water and can freely move through this material. They can be extracted by placing the clathrate into a vacuum chamber for several days, yielding ice XVI, the least dense crystalline form of water.

The familiar Pauling electronegativity scale relies upon chemical bond energies, but such values have obviously not been measured for inert helium and neon. The Allen electronegativity scale, which relies only upon (measurable) atomic energies, identifies neon as the most electronegative element, closely followed by fluorine and helium.

The triple point temperature of neon (24.5561 K) is a defining fixed point in the International Temperature Scale of 1990.

== Production ==
Neon is produced from air in cryogenic air-separation plants. A gas-phase mixture mainly of nitrogen, neon, helium, and hydrogen is withdrawn from the main condenser at the top of the high-pressure air-separation column and fed to the bottom of a side column for rectification of the neon. It can then be further purified from helium by bringing it into contact with activated charcoal. Hydrogen is purified from the neon by adding oxygen so water is formed and is condensed. 1 pound (0.45 kg) of pure neon can be produced from the processing of 88,000 pounds (40,000 kg) of the gas-phase mixture.

Before the 2022 Russian invasion of Ukraine, about 70% of the global neon supply was produced in Ukraine as a by-product of steel production in Russia. As of 2020, the company Iceblick, with plants in Odesa and Moscow, supplies 65% of the world's production of neon, as well as 15% of the krypton and xenon.

=== 2022 shortage ===
Global neon prices jumped by about 600% after the 2014 Russian annexation of Crimea, spurring some chip manufacturers to start shifting away from Russian and Ukrainian suppliers and toward suppliers in China. The 2022 Russian invasion of Ukraine also shut down two companies in Ukraine that produced about half of the global supply: Cryoin Engineering (Ukrainian: Кріоін Інжинірінг) and Inhaz (Ukrainian: ІНГАЗ), located in Odesa and Mariupol, respectively. The closure was predicted to exacerbate the COVID-19 chip shortage, which may further shift neon production to China.

== Applications ==
=== Lighting and signage ===
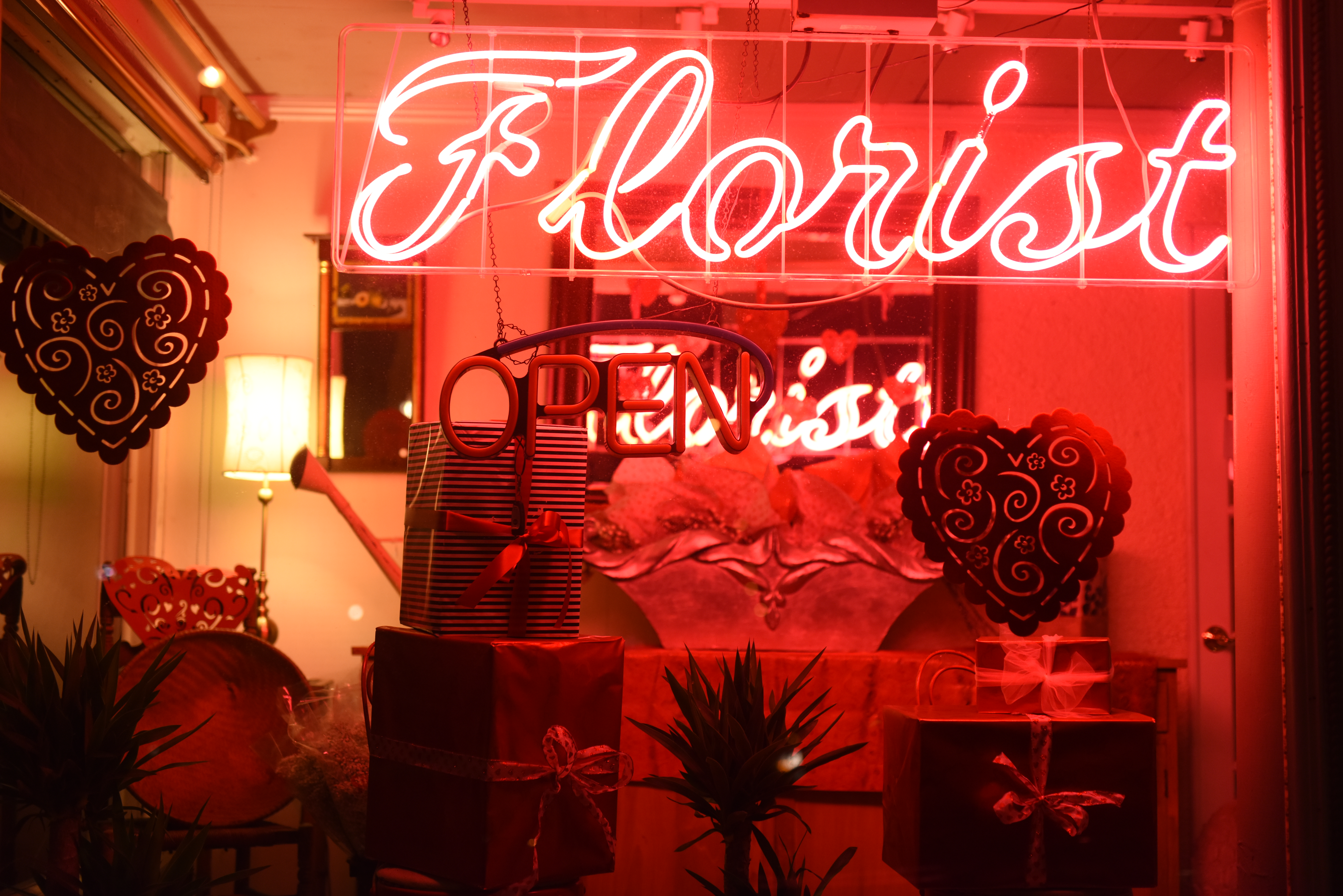
Neon sign in a Hamden, Connecticut, florist shop

Two quite different kinds of neon lighting are in common use. Neon glow lamps are generally tiny, with most operating between 100 and 250 volts. They have been widely used as power-on indicators and in circuit-testing equipment, but light-emitting diodes (LEDs) now dominate in those applications. These simple neon devices were the forerunners of plasma displays and plasma television screens. Neon signs typically operate at much higher voltages (2–15 kilovolts), and the luminous tubes are commonly meters long. The glass tubing is often formed into shapes and letters for signage, as well as architectural and artistic applications.

In neon signs, neon produces an unmistakable bright reddish-orange light when electric current passes through it under low pressure. Although tube lights with other colors are often called "neon", they use different noble gases or varied colors of fluorescent lighting, for example, argon produces a lavender or blue hue. As of 2012, there are over one hundred colors available.

=== Other ===
Neon is used in vacuum tubes, high-voltage indicators, lightning arresters, wavemeter tubes, television tubes, and helium–neon lasers. Gas mixtures that include high-purity neon are used in lasers for photolithography in semiconductor device fabrication.

Liquefied neon is commercially used as a cryogenic refrigerant in applications not requiring the lower temperature range attainable with the more extreme liquid helium refrigeration.
