= Hydroxyl radical =

Neutral form of the hydroxide ion

- Stick model of the hydroxyl radical with molecular orbitals

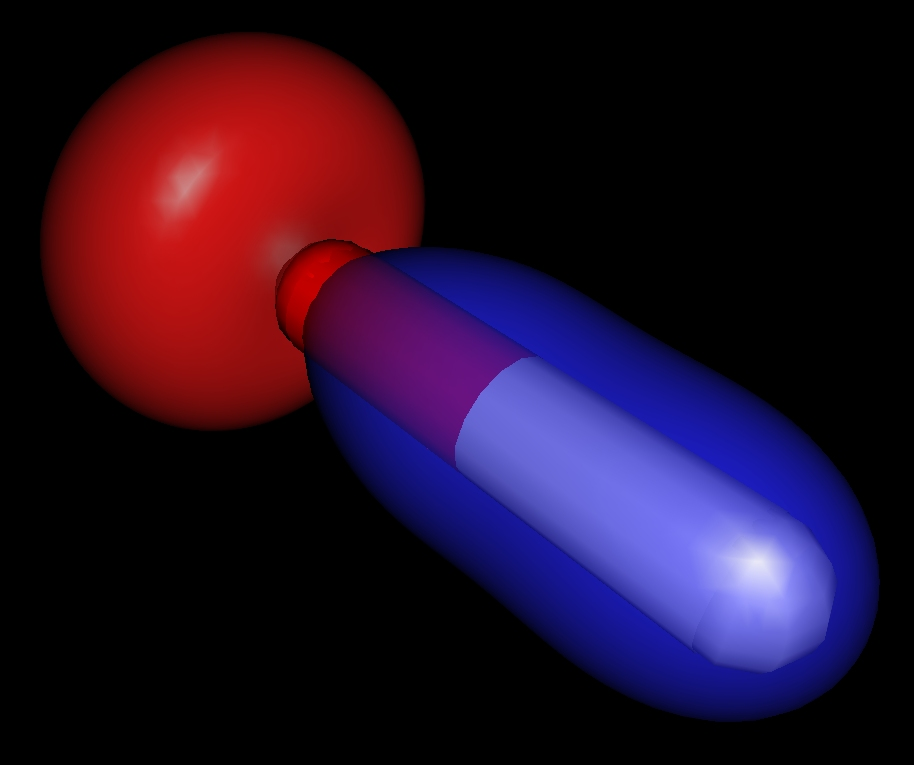

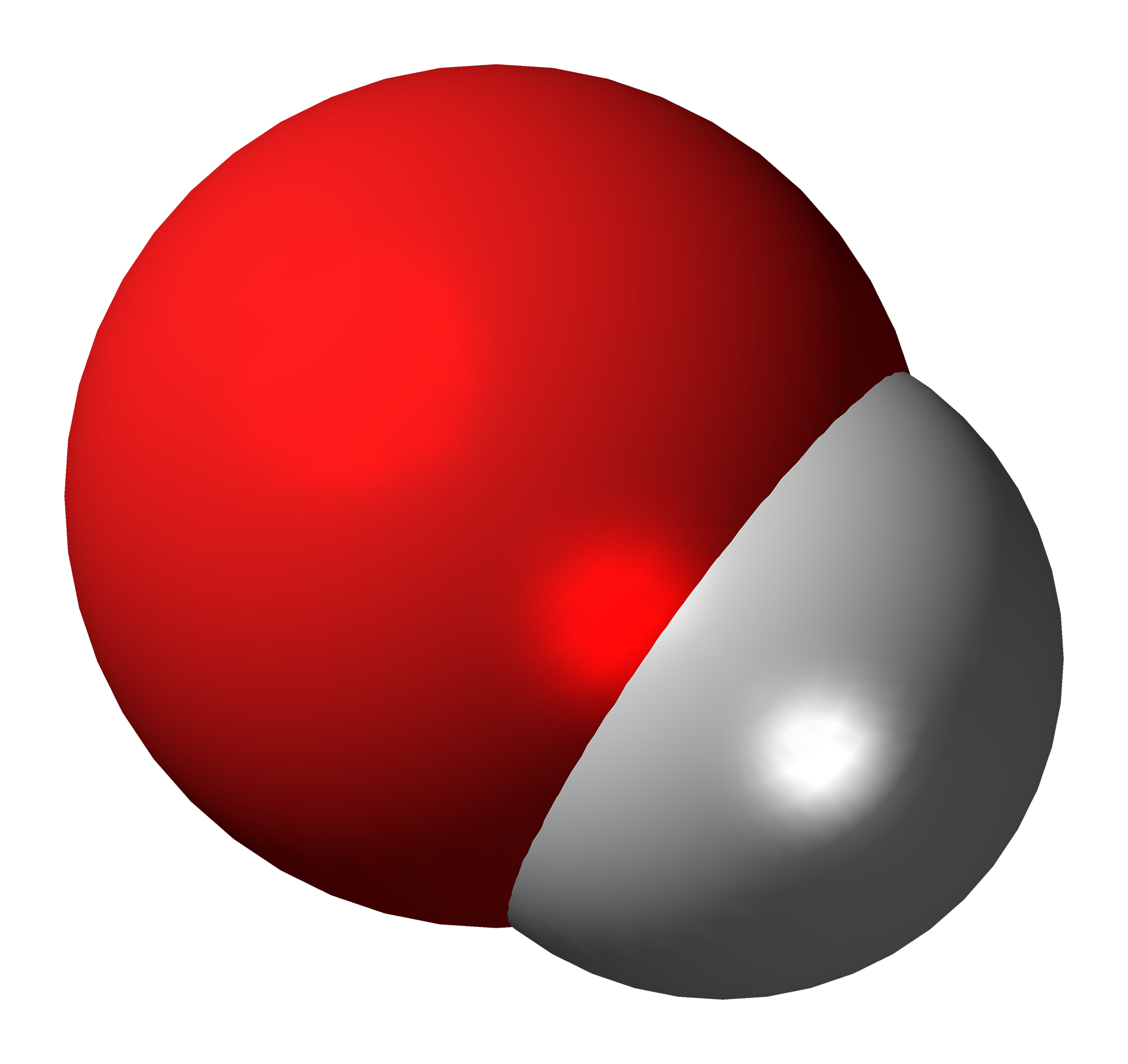

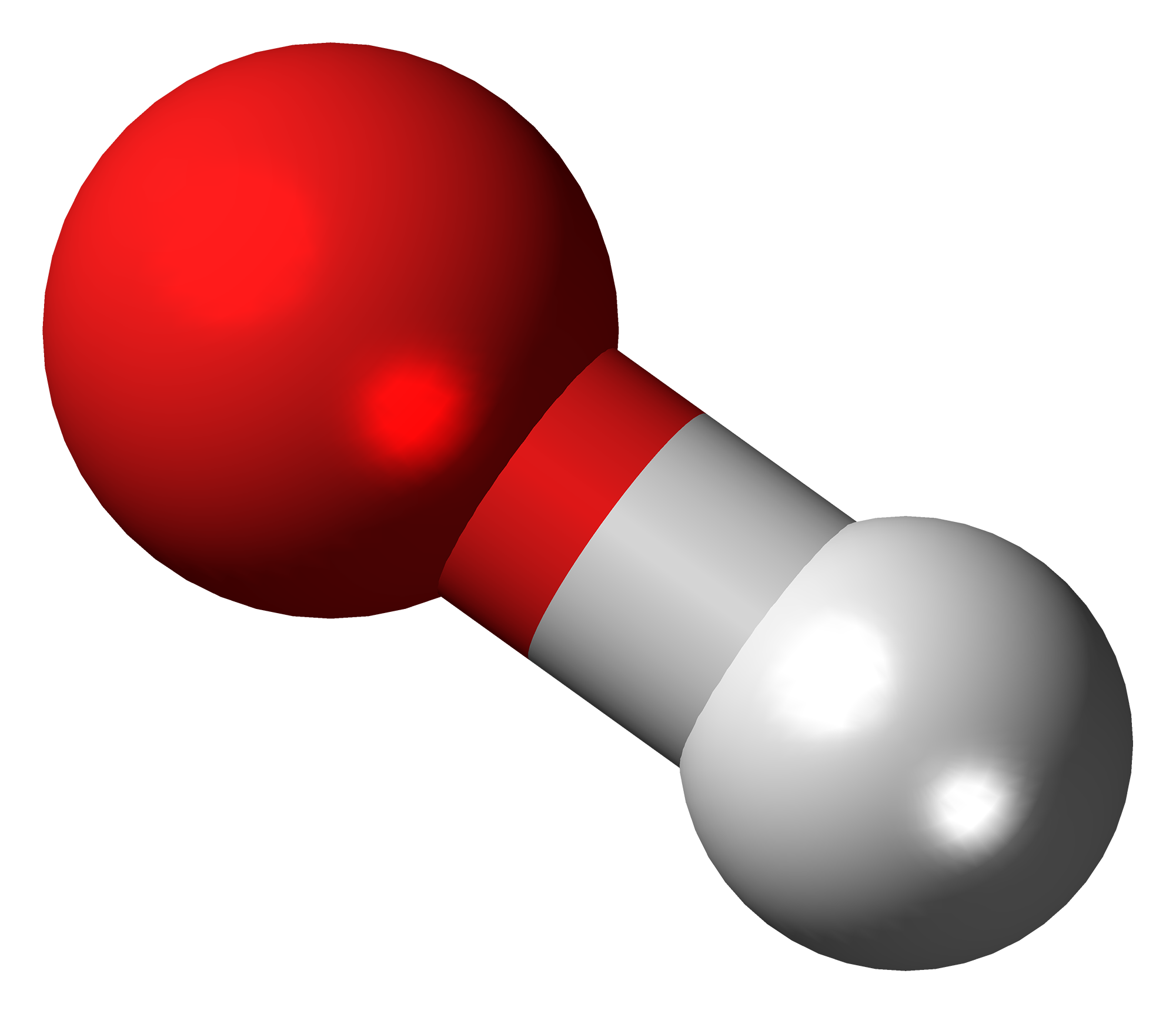

Names
- IUPAC name Hydroxyl radical
- Systematic IUPAC name: Oxidanyl (substitutive); Hydridooxygen(•) (additive)
- Other names: Hydroxy; Hydroxyl; λ^{1}-Oxidanyl

Identifiers
CAS Number	3352-57-6
3D model (JSmol)	Interactive image
ChEBI	CHEBI:29191
ChemSpider	138477
Gmelin Reference	105
KEGG	C16844
PubChem CID	157350
CompTox Dashboard (EPA)	DTXSID901318744
- InChI: InChI=1S/HO/h1H Key: TUJKJAMUKRIRHC-UHFFFAOYSA-N
- SMILES: [OH]

Properties
Chemical formula	HO
Molar mass	17.007 g·mol^{−1}
Acidity (pK_{a})	11.8 to 11.9

Thermochemistry
Std molar entropy (S^{⦵}_{298})	183.71 J K^{−1} mol^{−1}
Std enthalpy of formation (Δ_{f}H^{⦵}_{298})	38.99 kJ mol^{−1}

Related compounds
Related compounds	O_{2}H^{+} OH^{−} O_{2}^{2−}
- Except where otherwise noted, data are given for materials in their standard state (at 25 °C [77 °F], 100 kPa). Infobox references

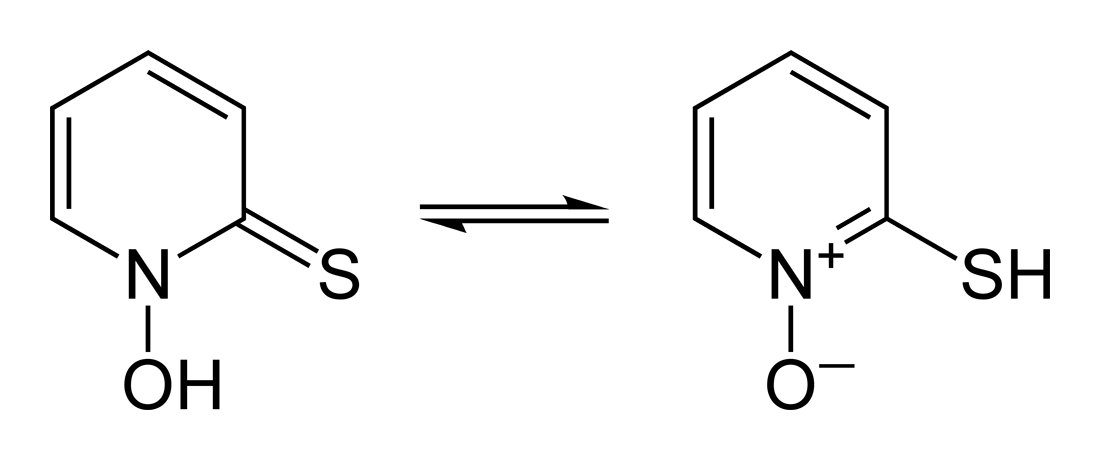
Skeletal formulae of 1-hydroxy-2(1H)-pyridinethione and its tautomer

The hydroxyl radical, denoted as HO^{•} or ^{•}OH, (Note: The dot indicates a free radical (an atom or molecule with an unpaired electron). A raised dot (^{•}) is preferred; a centered dot (•) is better than no dot. H-first is preferred; O-first breaks an ordering rule. Dot-on-the-O is preferred; dot-on-the-H implies an incorrect condition. Still, OH^{•} is highly used and ^{•}HO is often used in reaction chemistry (such as astrochemistry) to visually emphasize the roles of the hydrogen and oxygen atoms. Dot-last is nice to have; dot-first risks confusion with the hydroxy group, −OH. Some fields simply write OH or HO.) is the neutral form of the hydroxide ion (OH^{–}). As a free radical, it is highly reactive and consequently short-lived, making it a pivotal species in radical chemistry.

In nature, hydroxyl radicals are most notably produced from the decomposition of hydroperoxides (ROOH) or, in atmospheric chemistry, by the reaction of excited atomic oxygen with water. They are also significant in radiation chemistry, where their formation can lead to hydrogen peroxide and oxygen, which in turn can accelerate corrosion and stress corrosion cracking in environments such as nuclear reactor coolant systems. Other important formation pathways include the UV-light dissociation of hydrogen peroxide (H_{2}O_{2}) and the Fenton reaction, where trace amounts of reduced transition metals catalyze the breakdown of peroxide.

In organic synthesis, hydroxyl radicals are most commonly generated by photolysis of 1-hydroxy-2(1H)-pyridinethione.

The hydroxyl radical is often referred to as the "detergent" of the troposphere because it reacts with many pollutants, often acting as the first step to their removal. It also has an important role in eliminating some greenhouse gases like methane and ozone. The rate of reaction with the hydroxyl radical often determines how long many pollutants last in the atmosphere, if they do not undergo photolysis or are rained out. For example, methane, which reacts relatively slowly with hydroxyl radicals, has an average lifetime of >5 years and many CFCs have lifetimes of 50+ years. Other pollutants, such as larger hydrocarbons, can have very short average lifetimes of less than a few hours.

Its first reaction with many volatile organic compounds (VOCs) is the removal of a hydrogen atom, forming water and an alkyl radical (R^{•}):

HO^{•} + RH → H_{2}O + R^{•}

The alkyl radical typically reacts rapidly with oxygen, forming a peroxy radical:

R^{•} + O_{2} → ROO^{•}

The fate of this radical in the troposphere depends on factors such as the amount of sunlight, other pollution in the atmosphere, and the nature of the alkyl radical that it formed from (see chapters 12 & 13 in External Links "University Lecture notes on Atmospheric chemistry").

== Biological significance ==
Hydroxyl radicals can occasionally be produced as a byproduct of immune action. Macrophages and microglia most frequently generate this compound when exposed to very specific pathogens, such as certain bacteria. The destructive action of hydroxyl radicals has been implicated in several neurological autoimmune diseases such as HIV-associated dementia, when immune cells become over-activated and toxic to neighboring healthy cells.

The hydroxyl radical can damage virtually all types of macromolecules: carbohydrates, nucleic acids (mutations), lipids (lipid peroxidation), and amino acids (e.g. conversion of Phe to m-tyrosine and o-tyrosine). The hydroxyl radical has a very short in vivo half-life of approximately 10^{−9} seconds and a high reactivity. This makes it a very dangerous compound to the organism. Due to high physiological concentrations of bicarbonate and carbonate in the cell, as well as the rapid reactivity of hydroxyl radicals, some of the oxidative damage attributed to hydroxyl radical may instead be due to carbonate radical formation (CO3^{•–}).

Unlike superoxide, which can be detoxified by superoxide dismutase, the hydroxyl radical cannot be eliminated by an enzymatic reaction. Mechanisms for scavenging peroxyl radicals for the protection of cellular structures include endogenous antioxidants such as melatonin and glutathione, and dietary antioxidants such as mannitol and vitamin E.

== Importance in the Earth's atmosphere ==
The hydroxyl radical (HO^{•}) is one of the main chemical species controlling the oxidizing capacity of the Earth's atmosphere, having a major impact on the concentrations and distribution of greenhouse gases and most air pollutants. Even though HO^{•} is of order 10^{−13} of the abundance of atmospheric oxygen, it is still the most widespread oxidizer in the troposphere, the lowest part of the atmosphere. Understanding HO^{•} variability is important to evaluating human impacts on the atmosphere and climate. Because HO^{•} initiates a number of photochemical chain reactions, it has a lifetime in the Earth's atmosphere of less than one second. Understanding the role of HO^{•} in the oxidation process of methane (CH_{4}) in the atmosphere to first carbon monoxide (CO) and then carbon dioxide (CO_{2}) is important for assessing the residence time of this greenhouse gas, the overall carbon budget of the troposphere, and its influence on the process of global warming.

The main production pathway of the HO^{•} radical in the troposphere comes from the photolysis of ozone at wavelengths less than 320 nm. The excited atomic oxygen formed as a result, O(^{1}D), reacts very quickly with water vapor, H_{2}O, forming two hydroxyl radicals.

O_{3} + hv → O_{2} + O(^{1}D) λ < 320 nm

O(^{1}D) + H_{2}O → 2HO^{•}

Because HO^{•} production in the troposphere relies on the abundance of UV-B radiation, its formation rate is maximal near the equator. The abundance of water vapor around the ITCZ, near the equator, helps the second reaction to evolve quickly.

The photolysis of hydrogen peroxide H_{2}O_{2} is another common way hydroxyl radicals are produced. This occurs at wavelengths less than 300 nm, maximizing its photolysis at 250 nm.

H_{2}O_{2} + hv → 2HO^{•} λ < 300 nm

Because the lifetime of HO^{•} radicals in the Earth's atmosphere is very short, HO^{•} concentrations in the air are very low and very sensitive techniques are required for its direct detection. Global average hydroxyl radical concentrations have been measured indirectly by analyzing 1,1,1-trichloroethane (CH_{3}CCl_{3}) in the air. The results obtained by Montzka et al. (2011) show that the interannual variability in HO^{•} estimated from CH_{3}CCl_{3} measurements is small, less than 2%, indicating that global HO^{•} is generally well buffered against perturbations. This small variability is consistent with measurements of methane and other trace gases primarily oxidized by HO^{•}, as well as global photochemical model calculations.

== Astronomical importance ==
=== First detection of interstellar HO^{•} ===
The first experimental evidence for the presence of 18 cm absorption lines of the hydroxyl (HO^{•}) radical in the radio absorption spectrum of Cassiopeia A was obtained by Weinreb et al. (Nature, Vol. 200, pp. 829, 1963) based on observations made during the period October 15–29, 1963.

=== Important subsequent reports of HO^{•} astronomical detections ===
Year	Description
1967	^{•}HO Molecules in the Interstellar Medium. Robinson and McGee. One of the first observational reviews of HO^{•} observations. HO^{•} had been observed in absorption and emission, but at this time the processes which populate the energy levels were not yet known with certainty, so the article does not give good estimates of HO^{•} densities.
1967	Normal ^{•}HO Emission and Interstellar Dust Clouds. Heiles. First detection of normal emission from HO^{•} in interstellar dust clouds.
1971	Interstellar molecules and dense clouds. D. M. Rank, C. H. Townes, and W. J. Welch. Review of the epoch about molecular line emission of molecules through dense clouds.
1980	^{•}HO observations of molecular complexes in Orion and Taurus. Baud and Wouterloot. Map of HO^{•} emission in molecular complexes Orion and Taurus. Derived column densities agree well with previous CO results.
1981	Emission-absorption observations of •HO in diffuse interstellar clouds. Dickey, Crovisier, and Kazès. Observations of fifty-eight regions which show HI absorption were studied. Typical densities and excitation temperature for diffuse clouds are determined in this article.
1981	Magnetic fields in molecular clouds – ^{•}HO Zeeman observations. Crutcher, Troland and Heiles. HO^{•} Zeeman observations of the absorption lines produced in interstellar dust clouds toward 3C 133, 3C 123, and W51.
1981	Detection of interstellar •HO in the Far-Infrared. J. Storey, D. Watson, C. Townes. Strong absorption lines of HO^{•} were detected at wavelengths of 119.23 and 119.44 microns in the direction of Sgr B2.
1989	Molecular outflows in powerful ^{•}HO megamasers. Baan, Haschick, and Henkel. Observations of H^{•} and HO^{•} molecular emission through HO^{•} megamasers galaxies, in order to get a FIR luminosity and maser activity relation.

=== Energy levels ===
HO^{•} is a diatomic molecule. The electronic angular momentum along the molecular axis is +1 or −1, and the electronic spin angular momentum S=1/2. Because of the orbit-spin coupling, the spin angular momentum can be oriented in parallel or anti-parallel directions to the orbital angular momentum, producing the splitting into Π_{1/2} and Π_{3/2} states. The ^{2}Π_{3/2} ground state of HO^{•} is split by lambda doubling interaction (an interaction between the nuclei rotation and the unpaired electron motion around its orbit). Hyperfine interaction with the unpaired spin of the proton further splits the levels.

=== Chemistry of the molecule HO^{•} ===
In order to study gas phase interstellar chemistry, it is convenient to distinguish two types of interstellar clouds: diffuse clouds, with T=30–100 K, and n=10–1000 cm^{−3}, and dense clouds with T=10–30K and density n=10^{4}–10^{3} cm^{−3}. Ion-chemical routes in both dense and diffuse clouds have been established for some works (Hartquist 1990).

==== HO^{•} production pathways ====
The HO^{•} radical is linked with the production of H_{2}O in molecular clouds. Studies of HO^{•} distribution in the Taurus molecular cloud (TMC-1) suggest that in dense gas, HO^{•} is mainly formed by dissociative recombination of H_{3}O^{+}. Dissociative recombination is the reaction in which a molecular ion recombines with an electron and dissociates into neutral fragments. Important formation mechanisms for HO^{•} are:

(1a) H_{3}O^{+} + e^{−} → HO^{•} + H_{2} (dissociative recombination)
(1b) H_{3}O^{+} + e^{−} → HO^{•} + H^{•} + H^{•} (dissociative recombination)
(2a) HCO^{+}_{2} + e^{−} → HO^{•} + CO (dissociative recombination)
(3a) O^{•} + HCO → HO^{•} + CO (neutral-neutral)
(4a) H_{3}O^{+} + H^{−} → HO^{•} + H_{2} + H^{•} (ion-molecular ion neutralization)
(5a) HCO_{2}^{•} + e^{−} → −OH + CO (electron ... dissociation)

==== HO^{•} destruction pathways ====
Experimental data on association reactions of H^{•} and HO^{•} suggest that radiative association involving atomic and diatomic neutral radicals may be considered as an effective mechanism for the production of small neutral molecules in the interstellar clouds. The formation of O_{2} occurs in the gas phase via the neutral exchange reaction between O^{•} and HO^{•}, which is also the main sink for HO^{•} in dense regions.

We can see that atomic oxygen takes part both in the production and destruction of HO^{•}, so the abundance of HO^{•} depends mainly on the abundance of H^{+}_{3}. Then, important chemical pathways leading from HO^{•} radicals are:

(1A} HO^{•} + O^{•} → O_{2} + H^{•} (neutral-neutral)

(2A} HO^{•} + C^{+} → CO^{+} + H^{•} (ion-neutral)

(3A} HO^{•} + N^{•} → NO + H^{•} (neutral-neutral)

(4A} HO^{•} + C → CO + H^{•} (neutral-neutral)

(5A} HO^{•} + H^{•} → H_{2}O + photon (neutral-neutral)

==== Rate constants and relative rates for important formation and destruction mechanisms ====
Rate constants can be derived from the UMIST Database for Astrochemistry. Rate constants have the form:

$$k(T) = \alpha\left(\frac{T}{300}\right)^\beta e^{-\frac{\gamma}{T}}$$

The following table has the rate constants calculated for a typical temperature in a dense cloud (10 K).

Reaction	$k(T=10\ \text{K})$ / cm^{3}s^{−1}
1a	3.29×10^{−6}
1b	1.41×10^{−7}
2a	4.71×10^{−7}
3a	5.0×10^{−11}
4a	1.26×10^{−6}
5a	2.82×10^{−6}
1A	7.7×10^{−10}
2A	3.5×10^{−11}
3A	1.38×10^{−10}
4A	1.0×10^{−10}
5A	3.33×10^{−14}

Formation rates (r_{ix}) can be obtained using the rate constants k(T) and the abundances of the reactant species C and D:

r_{ix} = k(T)_{ix}[C] [D]

where [Y] represents the abundance of the species Y. In this approach, abundances were taken from the 2006 UMIST database, and the values are relative to the H_{2} density. The following table shows rates for each pathway relative to pathway 1a (as the ratio r_{ix}/r_{1a}) in order to compare the contributions of each to hydroxyl formation.

	r_{1a}	r_{1b}	r_{2a}	r_{3a}	r_{4a}	r_{5a}
Relative Rate	1.0	4.3×10^{−2}	1.3×10^{−2}	3.5×10^{−2}	3.6×10^{−5}	6.79×10^{−1}

The results suggest that pathway 1a is the most prominent mode of hydroxyl formation in dense clouds, which is consistent with the report from Harju et al..

The contributions of different pathways to hydroxyl destruction can be similarly compared:

	r_{1A}	r_{2A}	r_{3A}	r_{4A}	r_{5A}
Relative Rate	1.0	6.14×10^{−3}	1.52×10^{−1}	3.6×10^{−5}	4.29×10^{−3}

These results demonstrate that reaction 1A is the main hydroxyl sink in dense clouds.

=== Importance of interstellar HO^{•} observations ===
Discoveries of the microwave spectra of a considerable number of molecules prove the existence of rather complex molecules in the interstellar clouds and provide the possibility to study dense clouds, which are obscured by the dust they contain. The HO^{•} molecule has been observed in the interstellar medium since 1963 through its 18-cm transitions. In the subsequent years, HO^{•} was observed by its rotational transitions at far-infrared wavelengths, mainly in the Orion region. Because each rotational level of HO^{•} is split by lambda doubling, astronomers can observe a wide variety of energy states from the ground state.

==== HO^{•} as a tracer of shock conditions ====
Very high densities are required to thermalize the rotational transitions of HO^{•}, so it is difficult to detect far-infrared emission lines from a quiescent molecular cloud. Even at H_{2} densities of 10^{6} cm^{−3}, dust must be optically thick at infrared wavelengths. But the passage of a shock wave through a molecular cloud is precisely the process which can bring the molecular gas out of equilibrium with the dust, making observations of far-infrared emission lines possible. A moderately fast shock may produce a transient raise in the HO^{•} abundance relative to hydrogen. So, it is possible that far-infrared emission lines of HO^{•} can be a good diagnostic of shock conditions.

==== In diffuse clouds ====
Diffuse clouds are of astronomical interest because they play a primary role in the evolution and thermodynamics of the ISM. Observation of the abundant atomic hydrogen in 21 cm has shown good signal-to-noise ratio in both emission and absorption. Nevertheless, HI observations have a fundamental difficulty when they are directed to low-mass regions of the hydrogen nucleus, such as the center part of a diffuse cloud: the thermal width of hydrogen lines are of the same order as the internal velocity structures of interest, so cloud components of various temperatures and central velocities are indistinguishable in the spectrum. Molecular line observations in principle do not suffer from these problems. Unlike HI, molecules generally have an excitation temperature T_{ex} << T_{kin}, so that emission is very weak even from abundant species. CO and HO^{•} are considered to be the most easily studied candidate molecules. CO has transitions in a region of the spectrum (wavelength < 3 mm) where there are not strong background continuum sources, but HO^{•} has the 18 cm emission line, convenient for absorption observations. Observation studies provide the most sensitive means of detection for molecules with sub-thermal excitation, and can give the opacity of the spectral line, which is a central issue to model the molecular region.

Studies based in the kinematic comparison of HO^{•} and HI absorption lines from diffuse clouds are useful in determining their physical conditions, especially because heavier elements provide higher velocity resolution.

==== HO^{•} masers ====
HO^{•} masers, a type of astrophysical maser, were the first masers to be discovered in space and have been observed in more environments than any other type of maser.

In the Milky Way, HO^{•} masers are found in stellar masers (evolved stars), interstellar masers (regions of massive star formation), or in the interface between supernova remnants and molecular material. Interstellar HO masers are often observed from molecular material surrounding ultracompact H II regions (UC H II). But there are masers associated with very young stars that have yet to create UC H II regions. This class of HO^{•} masers appears to form near the edges of very dense material, places where H_{2}O masers form, and where total densities drop rapidly and UV radiation from young stars can dissociate H_{2}O molecules. So, observations of HO^{•} masers in these regions can be an important way to probe the distribution of the important H_{2}O molecule in interstellar shocks at high spatial resolutions.

== Application in water purification ==
Hydroxyl radicals also play a key role in the oxidative destruction of organic pollutants.

== See also ==
- Hydroxyl ion absorption
- Hydrogen darkening
