= Fulvio Cacace =

Fulvio Cacace (died 1 December 2003) was an Italian chemist.

In 1963, while at the Sapienza University of Rome, he devised the decay technique for the study of organic radicals and carbenium cations. The technique is based on the preparation of compounds containing the radioactive isotope tritium in place of common hydrogen. When the tritium undergoes beta decay, it is turned into a helium-3 atom, that detaches from the parent molecule, leaving the desired cation or radical behind.

The technique has made it possible to study the chemistry of a vast number of such radicals and ions, in all sorts of environments, including solids, liquids, and gases. In particular, it has provided much of the knowledge of the chemistry of the helium hydride ion, specifically [^{3}He^{3}H]^{+}.

== Some publications ==
- (1966) "A Tracer Study of the Reactions of Ionic Intermediates Formed by Nuclear Decay of Tritiated Molecules. I. Methane-t4".
- (1970) "Gaseous Carbonium Ions from the Decay of Tritiated Molecules".
- (1973) "Gas-phase reaction of tert-butyl ions with arenes. Remarkable selectivity of a gaseous, charged electrophile".
- (1976) "Gas-phase alkylation of xylenes by tert-butyl(1+) ions".
- (1977) "Aromatic substitution in the gas phase. Ambident behavior of phenol toward t-C4H9+ cations".
- (1977) "Aromatic substitution in the liquid phase by bona fide free methyl cations. Alkylation of benzene and toluene".
- (1978) "Aromatic substitutions by [^{3}H_{3}]methyl decay ions. A comparative study of the gas- and liquid-phase attack on benzene and toluene".
- (1979) "Gas-phase reaction of free isopropyl ions with phenol and anisole".
- (1980) "Aromatic substitution in the gas phase. A comparative study of the alkylation of benzene and toluene with C3H7+ ions from the protonation of cyclopropane and propene".
- (1981) "Aromatic substitution in the gas phase. Alkylation of arenes by gaseous C4H9+ cations".
- (1982) "On the formation of adduct ions in gas-phase aromatic substitution".
- (1982) "Alkylation of nitriles with gaseous carbenium ions. The Ritter reaction in the dilute gas state".
- (1982) "Aromatic substitution in the gas phase. Alkylation of arenes by C4H9+ ions from the protonation of C4 alkenes and cycloalkanes with gaseous Brønsted acids".
- (1983) "Aromatic substitution in the gas phase. Intramolecular selectivity of the reaction of aniline with charged electrophiles".
- (1984) "Gas-phase reactions of free phenylium cations with C3H6 hydrocarbons".
- (1985) "Intramolecular selectivity of the alkylation of substituted anilines by gaseous cations".
- (1986) "Temperature dependence of the substrate and positional selectivity of the aromatic substitution by gaseous tert-butyl cation".
- (1990) "Nuclear Decay Techniques in Ion Chemistry".
- (1992) "Proton shifts in gaseous arenium ions and their role in the gas-phase aromatic substitution by free Me3C+ and Me3Si+ [tert-butyl and trimethylsilyl] cations".
- (1993) "Interannular proton transfer in thermal arenium ions from the gas-phase alkylation of 1,2-diphenylethane".
