= NGC 7027 =

Planetary nebula in the constellation Cygnus

Emission nebula
- Planetary nebula
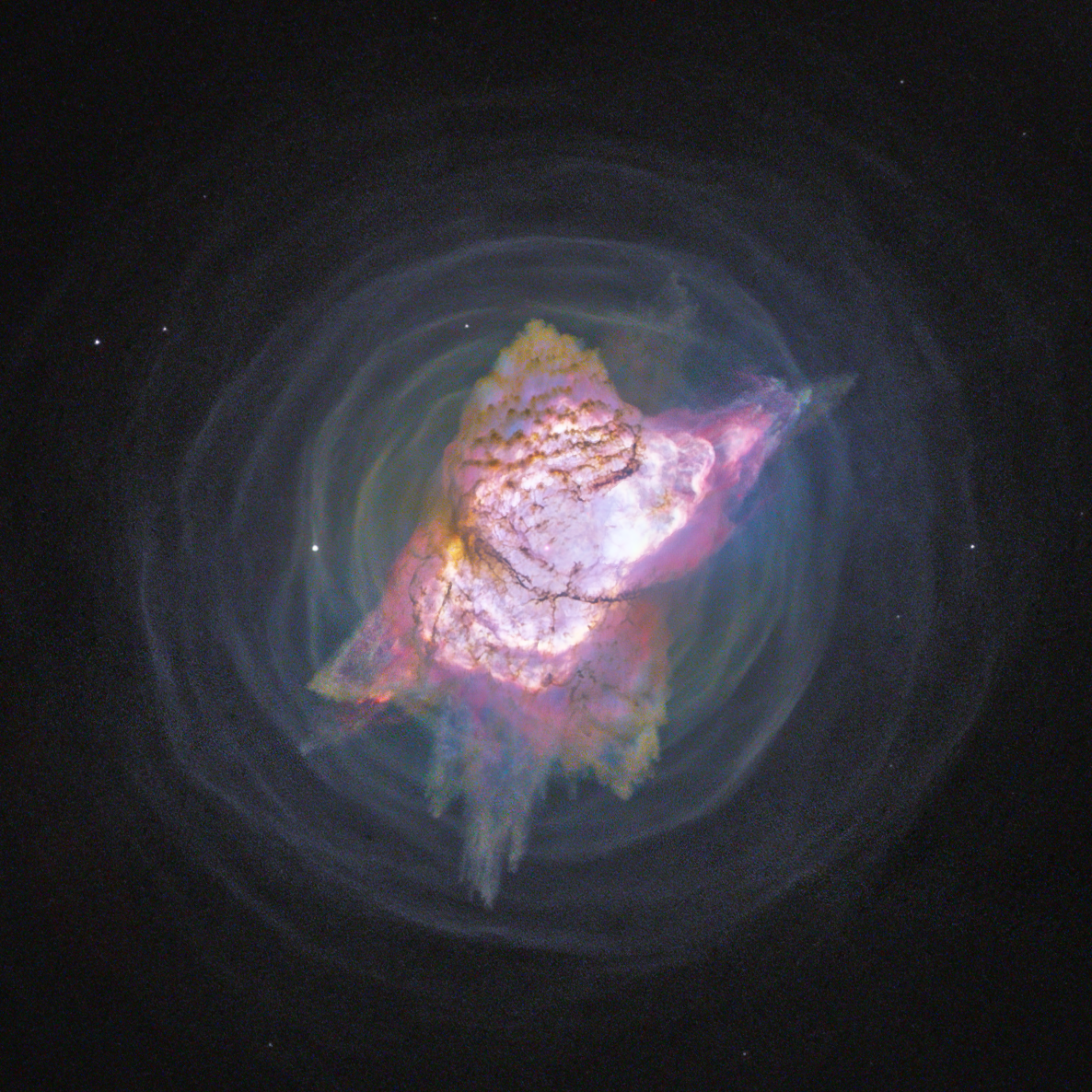
- Hubble image of NGC 7027

Observation data: J2000 epoch
- Right ascension: 21^{h} 07^{m} 1.7^{s}
- Declination: +42° 14′ 11″
- Distance: 3,000 ly
- Apparent magnitude (V): 10
- Apparent dimensions (V): 16" × 12"
- Constellation: Cygnus

Physical characteristics
- Dimensions: 0.2 × 0.1 ly
- Notable features: Young (600 years) and unusually massive (3–4 M_{☉})
- Designations: Jewel Bug Nebula, Gummy Bear Nebula

NGC 7027, also known as the Jewel Bug Nebula, Magic Carpet Nebula, Sugar Pops Nebula, Pink Pillow Nebula, or Green Rectangle Nebula, is a very young and dense planetary nebula located around 3,000 light-years (920 parsecs) from Earth in the constellation Cygnus. Discovered in 1878 by Édouard Stephan using the 800 mm (31 in) reflector at Marseille Observatory, it is one of the smallest planetary nebulae and by far the most extensively studied.

== Observation ==
NGC 7027 is one of the visually brightest planetary nebulae. In a telescope with a 6" aperture at a magnification of around 50× it appears as a relatively bright bluish star. It is best viewed with the highest magnification possible.

In 1977 at Yerkes Observatory, a small Schmidt-Cassegrain telescope was used to derive an accurate optical position for the planetary nebula NGC 7027 to allow comparison between photographs and radio maps of the object.

It has been photographed multiple times by the Hubble Space Telescope since its launch in 1990. Prior to these observations, NGC 7027 was thought to be a protoplanetary nebula with the central star too cool to ionize any of the gas, but it is now known to be a planetary nebula in the earliest stage of its development.

== Overview ==
NGC 7027 is unusually small, measuring only 0.2 by 0.1 light-years, whereas the typical size for a planetary nebula is 1 light-year. It is fairly young, at about 600 years old. It has a very complex shape, consisting of an elliptical region of ionized gas and an equatorial belt within a massive neutral cloud. The inner structure is surrounded by a translucent shroud of gas and dust. The nebula is shaped like a prolate ellipsoidal shell and contains a photodissociation region shaped like a "clover leaf". The inner shell is also punctured by several shocks and X-ray jets, leading to the "spike"-like structures. NGC 7027 is expanding at 17 kilometers per second (11 mi/s). The central regions of NGC 7027 have been found to emit X-rays, indicating very high temperatures. Surrounding the ellipsoidal nebula are a series of faint, blue concentric shells.

The expanding halo of NGC 7027 has a mass of about three times the mass of the Sun, and is about 100 times more massive than the ionized central region. This mass loss in NGC 7027 provided important evidence that stars a few times more massive than the Sun can avoid being destroyed in supernova explosions.

The nebula is rich in carbon, and is a very interesting object for the study of carbon chemistry in dense molecular material exposed to strong ultraviolet radiation. The spectrum of NGC 7027 contains fewer spectral lines from neutral molecules than is usual for planetary nebulae. This is due to the destruction of neutral molecules by intense UV radiation. The nebula contains ions of extremely high ionization potential. The helium hydride ion, thought to be the earliest molecule to have been formed in the Universe (about 100,000 years after the Big Bang), was detected in 2019 for the first time in space in NGC 7027. There is also evidence for the presence of nanodiamond in NGC 7027.

=== Central star ===
NGC 7027 has a rich and highly ionized spectrum caused by its hot central star. The progenitor star of NGC 7027 is believed to have been about 3 to 4 times the mass of the Sun before the nebula was formed. It is possible that the central white dwarf of NGC 7027 has an accretion disk that acts as a source of high temperatures. The white dwarf is believed to have a mass approximately 0.7 times the mass of the Sun and is radiating at 7,700 times the Sun's luminosity. NGC 7027 is currently in a short phase of planetary nebula evolution in which molecules in its envelope are being dissociated into their component atoms, and the atoms are being ionized.

The central star is suspected to be a binary system with the secondary being undetected. Although the details of NGC 7027's formation are unclear, it is hypothesized that interactions with the secondary star produced the complex structure of the planetary nebula, including the jets and resulting spikes.

== See also ==
- List of NGC objects (7000-7840)
- List of planetary nebulae
