= Organopolonium chemistry =

Study of the carbon-polonium bond

Organopolonium chemistry describes the synthesis and properties of chemical compounds containing a carbon to polonium chemical bond.

As polonium is a highly radioactive element (its most commonly used isotope, ^{210}Po, has a half-life of about 138 days), organopolonium chemistry is mostly unexplored, and what is known is mostly confined to tracer-level studies due to self-destruction and charring of the compounds by the energetic alpha decay of polonium. Moreover, the C–Po bond is even weaker than the C–Te and C–Se bonds; compounds with those bonds tend to decompose over time to form elemental tellurium and selenium respectively.

Identification of such compounds has mostly been accomplished using chromatography, with analogous tellurium compounds as references, as classical chemical methods cannot be applied. Their production is often accomplished by the beta decay of ^{210}Bi-containing organobismuth compounds. Some compounds have been claimed but not securely identified.

Relatively well-characterised derivatives are mostly restricted to dialkyl and diaryl polonides (R_{2}Po), triarylpolonium halides (Ar_{3}PoX), and diarylpolonium dihalides (Ar_{2}PoX_{2}). Polonium also forms soluble compounds with some ligands, such as 2,3-butanediol and thiourea.
