= Neon compounds =

Class of chemical compounds

Neon compounds are chemical compounds containing the element neon (Ne) with other molecules or elements from the periodic table. Compounds of the noble gas neon were believed not to exist, but there are now known to be molecular ions containing neon, as well as temporary excited neon-containing molecules called excimers. Several neutral neon molecules have also been predicted to be stable, but are yet to be discovered in nature. Neon has been shown to crystallize with other substances and form clathrates or Van der Waals solids.

Neon has a high first ionization potential of 21.564 eV (2080.6 kJ mol^{-1}), which is only exceeded by that of helium (24.587 eV, 2372.3 kJ mol^{-1}), requiring too much energy to make stable ionic compounds. Neon's polarisability of 0.395 Å^{3} is the second lowest of any element (only helium's is more extreme). Low polarisability means there will be little tendency to link to other atoms. Neon has a Lewis basicity or proton affinity of 2.06 eV (199 kJ mol^{-1}). Neon is theoretically less reactive than helium, making it the least reactive of all the elements.

== Van der Waals molecules ==
Van der Waals molecules are those where neon is held onto other components by London dispersion forces. The forces are very weak, so the bonds will be disrupted if there is too much molecular vibration, which happens if the temperature is too high (above that of solid neon).

Neon atoms themselves can be linked together to make clusters of atoms. The dimer Ne_{2}, trimer Ne_{3} and tetramer Ne_{4} have all been characterised by Coulomb explosion imaging. The molecules are made by an expanding supersonic jet of neon gas. The neon dimer has an average distance of 3.3 Å between atoms. The neon trimer is shaped approximately like an equilateral triangle with sides 3.3 Å long. However, the shape is floppy and isosceles triangle shapes are also common. The first excited state of the neon trimer is 2 meV above the ground state. The neon tetramer takes the form of a tetrahedron with sides around 3.2 Å.

Van der Waals molecules with metals include LiNe.

More Van der Waals molecules include CF_{4}Ne and CCl_{4}Ne, Ne_{2}Cl_{2}, Ne_{3}Cl_{2}, I_{2}Ne, I_{2}Ne_{2}, I_{2}Ne_{3}, I_{2}Ne_{4}, I_{2}Ne_{x}He_{y} (x = 1-5, y = 1-4).

Van der Waals molecules formed with organic molecules in gas include aniline, dimethyl ether, 1,1-difluoroethylene, pyrimidine, chlorobenzene, cyclopentanone, cyanocyclobutane, and cyclopentadienyl.

== Ligands ==
Neon can form a very weak bond to a transition metal atom as a ligand, for example Cr(CO)_{5}Ne, Mo(CO)_{5}Ne, and W(CO)_{5}Ne.

NeNiCO is predicted to have a binding energy of 2.16 kcal (9.0 kJ) mol^{-1}. The presence of neon changes the bending frequency of Ni−C−O by 36 cm^{−1}.

NeAuF and NeBeS have been isolated in noble gas matrixes. NeBeCO_{3} has been detected by infrared spectroscopy in a solid neon matrix. It was made from beryllium gas, dioxygen and carbon monoxide.

The cyclic molecule Be_{2}O_{2} can be made by evaporating Be with a laser with oxygen and an excess of inert gas. It coordinates two noble gas atoms and has had spectra measured in solid neon matrices. Known neon containing molecules are the homoleptic Na·Be_{2}O_{2}·Ne, and heteroleptic Na·Be_{2}O_{2}·Ar and Na·Be_{2}O_{2}·Kr. The neon atoms are attracted to the beryllium atoms as they have a positive charge in this molecule.

Beryllium sulfite molecules BeO_{2}S, can also coordinate neon onto the beryllium atom. The dissociation energy for neon is 0.9 kcal (3.8 kJ) mol^{-1}. When neon is added to the cyclic molecule, the ∠O-Be-O decreases and the O-Be bond lengths increase.

== Solids ==
High pressure Van der Waals solids include (N_{2})_{6}Ne_{7}.

Neon hydrate or neon clathrate, a clathrate, can form in ice II at 480 MPa pressure between 70 K and 260 K. Other neon hydrates are also predicted resembling hydrogen clathrate, and those clathrates of helium. These include the C_{0}, ice I_{h} and ice I_{c} forms.

Neon atoms can be trapped inside fullerenes such as C_{60} and C_{70}. The isotope ^{22}Ne is strongly enriched in carbonaceous chondrite meteorites, by more than 1,000 times its occurrence on Earth. This neon is given off when a meteorite is heated. An explanation for this is that originally when carbon was condensing from the aftermath of a supernova explosion, cages of carbon form that preferentially trap sodium atoms, including ^{22}Na. Forming fullerenes trap sodium orders of magnitude more often than neon, so Na@C_{60} is formed, rather than the more common ^{20}Ne@C_{60}. The ^{22}Na@C_{60} then decays radioactively to ^{22}Ne@C_{60}, without any other neon isotopes. To make buckyballs with neon inside, buckminsterfullerene can be heated to 600 °C with neon under pressure. With three atmospheres for one hour, about 1 in 8,500,000 molecules end up with Ne@C_{60}. The concentration inside the buckyballs is about the same as in the surrounding gas. This neon comes back out when heated to 900 °C.

Dodecahedrane can trap neon from a neon ion beam to yield Ne@C_{20}H_{20}.

Neon also forms an intercalation compound (or alloy) with fullerenes like C_{60}. In this the Ne atom is not inside the ball, but packs into the spaces in a crystal made from the balls. It intercalates under pressure, but is unstable at standard conditions, and degases in under 24 hours. However at low temperatures Ne·C_{60}is stable.

Neon can be trapped inside some metal-organic framework compounds. In NiMOF-74 neon can be absorbed at 100 K at pressures up to 100 bars, and shows hysteresis, being retained till lower pressures. The pores easily take up six atoms per unit cell, as a hexagonal arrangement in the pores, with each neon atom close to a nickel atom. A seventh neon atom can be forced under pressure at the centre of the neon hexagons.

Neon is pushed into crystals of ammonium iron formate (NH_{4}Fe(HCOO)_{3}) and ammonium nickel formate (NH_{4}Ni(HCOO)_{3}) at 1.5 GPa to yield Ne·NH_{4}Fe(HCOO)_{3} and Ne·NH_{4}Ni(HCOO)_{3}. The neon atoms become trapped in a cage of five metal triformate units. The windows in the cages are blocked by ammonium ions. Argon does not undergo this, probably as its atoms are too big.

Neon can penetrate TON zeolite under pressure. Each unit cell contains up to 12 neon atoms in the Cmc2_{1} structure below 600 MPa. This is double the number of argon atoms that can be inserted into that zeolite. At 270 MPa occupancy is around 20% Over 600 MPa this neon penetrated phase transforms to a Pbn2_{1} structure, which can be brought back to zero pressure. However all the neon escapes as it is depressurized. Neon causes the zeolite to remain crystalline, otherwise at pressure of 20 GPa it would have collapsed and become amorphous.

Silica glass also absorbs neon under pressure. At 4 GPa there are 7 atoms of neon per nm^{3}.

== Ions ==
Ionic molecules can include neon, such as the clusters Ne_{m}He^{+}_{n} where m goes from 1 to 7 and n from 1 to over 20. HeNe^{+} (helium neonide cation) has a relatively strong covalent bond. The charge is distributed across both atoms.

When metals are evaporated into a thin gas of hydrogen and neon in a strong electric field, ions are formed that are called neonides or neides. Ions observed include TiNe^{+}, TiH_{2}Ne^{+}, ZnNe^{2+}, ZrNe^{2+}, NbNe^{2+}, NbHNe^{2+}, MoNe^{2+}, RhNe^{2+}, PdNe^{+}, TaNe^{3+}, WNe^{2+}, WNe^{3+}, ReNe^{3+}, IrNe^{2+}, AuNe^{+} (possible).

SiF_{2}Ne^{2+} can be made from neon and SiF_{3}^{2+} using mass spectrometer technology. SiF_{2}Ne^{2+} has a bond from neon to silicon. SiF_{3}Ne^{2+} has a very weak bond to fluorine and a high electron affinity.

NeCCH^{+}, a substituted acetylene, is predicted to be energetically stable by 5.9 kcal (25 kJ) mol^{-1}, one of the most stable organic ions.

A neon containing molecular anion was unknown for a long time. In 2020 the observation of the molecular anion [B_{12}(CN)_{11}Ne]^{−} was reported. The vacant boron in the anions [B_{12}(CN)_{11}]^{−} is very electrophilic and is able to bind the neon. [B_{12}(CN)_{11}Ne]^{−} was found to be stable up to 50 K and lies significantly above the Ne condensation temperature of 25 K. This temperature is remarkably high and indicates a weak chemical interaction.

=== Ionic clusters ===
Metal ions can attract multiple neon atoms to form clusters. The shape of the cluster molecules is determined by repulsion between neon atoms and d-orbital electrons from the metal atom. For copper, neonides are known with numbers of neon atoms up to 24, Cu^{+}Ne_{1-24}. Cu^{+}Ne_{4} and Cu^{+}Ne_{12} have much greater numbers than those with higher number of neon atoms.

Cu^{+}Ne_{2} is predicted to be linear. Cu^{+}Ne_{3} is predicted to be planar T-shaped with an Ne-Cu-Ne angle of 91°. Cu^{+}Ne_{4} is predicted to be square planar (not tetrahedral) with D_{4h} symmetry. For alkali and alkaline earth metals the M^{+}Ne_{4} cluster is tetrahedral. Cu^{+}Ne_{5} is predicted to have a square pyramid shape. Cu^{+}Ne_{6} has a seriously distorted octahedral shape. Cu^{+}Ne_{12} has an icosahedral shape. Anything beyond that is less stable, with extra neon atoms having to make an extra shell of atoms around an icosahedral core.

== Neonium ==
The ion NeH^{+} formed by protonating neon, is called neonium. It is produced in an AC electric discharge through a mixture of neon and hydrogen with more produced when neon outnumbers hydrogen molecules by 36:1. The dipole moment is 3.004 D.

Neonium is also formed by excited dihydrogen cation reacting with neon: Ne + H_{2}^{+*} → NeH^{+} + H

Far infrared spectrum of ^{20}Ne^{1}H^{+}		^{20}NeD^{+}	^{22}NeH^{+}	^{22}NeD^{+}
Transition	observed frequency			
J	GHz			
1←0	1 039.255			
2←1	2 076.573		2 067.667	
3←2	3 110.022	1 647.026	3 096.706	
4←3	4 137.673	2 193.549	4 119.997	2 175.551
5←4	5 157.607	2 737.943		2 715.512
6←5		3 279.679		3 252.860
7←6		3 818.232		3 787.075
8←7		4 353.075		4 317.643
9←8		4 883.686		

The infrared spectrum around 3 μm (10^{5} GHz) has also been measured.

== Excimers ==
The Ne^{*}_{2} molecule exists in an excited state in an excimer lamp using a microhollow cathode. This emits strongly in the vacuum ultraviolet between 75 and 90 nm with a peak at 83 nm (15 eV). There is a problem in that there is no window material suitable to transmit these short wavelengths, so it must be used in a vacuum. If about one part in a thousand of hydrogen gas is included, most of the Ne^{*}_{2} energy is transferred to hydrogen atoms and there is a strong monochromatic Lyman alpha emission at 121.567 nm.

Cesium can form excimer molecules with neon CsNe^{*}.

A hydrogen-neon excimer is known to exist. Fluorescence was observed by Möller due to bound free transition in a Rydberg molecule of NeH^{*}. NeH is metastable and its existence was proved by mass spectroscopy in which the NeH^{+} ion is neutralized and then reionized. The spectrum of NeH includes lines at 1.81, 1.60 and 1.46 eV (685, 775 and 849 nm), with a small band at 1.57 eV (790 nm). The bondlength in NeH is calculated as 1.003 Å.

A helium neon excimer can be found in a mixed plasma or helium and neon.

Some other excimers can be found in solid neon, including Ne_{2}^{+}O^{−} which has a luminescence peaking around 11.65 eV (106.4 nm), or Ne_{2}^{+}F^{−} luminescing around 10.16–10.37 eV and 8.55 eV (122.0-119.6 and 145 nm).

== Minerals ==
Bokiy's crystallochemical classification of minerals included "compounds of neon" as type 82. However, no such minerals were known.

== Predicted compounds ==
Neon monoxide (NeO) is likely highly thermodynamically unstable, if it exists. But it would be isoelectronic to the strongly-bonded F_{2}, and thus possibly kinetically stable.
