= Dioxidanylium =

Ion

Names
- IUPAC name oxooxidanium
- Other names Hydroperoxy cation; Hydridodioxygen(1+); Dioxidenium; dioxidanylium

Identifiers
CAS Number	71722-67-3
3D model (JSmol)	Interactive image
ChEBI	CHEBI:29793
ChemSpider	4574078
Gmelin Reference	508
PubChem CID	5460577
CompTox Dashboard (EPA)	DTXSID601336127
- InChI: InChI=1S/O2/c1-2/p+1 Key: MYMOFIZGZYHOMD-UHFFFAOYSA-O
- SMILES: [OH+]=O

Properties
Chemical formula	HO_{2}^{+}
Molar mass	33.005 g·mol^{−1}
- Except where otherwise noted, data are given for materials in their standard state (at 25 °C [77 °F], 100 kPa). Infobox references

Dioxidanylium, which is protonated molecular oxygen, or just protonated oxygen, is an ion with formula HO^{+}_{2}. It is formed when hydrogen containing substances combust, and exists in the ionosphere, and in plasmas that contain oxygen and hydrogen. Oxidation by O_{2} in superacids could be by way of the production of protonated molecular oxygen.

It is the conjugate acid of dioxygen. The proton affinity of dioxygen (O_{2}) is 4.4 eV.

== Significance ==
Protonated molecular oxygen is of interest in trying to detect dioxygen in space. Because Earth's atmosphere is full of O_{2}, its spectrum from a space object is impossible to observe from the ground. However HO^{+}_{2} should be much more detectable.

== Formation ==
Reaction of dioxygenyl O^{+}_{2} with hydrogen:

O^{+•}_{2} + H_{2} → HO^{+}_{2} + H^{•}

The reaction of the trihydrogen cation with dioxygen is approximately thermoneutral:

O_{2} + H^{+}_{3} → HO^{+}_{2} + H_{2}

When atomic hydrogen, created in an electric discharge is rapidly cooled with oxygen and condensed in solid neon, several reactive ions and molecules are produced. These include HO_{2} (hydroperoxyl), HOHOH^{−}, H_{2}O(HO), HOHO^{−} as well as HO^{+}_{2}. This reaction also forms hydrogen peroxide (H_{2}O_{2}) and hydrogen tetroxide (H_{2}O_{4}).

== Properties ==
In the infrared spectrum HO^{+}_{2} the v_{1} band due to vibrating O–H has a band head at 3016.73 cm^{−1}.

== Reactions ==
A helium complex (He–O_{2}H^{+}) also is known.

HO^{+}_{2} appears to react rapidly with hydrogen:

HO^{+}_{2} + H_{2} → O_{2} + H^{+}_{3}

HO^{+}_{2} also reacts with dinitrogen and water:

HO^{+}_{2} + H_{2}O → O_{2} + H_{3}O^{+}

== Related ==
The protonated molecular oxygen dimer HO^{+}_{4} has a lower energy than that of protonated molecular oxygen.
