= Neptunium fluoride =

Neptunium fluoride may refer to:

- Neptunium(III) fluoride, NpF_{3}
- Neptunium(IV) fluoride, NpF_{4}
- Neptunium(V) fluoride, NpF_{5}
- Neptunium(VI) fluoride, NpF_{6}
