= Bis(dimethoxyethane)neptunium tetrachloride =

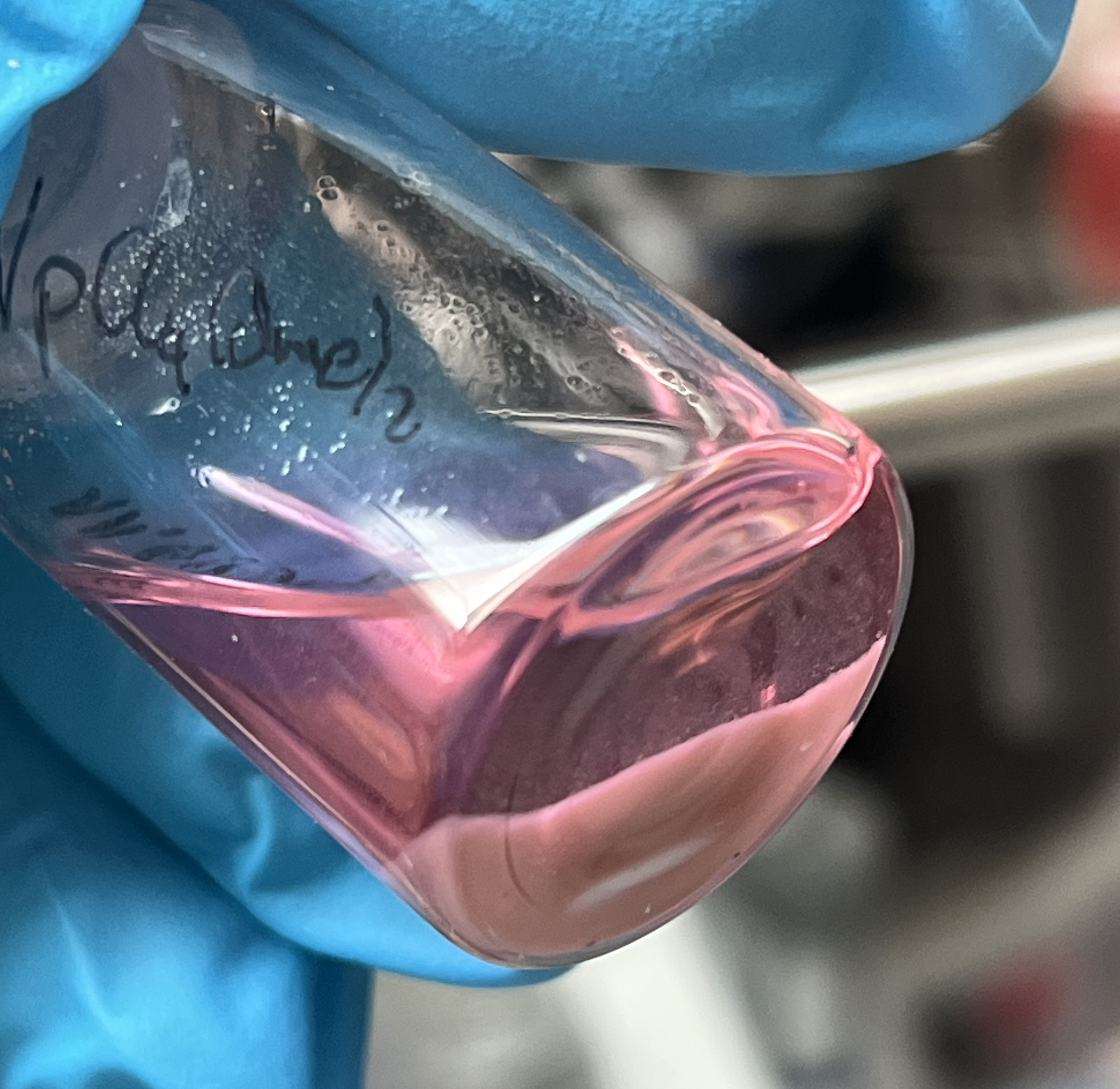
- NpCl_{4}(DME)_{2} dissolved in dimethoxyethane

Identifiers
3D model (JSmol)	Interactive image
- InChI: InChI=1S/2C4H10O2.4ClH.Np/c2*1-5-3-4-6-2;;;;;/h2*3-4H2,1-2H3;4*1H;/q;;;;;;+4/p-4 Key: WHDXICRXPLBYID-UHFFFAOYSA-J
- SMILES: COCCOC.COCCOC.Cl[Np](Cl)(Cl)Cl

Properties
Chemical formula	NpCl_{4}(CH_{3}OCH_{2}CH_{2}OCH_{3})_{2}
Molar mass	559 g·mol^{−1}
Appearance	pink crystals

Structure
Crystal structure	monoclinic
Space group	P2_{1}/c
Lattice constant	a = 16.509 Å, b = 7.2429 Å, c = 14.850 Å α = 90°, β = 115.662°, γ = 90°
Lattice volume (V)	1600.5 Å
- Except where otherwise noted, data are given for materials in their standard state (at 25 °C [77 °F], 100 kPa). Infobox references

Bis(dimethoxyethane)neptunium tetrachloride is a chemical compound with the chemical formula NpCl_{4}(DME)_{2} (DME=dimethoxyethane, CH_{3}OCH_{2}CH_{2}OCH_{3}), and a dimethoxyethane adduct of neptunium(IV) chloride (NpCl_{4}). The original synthesis of this compound involved drying a neptunium(IV) solution with hydrochloric acid, mixing the resulting residue with dimethoxyethane, and adding trimethylsilyl chloride (Me_{3}SiCl). It is also prepared by dissolving neptunium(IV) oxide (NpO_{2}) in hydrofluoric acid–hydrochloric acid mixture, drying to form a residue, dissolving this residue in DME, adding Me_{3}SiCl, stirring, and drying.

A molecule of NpCl_{4}(DME)_{2} consists of a neptunium atom bonded to two DME ligands and four chloride ligands, with the same structure that is seen in the corresponding thorium, uranium, and plutonium compounds. NpCl_{4}(DME)_{2} is used to prepare other neptunium compounds; for example, DME can be replaced with other molecules to form other neptunium(IV) chloride adducts. It has also been used to prepare adducts of neptunium(III) chloride (NpCl_{3}), neptunium(III) bromide (NpBr_{3}), and neptunium(III) iodide (NpI_{3}), as well as to prepare neptunium imidophosphorane (R_{3}P=N^{−}) and imido (RN^{2−}) complexes.

== Synthesis ==
The first synthesis of NpCl_{4}(DME)_{2} was reported by S. D. Reilly et al. in the paper Synthesis and characterization of NpCl_{4}(DME)_{2} and PuCl_{4}(DME)_{2} neutral transuranic An(IV) starting materials. The preparation starts with a solution of hydrochloric acid that contains neptunium in the +4 oxidation state. The purity of the +4 oxidation state is ensured by the addition of hydroxylamine (NH_{2}OH). These solutions are evaporated in a stream of argon gas until dry, which results in a residue putatively identified as neptunium(IV) chloride. This residue is mixed with dimethoxyethane (DME) and heated, partially dissolving it. When trimethylsilyl chloride (Me_{3}SiCl) is added to this mixture, the residue is completely dissolved, forming a pink solution. The solution is filtered, and ethyl ether, (CH_{3}CH_{2})_{2}O, is added to the fluid that passes through. This results in a cloudy mixture, which is cooled to −35 °C. Storing overnight causes a product to precipitate, which is washed with hexane and dried to provide a pink NpCl_{4}(DME)_{2} powder.

An improved synthesis, starting from neptunium(IV) oxide (NpO_{2}), has also been reported. In this synthesis, NpO_{2} is dissolved in mixture of concentrated hydrochloric acid and small amounts of hydrofluoric acid. The resulting solution is dried to form a residue. Subsequently this residue is dissolved in DME, trimethylsilyl chloride is added, and the solution is stirred at 50 °C for 6 hours, turning pink. The solution is then dried, forming a light pink powder, which affords pink crystals of NpCl_{4}(DME)_{2} after washing with ethyl ether.

== Properties ==
Unlike PuCl_{4}(DME)_{2}, its plutonium analogue, which decomposes over time, likely due to a change in oxidation state from +4 to +3, NpCl_{4}(DME)_{2} is stable, both as a solid and in solution.

=== Structure ===
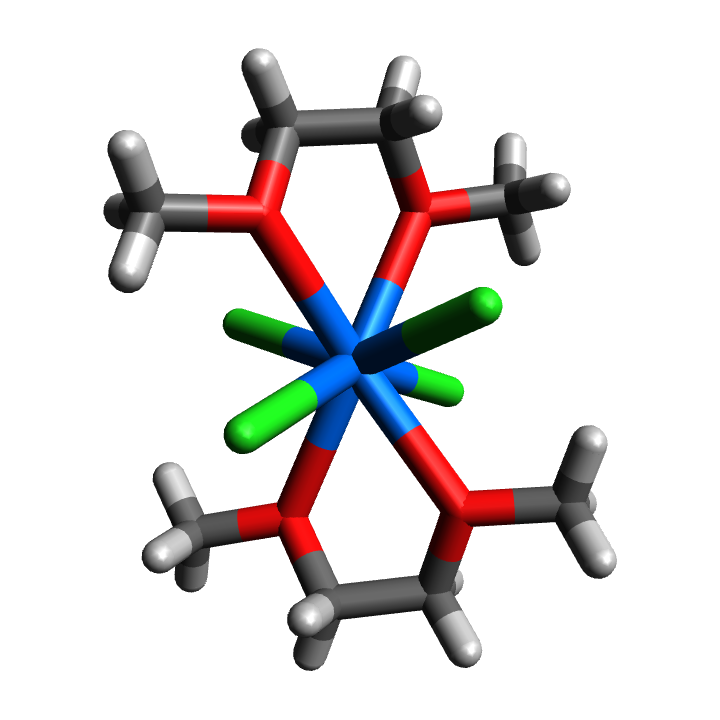
The chemical structure of NpCl_{4}(DME)_{2}. Green represents chlorine atoms, red represents oxygen atoms, grey represents carbon atoms, white represents hydrogen atoms, and blue represents neptunium atoms.

In a molecule of NpCl_{4}(DME)_{2}, the neptunium atom is bonded to two DME ligands. These ligands are bidentate (bonding in two locations), and bond to the neptunium atom with two oxygen atoms each (for a total of four bonded oxygen atoms). The neptunium atom is also bonded to four chloro ligands, so it is bonded to eight atoms total. Its coordination geometry is distorted square antiprismatic. It adopts the same structure as the corresponding compounds of thorium, uranium, and plutonium. The average Np–Cl bond length is 2.602 Å and the average Np–O bond length is 2.55. These bond lengths are longer in the thorium and uranium compounds but shorter in the plutonium compound. These compounds all crystallize in the same space group, P2_{1}/c.

== Reactions ==
NpCl_{4}(DME)_{2} is used as a starting material in the preparation of other neptunium compounds, such as organoneptunium compounds.

=== Solvent exchange ===
The dimethoxyethane ligand in NpCl_{4}(DME)_{2} is easily replaced by other solvents. For example, when it is dissolved in tetrahydrofuran (THF; C_{4}H_{8}O), it forms a pink solution of NpCl_{4}(THF)_{3}. This contrasts the behavior of the corresponding plutonium compound, which is partially reduced to form [PuCl_{2}(THF)_{5}]^{+}[PuCl_{5}(THF)_{4}]^{−} in tetrahydrofuran. NpCl_{4}(THF)_{3} is used as a precursor in the preparation of neptunium(III) compounds. The DME ligand can be replaced by other molecules as well, such as pyridine (py, C_{5}H_{5}N) or acetonitrile (MeCN, CH_{3}CN). When dissolved in these solvents, it forms NpCl_{4}(py)_{4} and NpCl_{4}(MeCN)_{4}. It also forms adducts with triphenylphosphine oxide (Ph_{3}PO) and 4,4′-di-tert-butyl-2,2′-bipyridyl (^{t}Bu_{2}bipy) when reacted with these compounds in THF.

=== Reduction ===
When dissolved in tetrahydrofuran (converting it to NpCl_{4}(THF)_{3}) and reacted with potassium graphite (KC_{8}) or caesium graphite (CsC_{8}), it undergoes a redox reaction in which neptunium is reduced to the +3 oxidation state. This forms a tetrahydrofuran adduct of neptunium(III) chloride, NpCl_{3}(THF)_{n}, which is thought to be either NpCl_{3}(THF)_{3} or NpCl_{3}(THF)_{4}. Addition of trimethylsilyl iodide (Me_{3}SiI) to this compound in THF creates a neptunium(III) iodide tetrahydrofuran adduct, NpI_{3}(THF)_{4}, formed as a yellow powder. The corresponding bromide, NpBr_{3}(THF)_{4}, is also prepared from NpCl_{3}(THF)_{n}, by stirring and addition of trimethylsilyl bromide (Me_{3}SiBr). This forms a red-orange solution, which is dried, washed with pentane, and dried again to get the NpBr_{3}(THF)_{4} product. Like NpCl_{4}(DME)_{2} itself, NpBr_{3}(THF)_{4} and NpI_{3}(THF)_{4} are used as precursors for the preparation of other neptunium compounds. NpCl_{3}(THF)_{n} reacts with pyridine (C_{6}H_{5}N; py) as well; when it is dissolved in pyridine solution, then layered with ethyl ether ((CH_{3}CH_{2})_{2}O) and cooled to -35 °C, it forms crystals of the neptunium(III) chloride pyridine adduct, NpCl_{3}(py)_{4}.

=== Other reactions ===
NpCl_{4}(DME)_{2} has been used in the synthesis of neptunium phosphinimide (R_{3}P=N^{−}) complexes. Reaction of NpCl_{4}(DME)_{2} with K[NP^{t}Bu(pyrr)_{2}] (^{t}Bu = tert-butyl group; pyrr=pyrrolidinyl group) forms the imidophosphorane complex Np(NP^{t}Bu(pyrr)_{2})_{4}, which has neptunium in the +4 oxidation state. Reaction of this compound with ferrocenium tetrakis(pentafluorophenyl)borate ([Cp_{2}Fe][B(C_{6}F_{5})_{4}]) oxidizes neptunium to the +5 oxidation state, forming the compound [Np(NP^{t}Bu(pyrr)_{2})_{4}][B(C_{6}F_{5})_{4}]. This compound is the first known neptunium compound where a high oxidation state (+5, +6, or +7) is stabilized without metal–ligand multiple bonds or fluoro ligands. Reaction of Np(NP^{t}Bu(pyrr)_{2})_{4} with potassium graphite with [2.2.2]crypt present results in the synthesis of [K([2.2.2]crypt)][Np(NP^{t}Bu(pyrr)_{2})_{4}], in which neptunium is in the +3 oxidation state. These [Np(NP^{t}Bu(pyrr)_{2})_{4}]-containing complexes are the first examples of neptunium complexes with the same structure in three different oxidation states.

NpCl_{4}(DME)_{2} has been used to prepare the complex Np(NDipp)_{2}(^{t}Bu_{2}bipy)_{2}Cl (Dipp = 2,6-diisopropylphenyl, ^{t}Bu_{2}bipy = 4,4′-di-tert-butyl-2,2′-bipyridyl). This complex contains the [DippN=Np^{V}=NDipp]^{+} group, an imido analogue of actinyl (AnO_{2}^{x+}, An = actinide) groups. Np(NDipp)_{2}(^{t}Bu_{2}bipy)_{2}Cl was prepared from NpCl_{4}(DME)_{2} through the addition of ^{t}Bu_{2}bipy and LiNHDipp.
