= Neptunium chloride =

Neptunium chloride may refer to:

- Neptunium(III) chloride (neptunium trichloride), NpCl_{3}
- Neptunium(IV) chloride (neptunium tetrachloride), NpCl_{4}
