= Tetrauranium nonaoxide =

Identifiers
CAS Number	12037-15-9
3D model (JSmol)	Interactive image
- InChI: InChI=1S/9O.4U Key: HCFQMUOVHAMWLM-UHFFFAOYSA-N
- SMILES: [O].[O].[O].[O].[O].[O].[O].[O].[O].[U].[U].[U].[U]

Properties
Chemical formula	U_{4}O_{9}
Molar mass	1096.107 g·mol^{−1}
Appearance	crystalline solid
Density	11200 kg/m^{3}

Related compounds
Other anions	Triuranium octoxide; Diuranium pentoxide; Triuranium heptoxide
- Except where otherwise noted, data are given for materials in their standard state (at 25 °C [77 °F], 100 kPa). Infobox references

Tetrauranium nonaoxide is an inorganic compound of uranium and oxygen with the chemical formula U_{4}O_{9}.

== Physical properties ==
The compound forms black crystalline solid.
