= Neptunium bromide =

Neptunium bromide may refer to:

- Neptunium(III) bromide (neptunium tribromide), NpBr_{3}
- Neptunium(IV) bromide (neptunium tetrabromide), NpBr_{4}
