= Neptunium tetraiodide =

Names
- IUPAC name Neptunium tetraiodide

Identifiers
3D model (JSmol)	Interactive image
- InChI: InChI=1S/4HI.Np/h4*1H;/q;;;;+4/p-4 Key: KYXVZPGDAXYSTB-UHFFFAOYSA-J
- SMILES: [I-].[I-].[I-].[I-].[Np+4]

Properties
Chemical formula	NpI_{4}
Molar mass	745 g·mol^{−1}

Related compounds
Other anions	Plutonium tetrafluoride
Other cations	Thorium(IV) iodide; Protactinium tetraiodide; Uranium(IV) iodide
- Except where otherwise noted, data are given for materials in their standard state (at 25 °C [77 °F], 100 kPa). Infobox references

Neptunium tetraiodide is a hypothetical inorganic compound of neptunium and iodine with the chemical formula NpI_{4}. While it has not been discovered, it is expected to be stable.

== Synthesis ==
Neptunium tetraiodide was attempted to be obtained by heating neptunium tetrachloride with silicon tetraiodide at 200 °C in vacuo. However, this only resulted in the formation of neptunium(III) iodide.
