= Neptunium(IV) oxide =

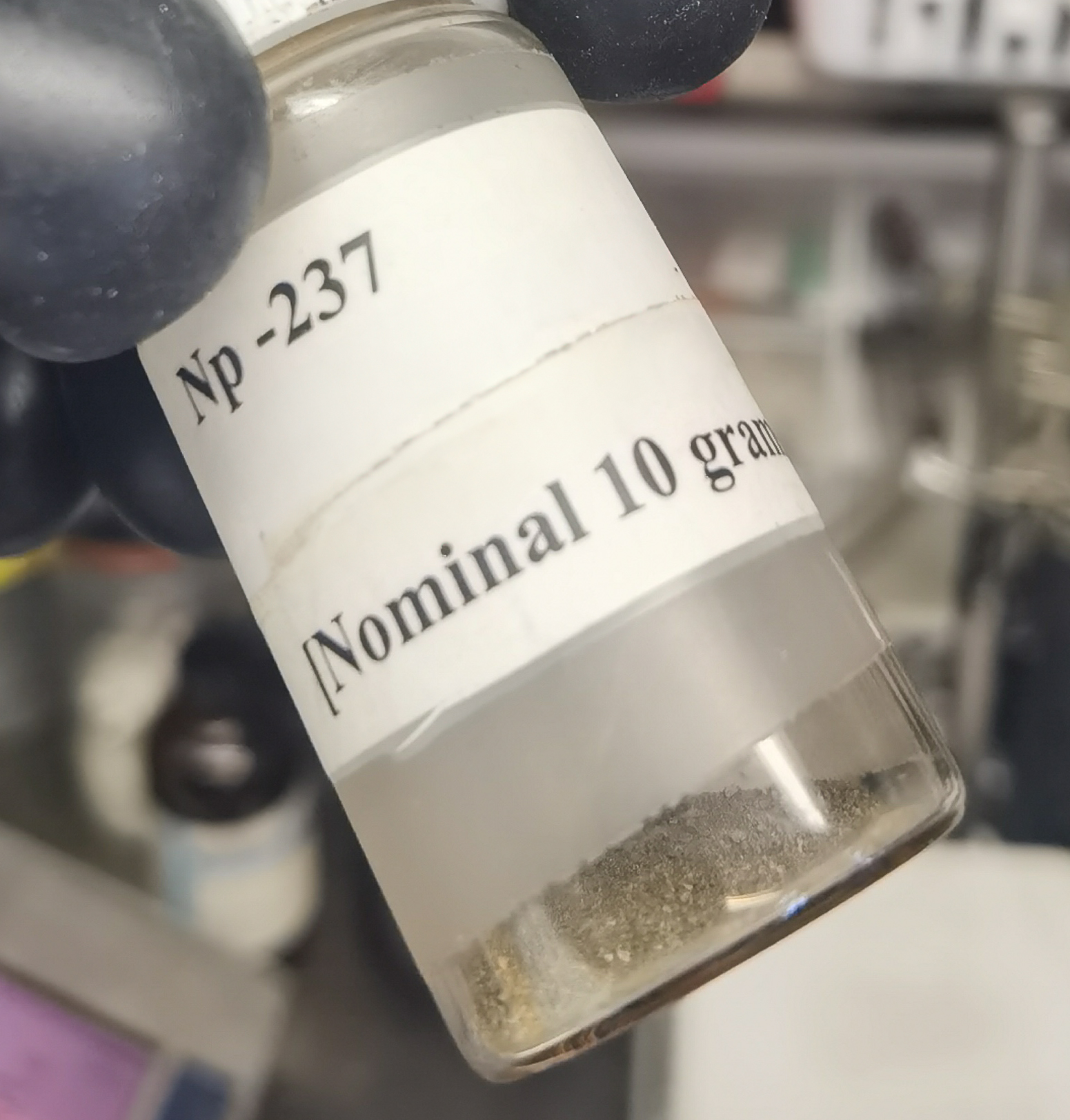

Names
- IUPAC name Neptunium(IV) oxide
- Other names Neptunium oxide Neptunium dioxide Neptunia

Identifiers
CAS Number	12035-79-9
3D model (JSmol)	Interactive image
ChemSpider	34997056
ECHA InfoCard	100.031.651
EC Number	234-830-1
- InChI: InChI=1S/Np.2O/q+4;2*-2 Key: QKUTVYUEUPNRBO-UHFFFAOYSA-N
- SMILES: [O-2].[O-2].[Np+4]

Properties
Chemical formula	NpO_{2}
Molar mass	269 g·mol^{−1}
Appearance	Green solid
Density	11.1 g/cm^{3}
Melting point	2,800 °C; 5,070 °F; 3,070 K

Structure
Crystal structure	Fluorite (cubic), cF12
Space group	Fm3̅m, #225
Lattice constant	a = 5.4334 Å
Formula units (Z)	4

Thermochemistry
Heat capacity (C)	66.24 ± 0.5 J·mol^{−1}·K^{−1}
Std molar entropy (S^{⦵}_{298})	80.3 ± 0.4 J·mol^{−1}·K^{−1}
Std enthalpy of formation (Δ_{f}H^{⦵}_{298})	-1074.0 ± 2.5 kJ·mol^{−1}
Gibbs free energy (Δ_{f}G^{⦵})	-1021.7 ± 2.5 kJ·mol^{−1}

Related compounds
Other anions	Neptunium(IV) fluoride Neptunium(IV) chloride Neptunium disulfide
Other cations	Thorium(IV) oxide Protactinium(IV) oxide Uranium(IV) oxide Plutonium(IV) oxide Americium(IV) oxide
- Except where otherwise noted, data are given for materials in their standard state (at 25 °C [77 °F], 100 kPa). verify (what is ?) Infobox references

Neptunium(IV) oxide or neptunium dioxide is a chemical compound with the chemical formula NpO_{2}, composed of neptunium and oxygen. Solid neptunium(IV) oxide is one of two solid neptunium oxides, the other one being neptunium(V) oxide. It is synthesized in a variety of ways, most commonly by the chemical decomposition of other neptunium compounds (usually neptunium(IV) oxalate, Np(C_{2}O_{4})_{2}), but it is also produced by a process called modified direct denitration (MDD), which involves the calcination of a neptunium-containing aqueous solution. Environmentally, it can be formed by the hydrolysis of neptunium when it is in the +4 oxidation state, making it a relevant form of neptunium in the environment. In an oxidizing environment, it dissolves in water, being first converted into a mixed oxide-hydroxide phase which is then oxidized, releasing the neptunium as neptunyl(V) ions (NpO^{+}_{2}). During dissolution, parts of the neptunium(IV) oxide solid are also broken off.

Neptunium(IV) oxide shows both a hypostoichiometric (which has less oxygen than in the chemical formula, represented as NpO_{2−x}) and a hyperstoichiometric (which has more oxygen than in the chemical formula, represented as NpO_{2+x} but more accurately NpO_{2+x−y}(OH)_{y}·zH_{2}O) phase, though the existence of the hyperstoichiometric phase is controversial. Stoichiometric neptunium(IV) oxide (exactly NpO_{2}) shows a fluorite structure, and has Np^{4+} and O^{2−} ions. Compared to this, the hypostoichiometric phase shows oxygen vacancies and existence of Np^{3+} ions, and the hyperstoichiometric phase shows oxidation of neptunium to the +5 oxidation state and creation of oxo and hydroxide groups. At low temperature, it transforms into a complex phase whose existence is explained by the formation of magnetic octupoles.

Neptunium(IV) oxide reacts with a variety of chemical compounds to produce neptunium halides. Two of these compounds, neptunium(IV) chloride (NpCl_{4}) and bis(dimethoxyethane)neptunium tetrachloride (NpCl_{4}(DME)_{2}), are used as starting materials in neptunium chemistry. Another use of neptunium(IV) oxide is for the production of plutonium-238 as a heat source for radioisotope thermoelectric generators, used for deep space exploration. Neptunium(IV) oxide can also be incorporated into nuclear fuel like mixed oxide (MOX) fuel, or be used as a stable form of neptunium in nuclear waste or storage. If it contains neptunium-237, the most stable and chemically important form of neptunium, it is radioactive by emitting alpha particles and gamma rays.

== Synthesis ==
=== From oxalate ===
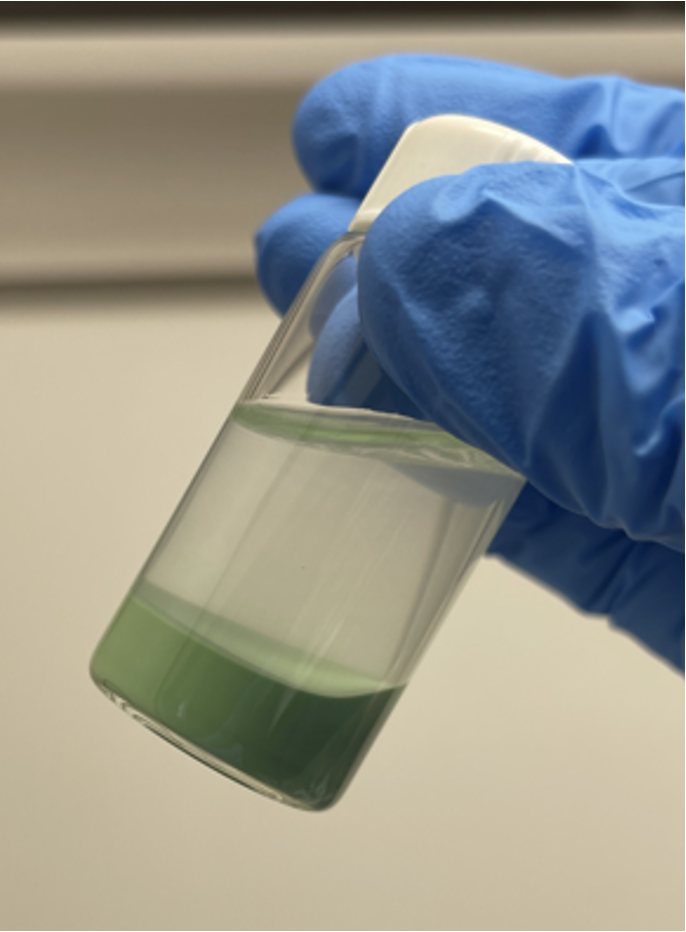
A photo of neptunium(IV) oxalate (Np(C_{2}O_{4})_{2})

The oxalate route is the main method of NpO_{2} production, originating in the 1960s. In it, neptunium(IV) oxalate, Np(C_{2}O_{4})_{2}, is prepared through a two-stage precipitation method. Production of the oxalate starts with a nitric acid (HNO_{3}) solution, which can be prepared via ion exchange. Either hydrazine (N_{2}H_{4}) or hydrazinium nitrate (N_{2}H_{5}NO_{3}) is added to stabilize neptunium's +4 oxidation state, and either ascorbic acid (C_{6}H_{6}O_{6}) or iron(II) sulfamate (Fe(NH_{2}SO_{3})_{2}) is added to reduce any neptunium to the +4 state. This is necessary, as presence of higher oxidation states, namely the +5 oxidation state, reduces the amount of neptunium filtered out. At room temperature and low nitric acid concentrations, ascorbic acid is a slow reducing agent, so the reduction is done at either elevated temperatures (~50 °C) or high concentrations of nitric acid (>4 M). Addition of oxalic acid to the nitric acid solution precipitates neptunium(IV) oxalate (specifically the hexahydrate, Np(C_{2}O_{4})_{2}·6H_{2}O), which is then dried in air.

2 NpO^{+}_{2} + 6 H^{+} + C_{6}H_{8}O_{6} → 2 Np^{4+} + C_{6}H_{6}O_{6} + 4 H_{2}O (ascorbic acid reduction)

NpO^{+}_{2} + Fe^{2+} + 4 H^{+} → Np^{4+} + Fe^{3+} + 2 H_{2}O (iron(II) sulfamate reduction)

Np^{4+} + 2 H_{2}C_{2}O_{4} + 6 H_{2}O → Np(C_{2}O_{4})_{2}·6H_{2}O + 4 H^{+}

Neptunium(IV) oxide is prepared from the oxalate through thermal decomposition. First, the neptunium(IV) oxalate is heated in a stream of nitrogen or air from room temperature to 150 °C over a 1 hour period. Afterwards, the temperature is increased. Heating to 500–550 °C provides neptunium(IV) oxide of satisfactory quality, but temperatures between 400 °C and 900 °C will yield pure neptunium(IV) oxide as well. During decomposition, neptunium(IV) oxalate loses water between 80 and 200 °C, and oxalate groups are decomposed gradually between 170 °C and 370 °C. An unidentified phase is found at 350–390 °C, which is suggested to be hyperstoichiometric neptunium(IV) oxide, but this compound's existence is controversial. NpO_{2} is formed at satisfactory quality for plutonium-238 production at 500–550 °C.

=== In modified direct denitration ===
Oak Ridge National Laboratory produces neptunium(IV) oxide using a process called modified direct denitration (MDD). This process starts from a solution of neptunium nitrate, where neptunium is in the +5 oxidation state. Ammonium nitrate (NH_{4}NO_{3}) is added such that there is a 2.5:1 ratio of ammonium to neptunium. The resulting solution is fed into a rotary kiln and heated to 675 °C. This produces a mixture of neptunium(IV) oxide and neptunium(V) oxide (Np_{2}O_{5}), which is then heated further to 1185 °C to ensure complete conversion to neptunium(IV) oxide.

=== Other methods ===
Neptunium(IV) oxide can be produced through the direct denitration (DD) process. In this process, a solution containing neptunium, purified by ion exchange, is partially dried and calcined in a furnace to produce the NpO_{2} product. In addition, heating various different neptunium(IV), neptunium(V), or neptunium(VI) compounds, like hydroxides, nitrates, or oxalates, at 600–1000 °C causes them to decompose to produce neptunium(IV) oxide. One such compound is neptunyl ammonium nitrate (NH_{4}NpO_{2}(NO_{3})_{3}), prepared by the evaporation of a nitric acid solution containing neptunium and ammonium ions.

A preparation method of neptunium(IV) oxide has been reported through synthesis of neptunium(IV) peroxide. After the nitric acid solution is prepared through ion exchange, and hydrazine is added, as in the oxalate route, hydrogen peroxide (H_{2}O_{2}) precipitates the peroxide. Hydrogen peroxide rapidly reduces neptunium to the +4 oxidation state, so there is no need to use reducing agents like ascorbic acid. This method offers less purification from impurities and is more sensitive than the oxalate method, so the oxalate method is preferred to it.

== Properties ==
Neptunium(IV) oxide containing neptunium-237 (^{237}Np), the most stable and chemically significant form of neptunium, is radioactive due to the presence of ^{237}Np. ^{237}Np decays by alpha radiation into protactinium-233 (^{233}Pa), which emits strong gamma rays.

=== Magnetic and electronic properties ===
Neptunium(IV) oxide is an electrical insulator with a band gap of 2.85 eV. At elevated temperature, neptunium(IV) oxide is paramagnetic. Below 25.4 K, however, it transforms into a complex phase, which has been described by researchers as "mysterious". This phase transition was first discovered in 1953. One hypothesis explained this by stating that neptunium had a +3 oxidation state rather than +4, but neptunium's +4 oxidation state was proven by Mössbauer spectroscopy. This phase transition was also suggested to be a result of a change in the crystal structure of NpO_{2}, but muon spin spectroscopy showed that the transition was magnetic in origin. The idea that the transition is mainly caused by magnetic dipoles or magnetic quadrupoles is inconsistent with observations, so it is proposed that the transition is primarily caused by magnetic octupoles. Bragg diffraction suggests that octupoles as well as hexadecapoles are the main contributors to the phase. The low-temperature phase is antiferromagnetic.

According to density functional theory calculations, the bonds in neptunium(IV) oxide are mainly ionic, but they do show small amounts of covalent character. This covalent character arises from orbital hybridization, mainly from the 5f electrons in neptunium and 2p electrons in oxygen, but there exist some contributions from neptunium's 6d electrons. The ions present in neptunium(IV) oxide are Np^{4+} and O^{2−}, and the Np^{4+} ion has an electron configuration of 5f^{3} for its valence electrons.

=== Structure ===
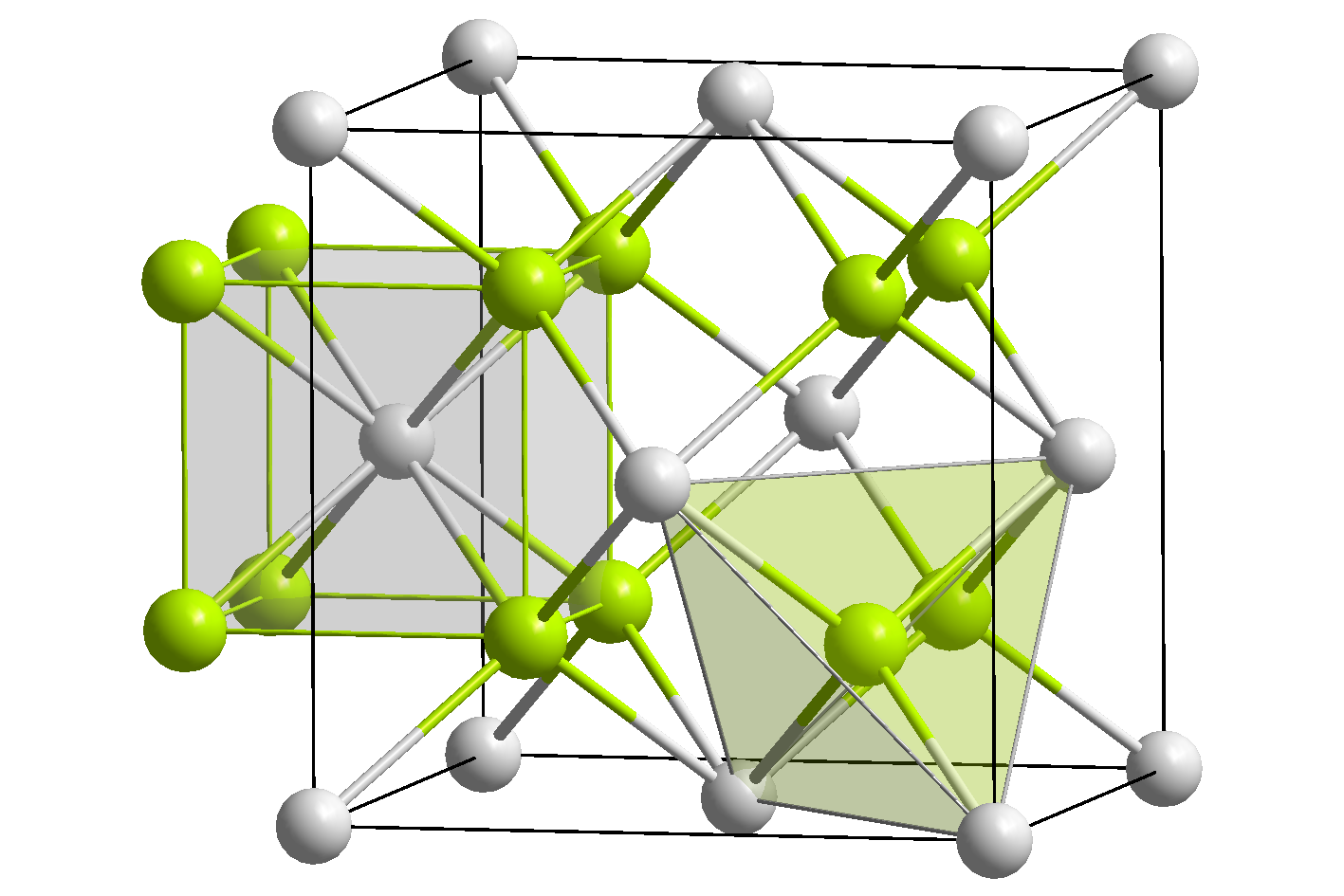
The crystal structure of neptunium(IV) oxide. Np^{4+}: __ O^{2−}: __

Stoichiometric neptunium(IV) oxide (corresponding to exactly NpO_{2}) displays a fluorite structure, with lattice constant a=5.4334 Å. Like all fluorite structure materials, it forms cubic crystals (specifically face-centered cubic) with a space group of Fm3̅m. Neptunium is eight-coordinate, with a coordination geometry of cubic, and oxygen is four-coordinate, with a tetrahedral coordination geometry. This same structure is adopted by all other actinide dioxides (AnO_{2}, where An is an actinide). The lattice constant of these compounds decreases with increasing atomic number. A hyperstoichiometric form of neptunium(IV) oxide has been characterized, though its existence is controversial. Despite its representation as NpO_{2+x}, similarities to plutonium(IV) oxide suggest that its actual composition is more accurately described as NpO_{2+x−y}(OH)_{y}·zH_{2}O. The value of x shows a wide range, up to 0.25. The lattice constant is not changed with increasing x. XAFS shows its structure to contain short neptunium-oxygen bonds around 1.85–1.90 Å, suggestive of an oxo (Np=O) or a neptunyl (O=Np=O) group. It also shows evidence of hydroxide groups. The compound displays phase separation into NpO_{2} and Np_{4}O_{9}. Neptunium(IV) oxide shows a hypostoichiometric phase as well, represented NpO_{2−x}, where x is at most 0.1. The departure from the fluorite-structured NpO_{2.0} phase is attributed to the formation of oxygen vacancies, Np^{3+} ions, and, at higher temperatures, oxygen Frenkel pairs.

Neptunium(IV) oxide produced from the calcination of neptunium(IV) oxalate (Np(C_{2}O_{4})_{2}) retains its shape on heating. It is polycrystalline (made of individual grains), and the size of these grains increases when the temperature Np(C_{2}O_{4})_{2} is heated to is higher. The surface area and size of the grain boundaries decreases upon heating, and the particle size is between 11 and 371 nm. When produced from the dilution of a neptunium carbonate solution, neptunium(IV) is also a polycrystalline material, in this case showing a grain size of 2–5 nm. Polycrystalline NpO_{2} is additionally produced through the direct denitration (DD) and modified direct denitration (MDD) methods. In DD, the grain size is approximately 100 nm, whereas in MDD, the grain size is approximately 500–1000 nm.

Neptunium(IV) oxide grain size based on calcination temperature of neptunium(IV) oxalate
Calcination temperature(°C)	400	500	600	700	800	900
Average grain size (nm)	11.05 ± 2.78	20.18 ± 5.35	44.77 ± 29.44	94.14 ± 33.90	213.78 ± 81.05	371.80 ± 126.50

=== Relationship to related compounds ===
Neptunium(IV) oxide is one of two solid neptunium oxides, the other being neptunium(V) oxide (Np_{2}O_{5}). An oxide of composition Np_{4}O_{9} has been suggested, which would fill in the gap between NpO_{2} with a fluorite structure and Np_{2}O_{5} with a layered structure, though it has not been synthesized in bulk. Np_{2}O_{5} is unstable, and only exists at low temperatures; it decomposes into neptunium(IV) oxide and oxygen gas between 700 and 973 K.

2 Np_{2}O_{5} → 4 NpO_{2} + O_{2}

The hyperstoichiometric phase of neptunium(IV) oxide, if it exists is formed by the oxidation and hydrolysis of stoichiometric neptunium(IV) oxide, reactions which also occur for the corresponding plutonium compound plutonium(IV) oxide. Neptunium(IV) oxide shows a hypostoichiometric phase at temperatures above 1300 K, which decomposes into stoichiometric neptunium(IV) oxide and metallic neptunium at lower temperatures. This phase is formed when stoichiometric NpO_{2} is heated in a reducing atmosphere, for example, in hydrogen gas between 1400 and 2800 K; when heated in an oxidizing environment, stoichiometric NpO_{2} remains stable. Its chemical formula phase is NpO_{2−x}, and at 2300 K, x has a maximum of 0.1. Neptunium(IV) oxide (both stoichiometric and hyperstoichiometric) melts congruently at a temperature of 3070 ± 67 K, with composition between NpO_{1.98} and NpO_{2}.

As a gas, neptunium(IV) oxide is one of three gaseous neptunium oxides, the others being neptunium monoxide (NpO) and neptunium trioxide (NpO_{3}). How much of each of these species, along with neptunium gas, is present, depends on the temperature and amount of oxygen. When neptunium(IV) oxide is vaporized, gaseous NpO and NpO_{2} are formed.

== Reactions ==
=== Dissolution ===
In reducing conditions, neptunium(IV) oxide is highly insoluble. However, under oxidizing environments, neptunium(IV) oxide is partially dissolved in water. While neptunium in its +4 oxidation state as in NpO_{2} does not dissolve easily, upon oxidation it can dissolve with conversion to higher oxidation states. Dissolution of NpO_{2} under these conditions can produce colloidal and ionic neptunium species, and primarily occurs at grain boundaries (boundaries between particles in a solid). Dissolution occurs quickly at first (within 4 weeks), but afterwards becomes more gradual. During dissolution, sections of neptunium(IV) oxide can break off, which is what likely forms the colloids. The production of ionic neptunium species, NpO^{+}_{2}, happens first through the reaction of neptunium(IV) oxide at the grain boundaries to produce a neptunium hydroxide phase, NpO_{x}(OH)_{y}·zH_{2}O. This phase is then oxidized, releasing NpO^{+}_{2} into solution. How fast neptunium(IV) oxide dissolves strongly depends on the size of the individual particles that make up the solid; when they are larger, the surface area and grain boundaries are smaller, so the dissolution occurs much slower than when the particles are smaller.

Neptunium(IV) oxide dissolves in nitric acid (HNO_{3}). When refluxing at concentrations of 0.8 to 4.0 M HNO_{3}, the dissolution occurs takes between 8 and 10 hours, and the dissolution time is independent of HNO_{3} concentration. Refluxing at higher concentrations (e.g. 12 M) is used to dissolve neptunium(IV) oxide as well. It also dissolves in a mixture of hydrofluoric acid and concentrated hydrochloric acid. It is slightly dissolved by aqueous solutions containing sodium carbonate (Na_{2}CO_{3}) and hydrogen peroxide (H_{2}O_{2}). Oxidizing agents like ammonium persulfate ((NH_{4})_{2}S_{2}O_{8}) do not significantly increase the amount dissolved, which does not exceed 1.5–1.6%. Sonication can increase the amount dissolved to 25%.

=== Halogenation ===
At high temperatures, neptunium fluorides can form from the reaction of neptunium(IV) oxide with hydrogen fluoride (HF). With hydrogen gas (H_{2}) present, neptunium(III) fluoride (NpF_{3}) is formed at 500 °C, but if hydrogen is not added, neptunium(IV) fluoride (NpF_{4}) is formed. NpF_{4} is also formed when neptunium(IV) oxide is treated with a gaseous mixture of oxygen (O_{2}) and HF at 450–600 °C or when NpO_{2} is heated between 280 and 330 °C in fluorine (F_{2}). Heating NpO_{2} in fluorine at 500 °C produces neptunium hexafluoride (NpF_{6}), with neptunyl fluoride (NpO_{2}F_{2}) as an intermediate. Neptunium hexafluoride is also formed when neptunium(IV) oxide reacts with dioxygen difluoride (O_{2}F_{2}).

2 NpO_{2} + H_{2} + 6 HF → 2 NpF_{3} + 4 H_{2}O

NpO_{2} + 4 HF → NpF_{4} + 2 H_{2}O

NpO_{2} + x O_{2}F_{2} → NpF_{6} + (x + 1) O_{2} + (x - 3) F_{2}

Neptunium(IV) oxide reacts with carbon tetrachloride (CCl_{4}) between 280 and 500 °C to produce neptunium(IV) chloride. At 350–400 °C, reaction of neptunium(IV) oxide with CCl_{4} as well as H_{2} reduces it, producing neptunium(III) chloride (NpCl_{3}). Reaction of hydrogen bromide (HBr) or hydrogen iodide (HI) with neptunium(IV) oxide at 500 °C provides neptunium(III) bromide (NpBr_{3}) and neptunium(III) iodide (NpI_{3}), respectively. Neptunium(IV) bromide (NpBr_{4}) is prepared by the reaction of neptunium(IV) oxide with aluminium(III) bromide (AlBr_{3}). If aluminium metal is added as well, NpBr_{3} is formed instead. A reaction of aluminium(III) iodide, AlI_{3}, with neptunium(IV) oxide forms NpI_{3}.

3 NpO_{2} + 4 AlBr_{3} → 3 NpBr_{4} + 2 Al_{2}O_{3}

== Uses ==
=== In plutonium production ===
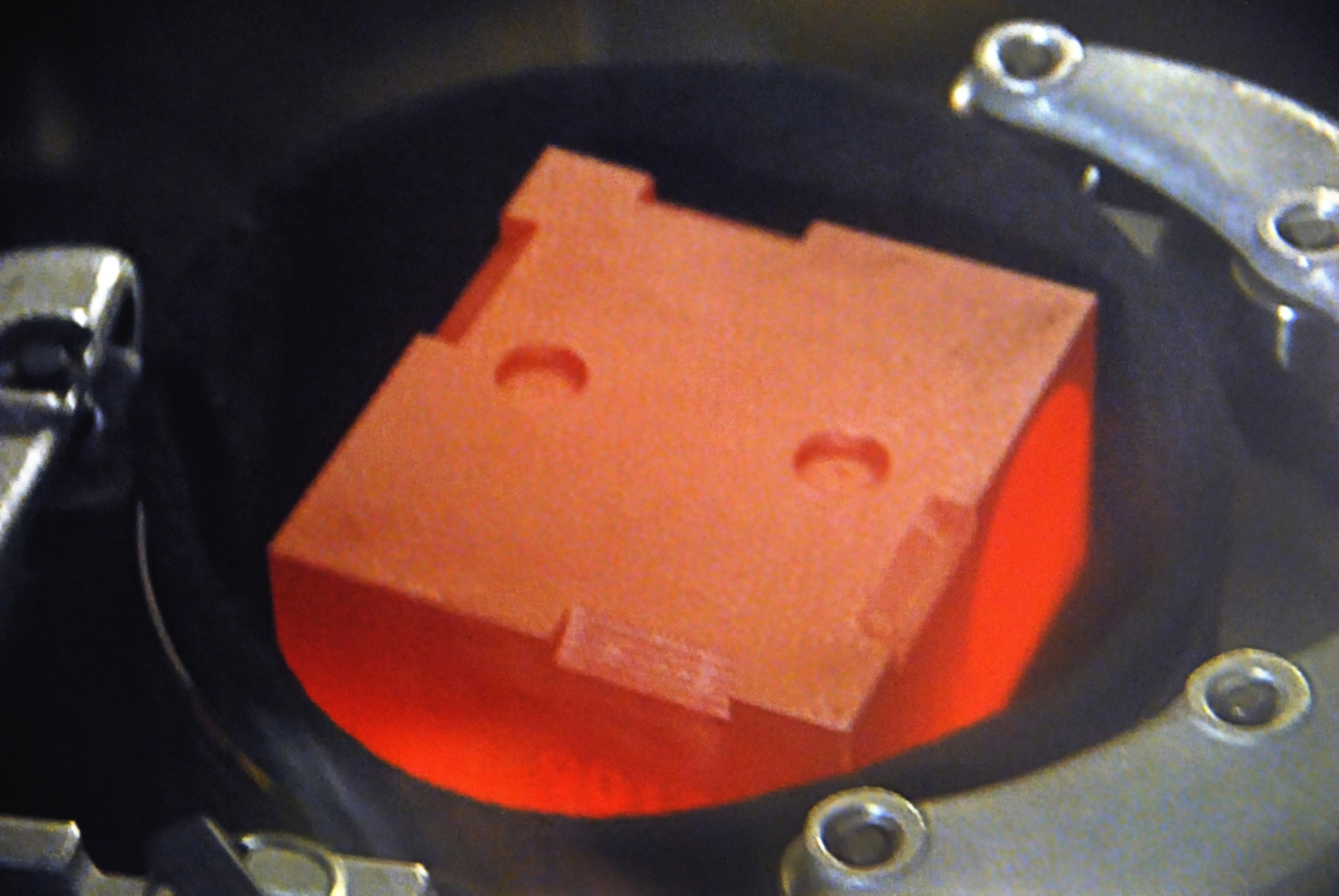
The ^{238}PuO_{2} radioisotope thermoelectric generator of the Curiosity rover

Neptunium(IV) oxide is used for the production of plutonium-238 for radioisotope thermoelectric generators (RTGs), such as those used by the National Aeronautics and Space Administration (NASA) for deep space exploration. After preparation, it is treated to remove impurities like protactinium-233 to reduce radiation. Then, it is mixed with powdered aluminium, and the resulting mixture is pressed into pellets. The pellets are then irradiated to convert neptunium-237 to plutonium-238. The conversion happens through neutron capture. After irradiation, the pellets are dissolved, first in a nitrate (NO^{−}_{3}) solution to remove the aluminium, and then in nitric acid (HNO_{3}) to dissolve the neptunium and plutonium. Solvent extraction is used to isolate the plutonium and the neptunium, separating them from fission products. The plutonium and neptunium are purified by ion exchange. The plutonium is converted to the final product of plutonium(IV) oxide (PuO_{2}), which is used as the heat source for the RTGs. The neptunium is converted back into neptunium(IV) oxide and used to make more plutonium.

=== In storage and waste ===
As a stable neptunium compound, neptunium(IV) oxide is used as a form of neptunium for storage. For example, neptunium-237 for the production of plutonium-238 is stored as NpO_{2}, such as at Idaho National Laboratory. It is also a form of neptunium found in legacy nuclear waste.

=== Mixed oxide fuel ===
Neptunium(IV) oxide can be used in mixed oxide fuel (MOX fuel) for nuclear reactors like fast-neutron reactors. When MOX fuel is used up, the reprocessing of the resulting spent nuclear fuel isolates neptunium and other minor actinides, which are formed from radioactive decay and neutron capture, and can be reused and fed back into the fuel. Using neptunium(IV) oxide in fuel converts neptunium-237 to isotopes that are lighter and less radioactive, reducing its toxicity. In MOX fuel, neptunium(IV) oxide is incorporated with other actinide oxides, like thorium(IV) oxide, uranium(IV) oxide, and plutonium(IV) oxide. There are two ways to incorporate NpO_{2} and other minor actinide oxides into fuel: homogeneous mode, where the oxides are incorporated into the main fuel at 2–6% concentration, and heterogeneous, where they are separated from the main fuel and incorporated at 10–30% concentration.

=== As a precursor ===
Neptunium(IV) oxide is used as a precursor to other neptunium compounds. For example, it can be used in the synthesis of a common stating material in neptunium chemistry, bis(dimethoxyethane)neptunium tetrachloride (NpCl_{4}(DME)_{2}; DME = dimethoxyethane, CH_{3}OCH_{2}CH_{2}OCH_{3}). Dissolution of neptunium(IV) oxide in hydrofluoric acid/concentrated hydrochloric acid mixture and subsequent drying produces a residue. Dissolving this residue in dimethoxyethane, addition of trimethylsilyl chloride (Si(CH_{3})_{3}Cl), drying, and washing with diethyl ether gives pink crystals of NpCl_{4}(DME)_{2} as the product.

Another important starting material prepared from NpO_{2} is neptunium(IV) chloride, NpCl_{4}, through the reaction with carbon tetrachloride (CCl_{4}) at high temperatures (>600 °C) and sublimation at higher temperatures to purify the product. This compound in turn is used to create other starting materials, caesium hexachloroneptunate(IV) (Cs_{2}NpCl_{6}) and tetraethylammonium hexachloroneptunate(IV) ([(C_{2}H_{5})_{4}N]_{2}NpCl_{6}), through reaction with caesium chloride (CsCl) and tetraethylammonium chloride ([(C_{2}H_{5})_{4}N]_{2}Cl), respectively, in hydrochloric acid. However, these methods are hindered by the hazardous conditions needed to prepare NpCl_{4}.

== In the environment ==
In aqueous solution, actinides from nuclear waste in their +4 oxidation state often undergo hydrolysis, forming actinide oxide or oxide-hydroxide particles and colloids, which, in the case of neptunium, can can eventually form neptunium(IV) oxide. Along with neptunium(IV) oxide's stability, this makes it a relevant form of neptunium in the environment. Dilution of a mildly basic neptunium carbonate solution containing Np(CO_{3})^{6−}_{5} ions converts the ions through olation to neptunium oxide colloids, which precipiate as nanocrystalline neptunium(IV) oxide. This method of formation is expected to occur in geological environments.

Neptunium(IV) oxide is highly insoluble in reducing conditions, which limits neptunium's ability to travel in the environment. Under oxidizing conditions, however, neptunium(IV) oxide can potentially be dissolved and oxidized to form the neptunyl(V) cation, NpO^{+}_{2}. This cation is extremely soluble and mobile. Dissolution can also cause parts of neptunium(IV) oxide to break off and form colloids.
