= Neptunyl ammonium nitrate =

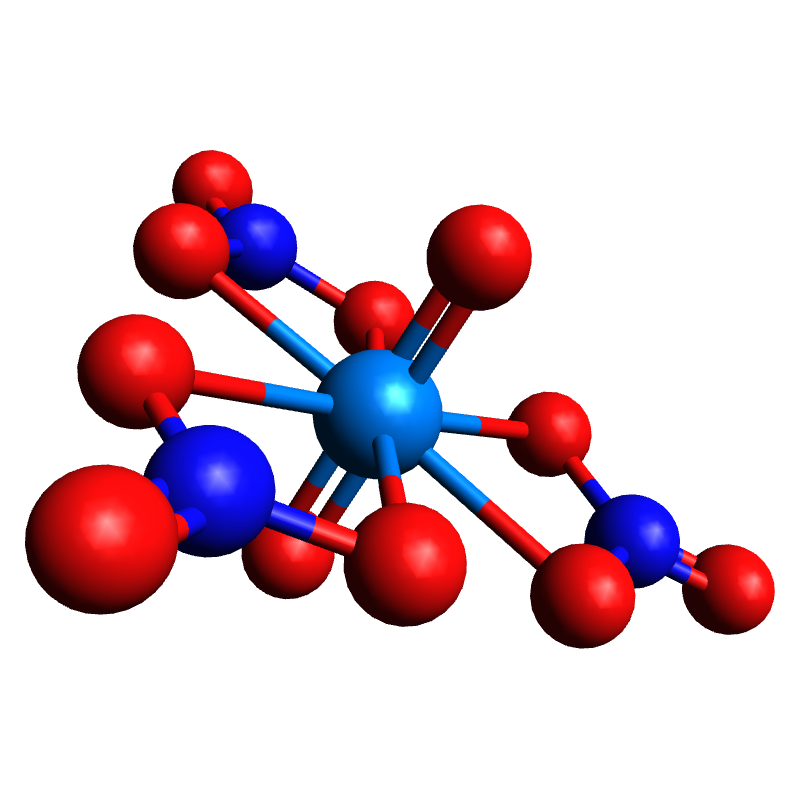

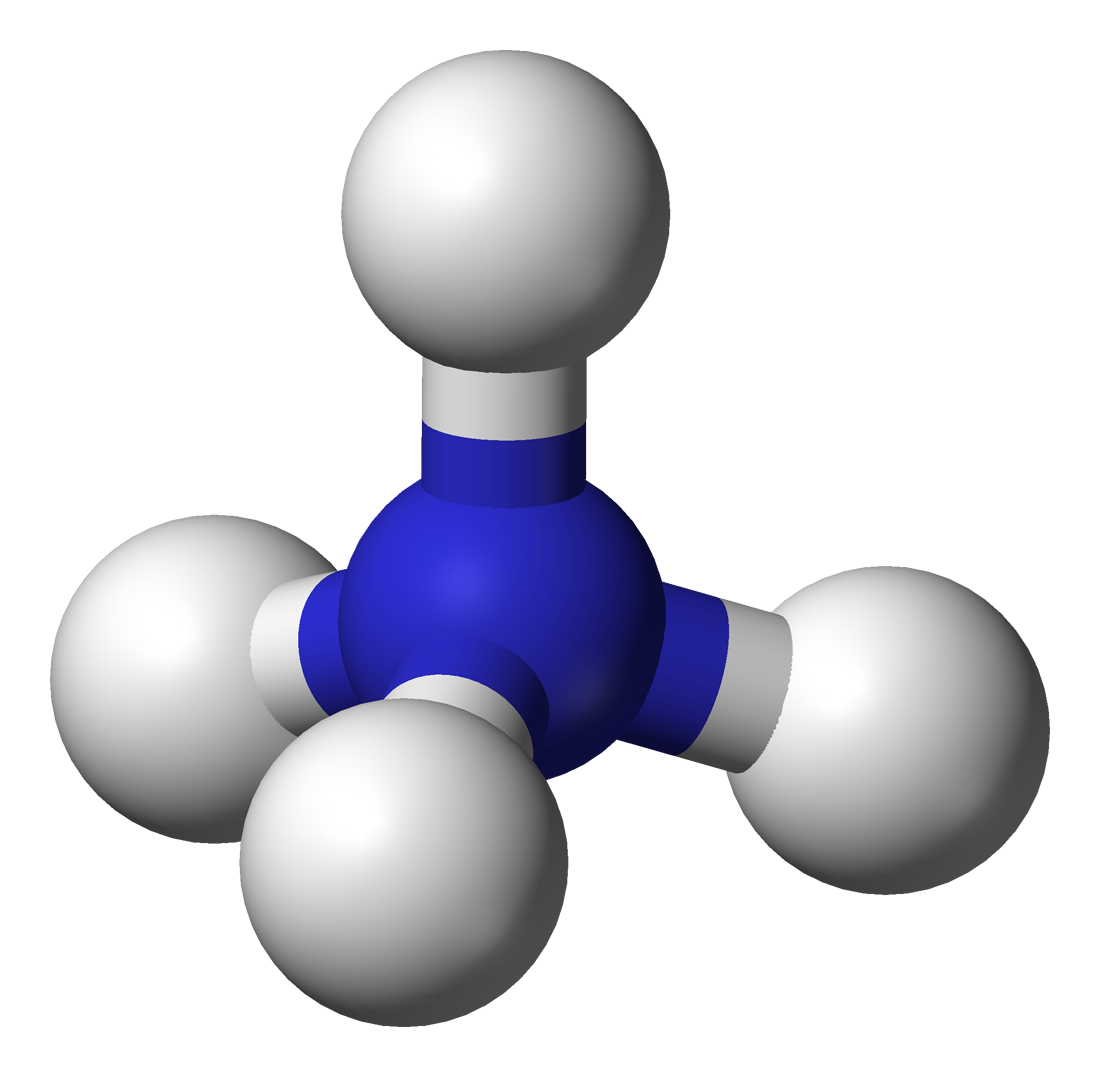

Identifiers
3D model (JSmol)	Interactive image
- InChI: InChI=1S/3NO3.H3N.Np.2O/c3*2-1(3)4;;;;/h;;;1H3;;;/q3*-1;;+2;;/p+1 Key: FHFCFUKSACQCMG-UHFFFAOYSA-N
- SMILES: [NH4+].O=[Np+2]=O.[O-]N(=O)=O.[O-]N(=O)=O.[O-]N(=O)=O

Properties
Chemical formula	NH_{4}NpO_{2}(NO_{3})_{3}
Molar mass	473 g·mol^{−1}
Appearance	Brown solid
Melting point	150 °C (302 °F; 423 K) (decomposes)

Structure
Crystal structure	Trigonal
Space group	R3̅c
Lattice constant	a = 9.1700 Å, b = 9.1700 Å, c = 18.902 Å α = 90.0°, β = 90.0°, γ = 120.0°
- Except where otherwise noted, data are given for materials in their standard state (at 25 °C [77 °F], 100 kPa). Infobox references

Neptunyl ammonium nitrate is a chemical compound with the chemical formula NH_{4}NpO_{2}(NO_{3})_{3}. It is prepared by dissolving neptunyl(VI) nitrate (NpO_{2}(NO_{3})_{2}·xH_{2}O) in nitric acid (HNO_{3}), addition of ammonium nitrate (NH_{4}NO_{3}), and evaporation of the solution. Its structure consists of ammonium (NH^{+}_{4}) cations, as well as NpO_{2}(NO_{3})^{−}_{3} anions, which contain a neptunyl (NpO^{2+}_{2}) group and three nitrate (NO^{−}_{3}) groups. Other, related compounds of the form MAnO_{2}(NO_{3})_{3} (M = NH_{4}, K, Rb, Cs, (CH_{3})_{4}N; An = U, Np, Pu) are prepared similarly, many of which adopt the same structure. Neptunyl ammonium nitrate decomposes at high temperatures, producing neptunium(V) oxide, Np_{2}O_{5}, and eventually neptunium(IV) oxide, NpO_{2}. It can be used to produce these neptunium oxides.

== Synthesis ==
Neptunyl ammonium nitrate is prepared from neptunyl(VI) nitrate, NpO_{2}(NO_{3})_{2}·xH_{2}O. One method of synthesizing this compound involves dissolution of neptunyl(V) hydroxide (NpO_{2}OH) with dilute nitric acid (HNO_{3}). Neptunium is then oxidized by bubbling the solution with ozone (O_{3}), and the solution is evaporated under nitrogen to produce neptunyl(VI) nitrate. NpO_{2}(NO_{3})_{2}·xH_{2}O can also be produced by adding concentrated nitric acid to a stock solution containing neptunium(V) or neptunium(VI). Neptunyl ammonium nitrate is produced upon dissolving neptunyl(VI) nitrate in nitric acid, adding ammonium nitrate, and letting the solution evaporate.

== Structure ==
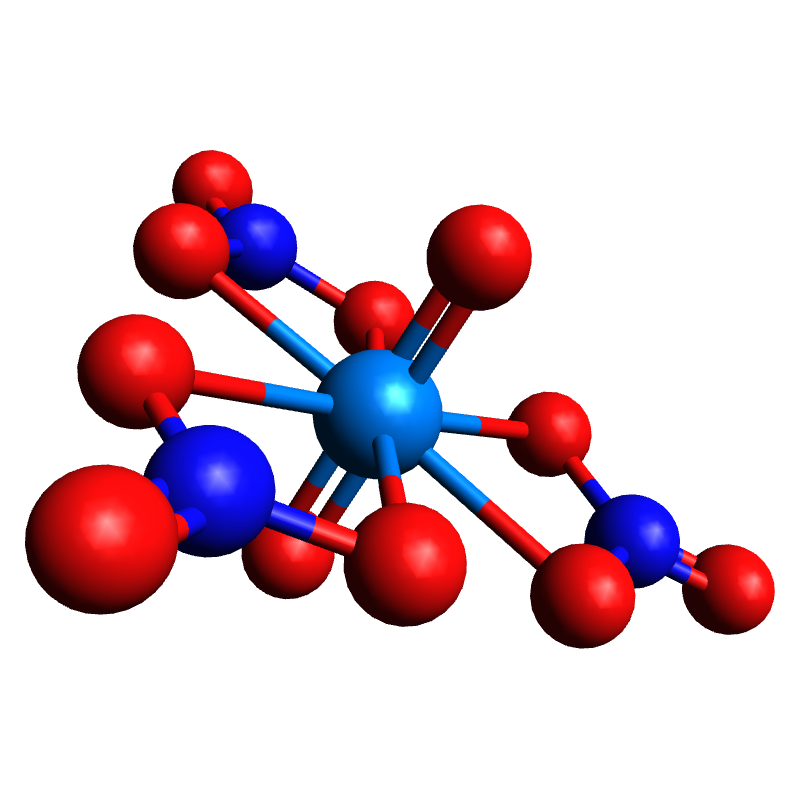
Diagram of the NpO_{2}(NO_{3})^{−}_{3} ion in neptunyl ammonium nitrate. Dark blue is nitrogen, light blue is neptunium, and red is oxygen.

Neptunyl ammonium nitrate adopts the same structure as many other actinide nitrate compounds with formulas MAnO_{2}(NO_{3})_{3} (M = NH_{4}, K, Rb, Cs; An = U, Np, Pu), with the exception of KUO_{2}(NO_{3})_{3}. It contains the NpO_{2}(NO_{3})^{−}_{3} ion, which has neptunium atoms bonded to three bidentate nitrate groups. Neptunium is in its +6 oxidation state, and is part of a neptunyl (NpO^{2+}_{2}) group. These neptunyl groups are linear, featuring a neptunium atom in the center forming triple bonds with two oxygen atoms. The bonds have a bond length of 1.748 Å. Neptunium atoms have a coordination geometry of hexagonal bipyramidal. The bond lengths between the neptunium atoms and the oxygen atoms within the nitrate groups are 2.467 Å. The nitrogen atoms within the ammonium groups lie directly between oxygen atoms in the neptunyl groups, with a O−N bond length of 2.97 Å. It is suggested that significant hydrogen bonding exists between the hydrogen atoms from ammonium and the oxygen atoms from neptunyl.

== Decomposition ==
Neptunyl ammonium nitrate decomposes at high temperatures in four steps. The first step, occurring at 150 °C, is exothermic. Because it releases ammonia, NH_{3}, suggesting the loss of ammonium, it is attributed to the loss of ammonium nitrate (NH_{4}NO_{3}) to form a neptunyl(VI) nitrate intermediate, NpO_{2}(NO_{3})_{2}. The next two steps, which are endothermic and occur at 250 °C and 300 °C, are attributed to decomposition of neptunyl(VI) nitrate. X-ray diffraction shows the result of these decomposition steps to be neptunium(V) oxide, Np_{2}O_{5}. It decomposes further at 575 °C, resulting in the final product of neptunium(IV) oxide, NpO_{2}.

== Uses ==
The thermal decomposition of neptunyl ammonium nitrate has been reported as a method for production of neptunium(IV) oxide, NpO_{2}, which is used as a target for production of plutonium-238. The decomposition has been studied to gain a better understanding of the decomposition of other neptunium ammonium nitrate double salts for the modified direct denitration process of producing NpO_{2}. Neptunyl ammonium nitrate can also be used to produce neptunium(V) oxide (Np_{2}O_{5}) through heating to 350 °C.

== Related compounds ==
Many other compounds with the formulas MAnO_{2}(NO_{3})_{3} (M = NH_{4}, K, Rb, Cs, (CH_{3})_{4}N; An = U, Np, Pu) are known. They are prepared similarly to NH_{4}NpO_{2}(NO_{3})_{3}; dissolution of the corresponding actinide nitrate, AnO_{2}(NO_{3})_{2}·xH_{2}O, with nitric acid (HNO_{3}), addition of MNO_{3}, and evaporation of the resulting solution produces these compounds. Most of them adopt the same structure as neptunyl ammonium nitrate, with the exception of KUO_{2}(NO_{3})_{3} and the (CH_{3})_{4}N compounds.
