= Triuranium heptoxide =

Identifiers
CAS Number	12037-04-6
3D model (JSmol)	Interactive image
- InChI: InChI=1S/7O.3U/q7*-2;+4;2*+5 Key: NREQYXJWNPMCDN-UHFFFAOYSA-N
- SMILES: [O-2].[O-2].[O-2].[O-2].[O-2].[O-2].[O-2].[U+4].[U+5].[U+5]

Properties
Chemical formula	U_{3}O_{7}
Molar mass	826.080 g·mol^{−1}

Related compounds
Other anions	Triuranium octoxide; Diuranium pentoxide; Uranium trioxide
- Except where otherwise noted, data are given for materials in their standard state (at 25 °C [77 °F], 100 kPa). Infobox references

Triuranium heptoxide is an inorganic compound of uranium and oxygen with the chemical formula U_{3}O_{7}.
