= Neptunium(III) bromide =

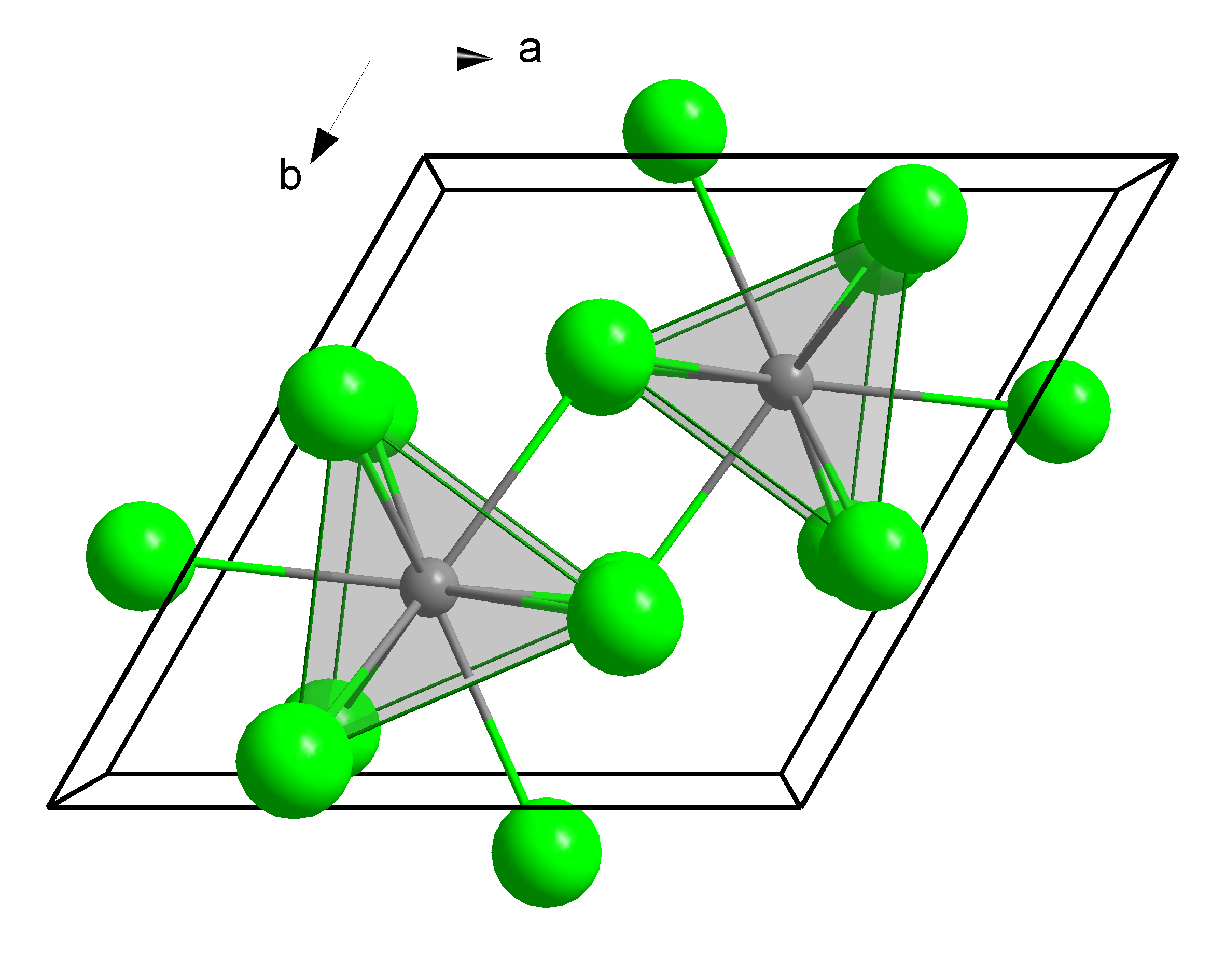

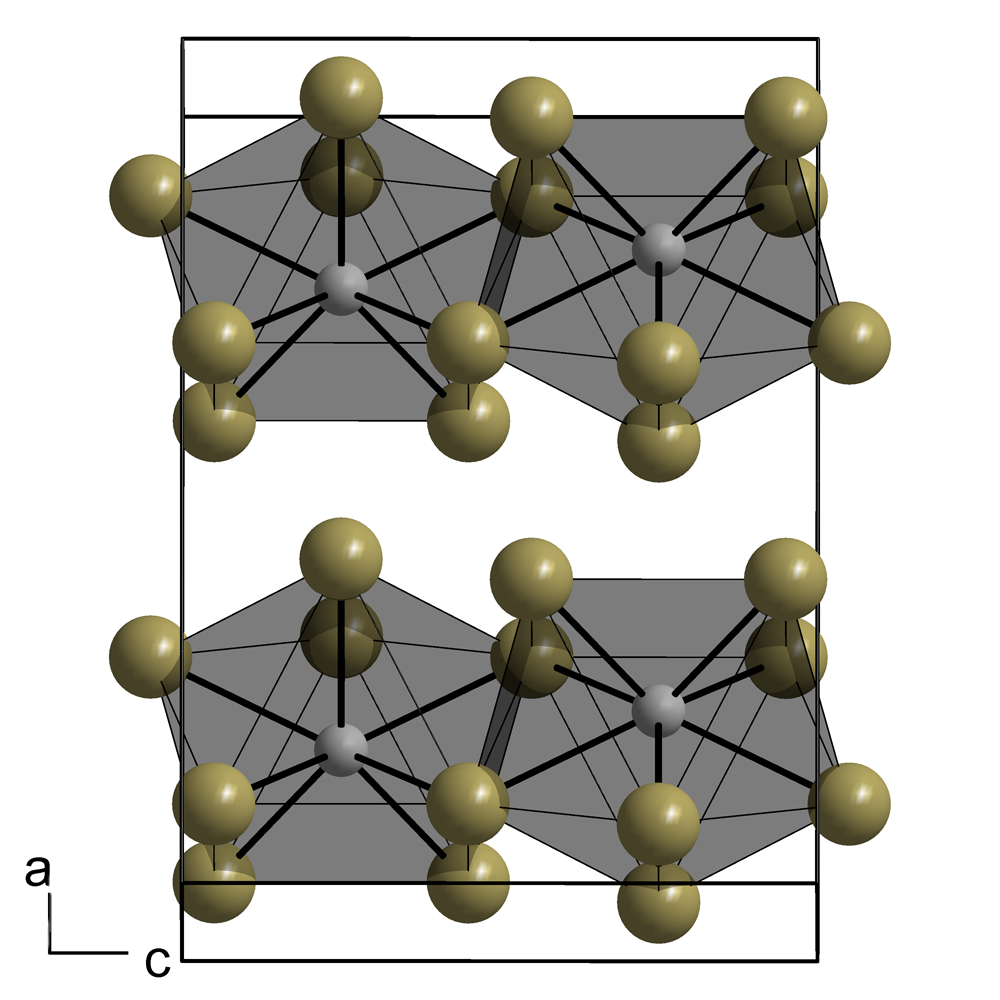

Identifiers
CAS Number	20730-39-6
3D model (JSmol)	Interactive image
- InChI: InChI=1S/3BrH.Np/h3*1H;/q;;;+3/p-3 Key: HVGILCLFCSGPEI-UHFFFAOYSA-K
- SMILES: [Np+3].[Br-].[Br-].[Br-]

Properties
Chemical formula	Br_{3}Np
Molar mass	477 g·mol^{−1}
Appearance	green solid
Density	6.62 g·cm^{−3}

Structure
Crystal structure	α-NpBr_{3}: hexagonal β-NpBr_{3}: orthorhombic
Space group	α-NpBr_{3}: P6_{3}/m (No. 176) β-NpBr_{3}: Ccmm (No. 63)
Lattice constant	a = 791.7 pm (α), 411 pm (β), b = 791.7 pm (α), 1265 pm (β), c = 438.2 pm (α), 915 pm (β)

Related compounds
Other anions	neptunium(III) fluoride neptunium(III) chloride neptunium(III) iodide
Other cations	uranium(III) bromide plutonium(III) bromide
Related compounds	neptunium(IV) bromide
- Except where otherwise noted, data are given for materials in their standard state (at 25 °C [77 °F], 100 kPa). Infobox references

Neptunium(III) bromide is a bromide of neptunium, with the chemical formula of NpBr_{3}.

== Preparation ==
Neptunium(III) bromide can be prepared by reacting neptunium dioxide and aluminium bromide:

6 NpO_{2} + 8 AlBr_{3} → 6 NpBr_{3} + 4 Al_{2}O_{3} + 3 Br_{2}

== Properties ==
Neptunium(III) bromide is a green solid. It can crystallize in two crystal systems:

- α-NpBr_{3} is hexagonal with lattice parameters a = 791.7 pm and c = 438.2 pm. It has the same structure as uranium trichloride.
- β-NpBr_{3} is orthorhombic with lattice parameters a = 411 pm, b = 1265 pm and c = 915 pm. It has the same structure as the bromides from plutonium to californium.

Neptunium(III) bromide also has a green hexahydrate, which is monoclinic.

=== Reactions ===
At 425 °C, neptunium(III) bromide can be further brominated by bromine to form neptunium(IV) bromide.

2 NpBr_{3} + Br_{2} → 2 NpBr_{4}

== External reading ==
- Yoshida, Zenko; Johnson, Stephen G.; Kimura, Takaumi; Krsul, John R. (2006), "Neptunium", in Morss, Lester R.; Edelstein, Norman M.; Fuger, Jean (eds.), The Chemistry of the Actinide and Transactinide Elements, Dordrecht: Springer Netherlands, pp. 699–812, doi:10.1007/1-4020-3598-5_6, ISBN 978-1-4020-3555-5
- Keller, C. (1969), "Die Chemie des Neptuniums", Anorganische Chemie, Fortschritte der Chemischen Forschung (in German), vol. 13/1, Berlin/Heidelberg: Springer-Verlag, pp. 1–124, doi:10.1007/bfb0051170, ISBN 978-3-540-04488-8
