= Neptunyl fluoride =

Names
- Other names: Neptunium(VI) fluoride oxide; Neptunium difluoride dioxide

Identifiers
| CAS Number | 18720-78-0 |
| 3D model (JSmol) | Interactive image |
- InChI: InChI=1S/2FH.Np.2O/h2*1H;;;/q;;+2;;/p-2 Key: BPVQATDOABEXKQ-UHFFFAOYSA-L
- SMILES: O=[Np](F)(F)=O

Properties
| Chemical formula | NpO_{2}F_{2} |
| Molar mass | 307 g·mol^{−1} |
| Appearance | pink solid |
| Solubility in water | soluble |

Related compounds
| Other cations | Plutonyl fluoride; Uranyl fluoride |
- Except where otherwise noted, data are given for materials in their standard state (at 25 °C [77 °F], 100 kPa). Infobox references

Neptunyl fluoride is an inorganic compound of neptunium, oxygen, and fluorine with the chemical formula NpO_{2}F_{2}.

== Synthesis ==
Neptunyl fluoride can be obtained by the reaction of the hydrated trioxide with gaseous HF and by direct fluorination of Np_{2}O_{5} at 350 °C or NpO_{3}·H_{2}O at 225 °C.

== Physical properties ==
The compound forms a pink solid of hexagonal crystal system, spatial group R3m. Soluble in water, insoluble in common organic solvents.
