= Neptunium tetrachloride =

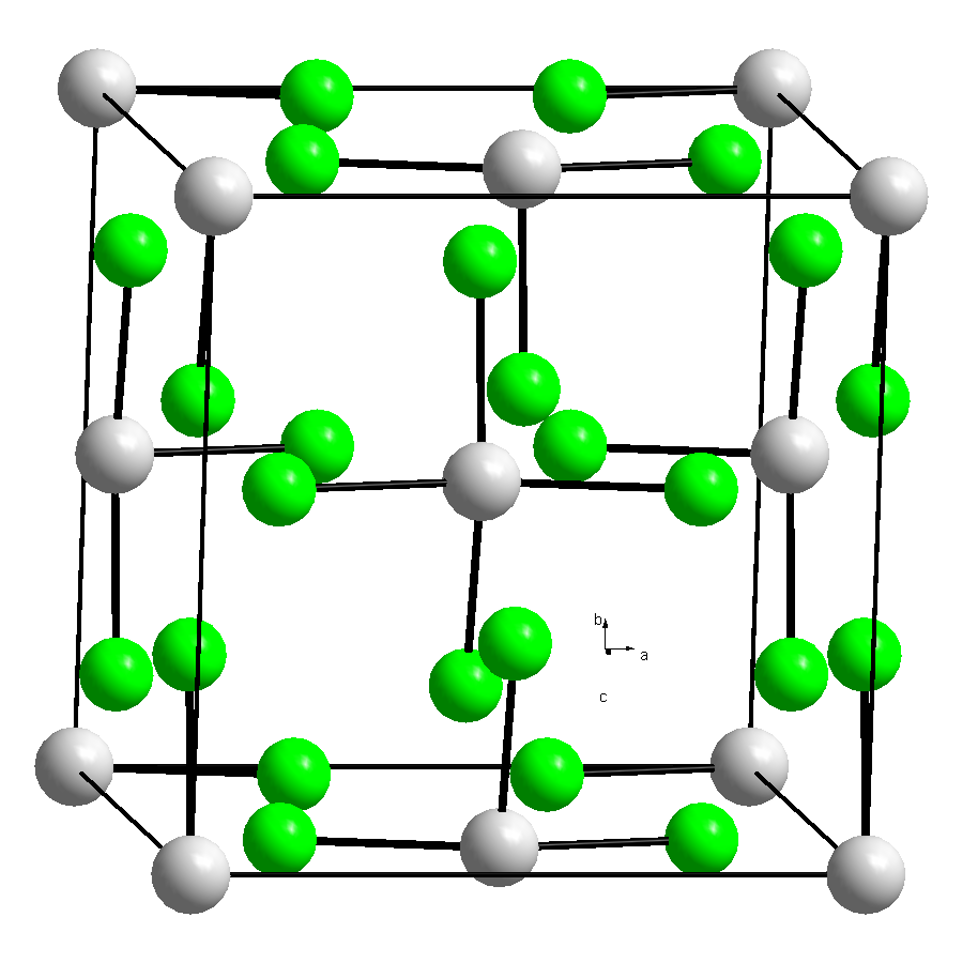

Identifiers
CAS Number	15597-84-9
3D model (JSmol)	Interactive image
- InChI: InChI=1S/4ClH.Np/h4*1H;/q;;;;+4/p-4 Key: XFAAJSLPXNXKKA-UHFFFAOYSA-J
- SMILES: [Np+4].[Cl-].[Cl-].[Cl-].[Cl-]

Properties
Chemical formula	Cl_{4}Np
Molar mass	379 g·mol^{−1}
Appearance	orange-brown crystals
Density	4.95 g/cm^{3}
Melting point	538 °C (1,000 °F; 811 K)

Related compounds
Related compounds	Uranium tetrachloride, Thorium tetrachloride
- Except where otherwise noted, data are given for materials in their standard state (at 25 °C [77 °F], 100 kPa). Infobox references

Neptunium tetrachloride is a binary inorganic compound of neptunium metal and chlorine with the chemical formula NpCl_{4}.

== Synthesis ==
The compound can be prepared by:

- the reaction of neptunium nitride with HCl:

2 NpN + 8 HCl → N_{2} + 4 H_{2} + 2 NpCl_{4}

- the reaction of neptunium sesquisulfide with HCl:

Np_{2}S_{3} + 8 HCl → 2 NpCl_{4} + 3 H_{2}S + H_{2}

- the reaction of carbon tetrachloride with neptunium(IV) oxide (NpO_{2}). Neptunium tetrachloride is formed as a yellow sublimate.

Other reactions are also used.

== Physical properties ==
NpCl_{4} crystallizes in tetragonal crystal system of space group I4/amd.

== Chemical properties ==
The compound reacts with ammonia to produce neptunium trichloride:

6 NpCl_{4} + 2 NH_{3} → 6 NpCl_{3} + 6 HCl + N_{2}

Neptunium tetrachloride can be reduced to neptunium trichloride by hydrogen at 450 °C.

2 NpCl_{4} + H_{2} → 2 NpCl_{3} + 2HCl

NpCl_{4} can form Lewis base adducts with non-protic solvents such as 1,2-dimethoxyethane (DME), pyridine and acetonitrile. These compounds are more accessible in practice than the binary NpCl_{4} salt. Solvates of the general formula NpCl_{4}L_{x} may thus be isolated. One starting material for metal-organic neptunium chemistry is NpCl_{4}(DME)_{2}, which can be isolated as a pink powder.

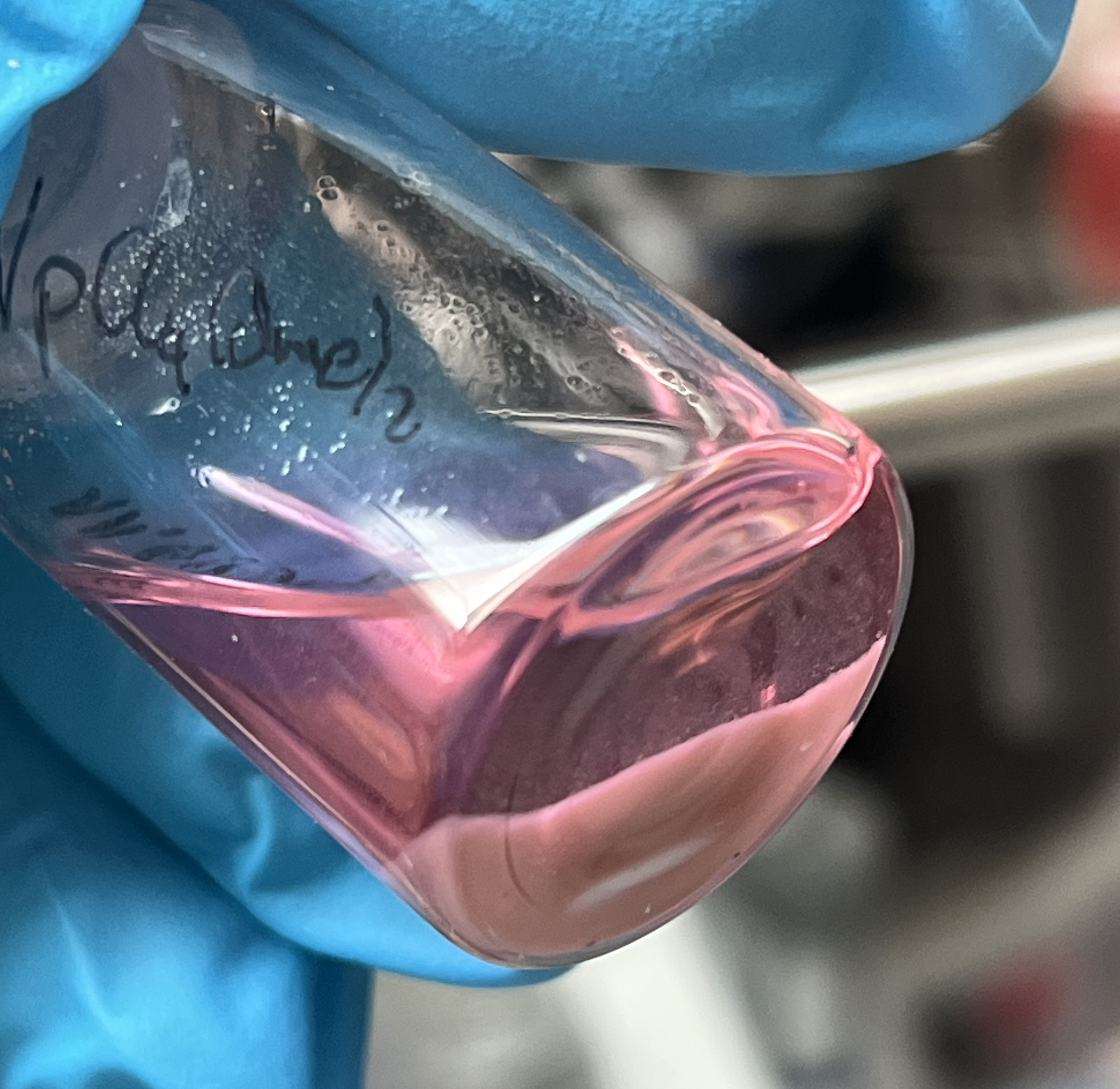
NpCl_{4}(DME)_{2} in 1,2-dimethoxyethane.
