= Neptunium(V) fluoride =

Names
- IUPAC name Neptunium(V) fluoride
- Other names Neptunium pentafluoride

Identifiers
CAS Number	31479-18-2
3D model (JSmol)	Interactive image
PubChem CID	165359232
CompTox Dashboard (EPA)	DTXSID701312633
- InChI: InChI=1S/5FH.Np/h5*1H;/q;;;;;+5/p-5 Key: QROYIGAVOZBRHJ-UHFFFAOYSA-I
- SMILES: F[Np](F)(F)(F)F

Properties
Chemical formula	NpF_{5}
Molar mass	332 g/mol
Appearance	Bluish-white solid
Melting point	318 °C (dec.)

Structure
Crystal structure	Tetragonal, tI12
Space group	I4/m, No. 87
Lattice constant	a = 0.65358 nm, c = 0.44562 nm
Lattice volume (V)	0.1904 nm^{3}
Formula units (Z)	2

Thermochemistry
Heat capacity (C)	133 ± 8 J/mol·K
Std molar entropy (S^{⦵}_{298})	200 ± 15 J/mol·K
Std enthalpy of formation (Δ_{f}H^{⦵}_{298})	−1941 ± 25 kJ/mol
Gibbs free energy (Δ_{f}G^{⦵})	−1834 ± 25 kJ/mol
- Except where otherwise noted, data are given for materials in their standard state (at 25 °C [77 °F], 100 kPa). Infobox references

Neptunium(V) fluoride or neptunium pentafluoride is a chemical compound of neptunium and fluorine with the formula NpF_{5}.

== Synthesis ==
Neptunium(V) fluoride can be prepared by reacting neptunium(VI) fluoride with iodine:

10 NpF_{6} + I_{2} → 10 NpF_{5} + 2 IF_{5}

From the equation above, iodine pentafluoride is a byproduct.

== Properties ==
Neptunium(V) fluoride thermally decomposes at 318 °C to produce neptunium(IV) fluoride and neptunium(VI) fluoride. Contrary to uranium(V) fluoride, neptunium(V) fluoride does not react with boron trichloride, but it reacts with lithium fluoride in anhydrous HF to produce LiNpF_{6}.
