= Neptunium(V) oxide =

Chemical compound

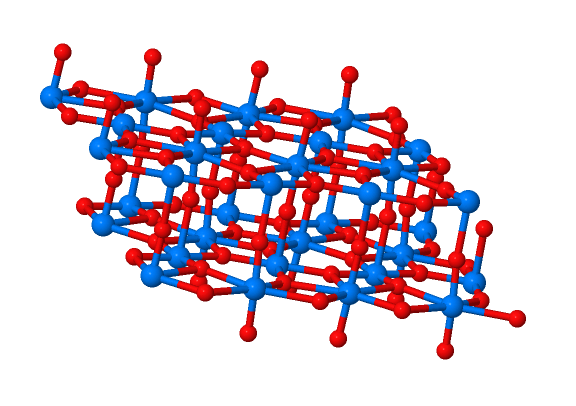

Names
- IUPAC name Neptunium(V) oxide
- Other names Neptunium pentoxide Dineptunium pentoxide

Identifiers
3D model (JSmol)	Interactive image
- InChI: InChI=1S/2Np.5O/q2*+5;5*-2 Key: MOPDXFDBEISTFG-UHFFFAOYSA-N
- SMILES: [Np+5].[Np+5].[O-2].[O-2].[O-2].[O-2].[O-2]

Properties
Chemical formula	Np_{2}O_{5}
Molar mass	554.09 g/mol
Appearance	Green crystals
Density	8.18 g/cm^{3}
Melting point	427 °C; 800 °F; 700 K (decomposes)
Solubility in water	Insoluble

Related compounds
Other anions	Neptunium(V) fluoride
Other cations	Protactinium(V) oxide Uranium(V) oxide
Related neptunium oxides	Neptunium(IV) oxide
- Except where otherwise noted, data are given for materials in their standard state (at 25 °C [77 °F], 100 kPa). Infobox references

Neptunium(V) oxide or neptunium pentoxide is one of two solid oxides of neptunium, the other being neptunium(IV) oxide. It has a chemical formula of Np_{2}O_{5}.

== History ==
Neptunium(V) oxide was first synthesized in 1963 by passing ozone through molten lithium perchlorate containing neptunyl(V) ions and precipitating the product.

== Synthesis ==
Neptunium(V) oxide can be formed from the calcination of other compounds of neptunium, such as neptunium(VI) oxide (NpO_{3}·xH_{2}O), neptunyl(V) hydroxide (NpO_{2}OH), neptunyl(VI) hydroxide (NpO_{2}(OH)_{2}), or neptunium(V) nitrates (NpO(NO_{3})_{3} or NpO_{2}NO_{3}). It can also be synthesized via hydrothermal means.

== Reactions ==
Neptunium(V) oxide is unstable, and decomposes between 700 and 973 K, forming neptunium(IV) oxide and oxygen gas:

Np_{2}O_{5} → 2 NpO_{2} + 1/_{2} O_{2}

Np_{2}O_{5} produced from the calcination of neptunyl(VI) hydroxide goes through an intermediate phase Np_{4}O_{9} before reaching NpO_{2}.

== Structure ==
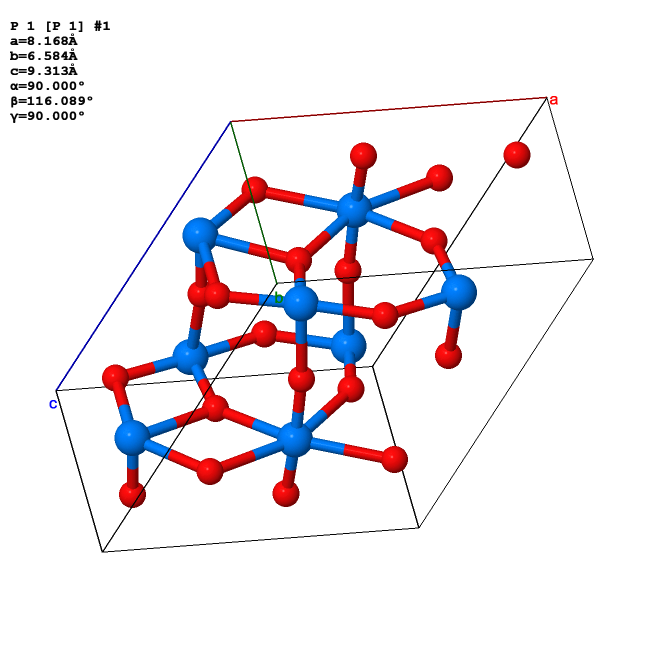
A single unit cell of Np_{2}O_{5}.

Neptunium(V) oxide adopts a layered structure. Corresponding neptunium atoms in different layers are bridged by oxygen atoms, forming chains of neptunyl cations. Within each layer, neptunyl cations are linked by oxygen atoms.

The crystal structure of neptunium(V) oxide contains three distinct neptunium sites. Two sites have a coordination geometry of pentagonal bipyramidal, and the other has a coordination geometry of tetragonal bipyramidal.

Neptunium(V) oxide crystals are monoclinic, with space group P2/c, four formula units per unit cell, and unit cell dimensions a=8.17Å, b=6.58Å, c=9.313Å, and β=116.09°. They have a density of 8.18 g/cm^{3}.

== Other properties ==
Neptunium(V) oxide undergoes antiferromagnetic ordering at 22 K.
