= Neptunium(III) chloride =

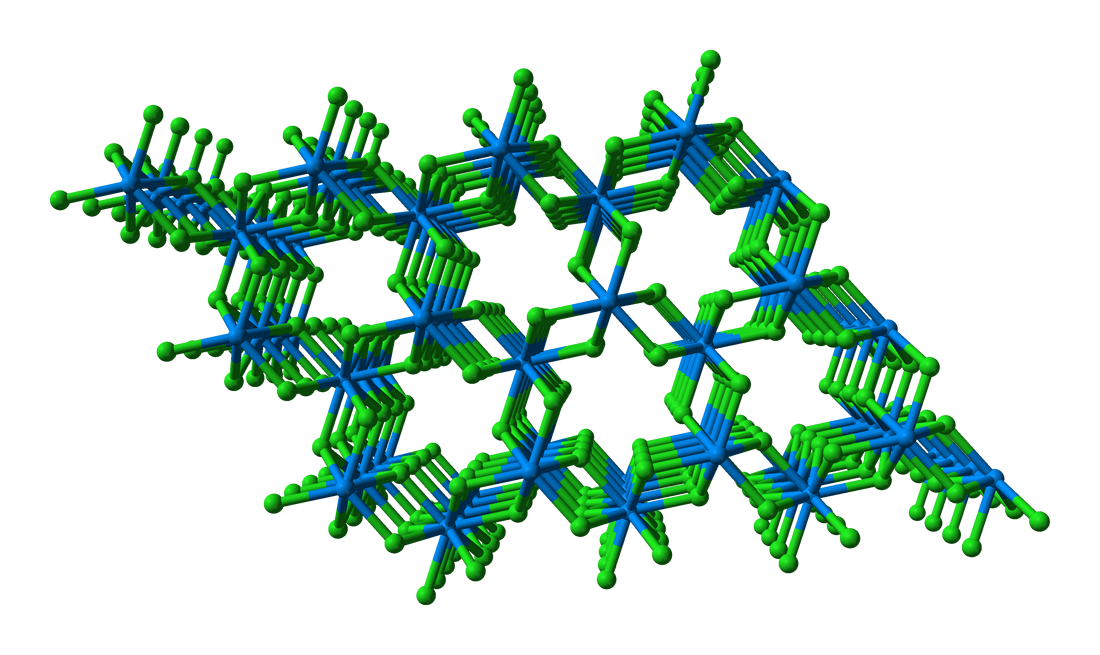
- Ball-and-stick model of the crystal structure of neptunium(III) chloride

Names
- IUPAC name Neptunium(III) chloride
- Other names Neptunium trichloride

Identifiers
CAS Number	20737-06-8
3D model (JSmol)	Interactive image
PubChem CID	71402371
CompTox Dashboard (EPA)	DTXSID601336577
- InChI: InChI=1S/3ClH.Np/h3*1H;/q;;;+3/p-3 Key: YCRHCDNZKKGRFF-UHFFFAOYSA-K
- SMILES: [Cl-].[Np+3].[Cl-].[Cl-]

Properties
Chemical formula	NpCl_{3}
Molar mass	343.41 g/mol
Appearance	green solid
Melting point	797 °C (1,467 °F; 1,070 K)

Related compounds
Other anions	Neptunium(III) fluoride Neptunium(III) bromide Neptunium(III) iodide
Other cations	Uranium(III) chloride Plutonium(III) chloride Americium(III) chloride
- Except where otherwise noted, data are given for materials in their standard state (at 25 °C [77 °F], 100 kPa). Infobox references

Neptunium(III) chloride or neptunium trichloride is a chemical compound of neptunium and chlorine with the chemical formula NpCl_{3}. It is hygroscopic, absorbing moisture in air to form a hydrate. Hydrates can also be formed from solutions. The anhydrous form can be prepared in several ways, many involving the reduction of neptunium(IV) chloride (NpCl_{4}), though other reactions can be used as well. It can be used in molten-salt reactors, and it is paramagnetic.

Anhydrous neptunium(III) chloride adopts the same hexagonal structure as uranium(III) chloride. The structure of its hydrates are apparently unknown, but it is predicted that it will form a hydrate of composition NpCl_{3}·7H_{2}O with the same structure as corresponding lanthanide compounds. Neptunium(III) chloride forms adducts with ligands such as pyridine (py; C_{5}H_{5}N), with the formula NpCl_{3}(py)_{4}. This adduct is a useful starting material for preparation of other neptunium compounds.

== Synthesis ==
=== Hydrate ===
Neptunium(III) chloride hydrates can be produced from a neptunium chloride solution, prepared from dissolving neptunium compounds in hydrochloric acid (HCl). A reducing agent like hydroxylammonium chloride ([NH_{3}OH]Cl) has to be added to convert neptunium to the +3 oxidation state. The hydrates precipitate upon letting the solution evaporate until dry. Hydrates are also formed by the reaction of anhydrous neptunium(III) chloride with moisture.

=== Anhydrous ===
Anhydrous neptunium(III) chloride can be made by reacting neptunium(III) chloride hydrate that has been precipitated from solution with thionyl chloride (SOCl_{2}). It is separated from SOCl_{2} by heating the product in a vacuum. Hydrate reaction with thionyl chloride proceeds like so:

NpCl_{3}·xH_{2}O + x SOCl_{2} → NpCl_{3} + x SO_{2} + 2x HCl

Neptunium(III) chloride is also produced from the reduction of neptunium(IV) chloride (NpCl_{4}). Neptunium(IV) chloride can be prepared by the reaction of neptunium(IV) oxide (NpO_{2}) with carbon tetrachloride (CCl_{4}) or a combination of chlorine gas (Cl_{2}) and CCl_{4}. Alternatively, neptunium(IV) oxalate (Np(C_{2}O_{4})_{2}) can be reacted with CCl_{4} to make NpCl_{4}. Oxide reaction with CCl_{4} proceeds like so:

NpO_{2} + 2 CCl_{4} → NpCl_{4} + 2 COCl_{2}

Reduction of NpCl_{4} with hydrogen gas (H_{2}), ammonia (NH_{3}), or zinc yields neptunium(III) chloride. Reacting neptunium(IV) oxide with a mixture of CCl_{4} and hydrogen gas produces NpCl_{3} as well.

2 NpCl_{4} + H_{2} → 2 NpCl_{3} + 2 HCl
6 NpCl_{4} + 2 NH_{3} → 6 NpCl_{3} + 6 HCl + N_{2}

Carbon tetrachloride is corrosive, so other reagents may be used instead. For example, reaction of neptunium nitride (NpN) with cadmium chloride (CdCl_{2}) by heating a ground mixture of the two compounds produces neptunium(III) chloride:

2 NpN + 3 CdCl_{2} → 2 NpCl_{3} + 3 Cd + N_{2}

== Properties ==
Like other actinide(III) chlorides, neptunium(III) chloride is hygroscopic, absorbing moisture from the air to form a hydrate. While information as to the composition of neptunium(III) chloride hydrates is unavailable, comparisons with lanthanide trichlorides suggest that NpCl_{3} should form a heptahydrate (NpCl_{3}·7H_{2}O) based on neptunium's ionic radius. Below 50 K, neptunium(III) chloride exhibits temperature-independent paramagnetism, and at higher temperatures, it shows Curie–Weiss paramagnetism.

== Structure ==
Anhydrous neptunium(III) chloride possesses the uranium(III) chloride-type crystal structure. This structure is hexagonal. It features neptunium bonding with nine chlorine atoms, where neptunium has a coordination geometry of tricapped trigonal prismatic; six chlorine atoms form a triangular prism around the neptunium atom, and the remaining three cap off the rectangular faces. The bases of the prisms join together to form infinite chains.

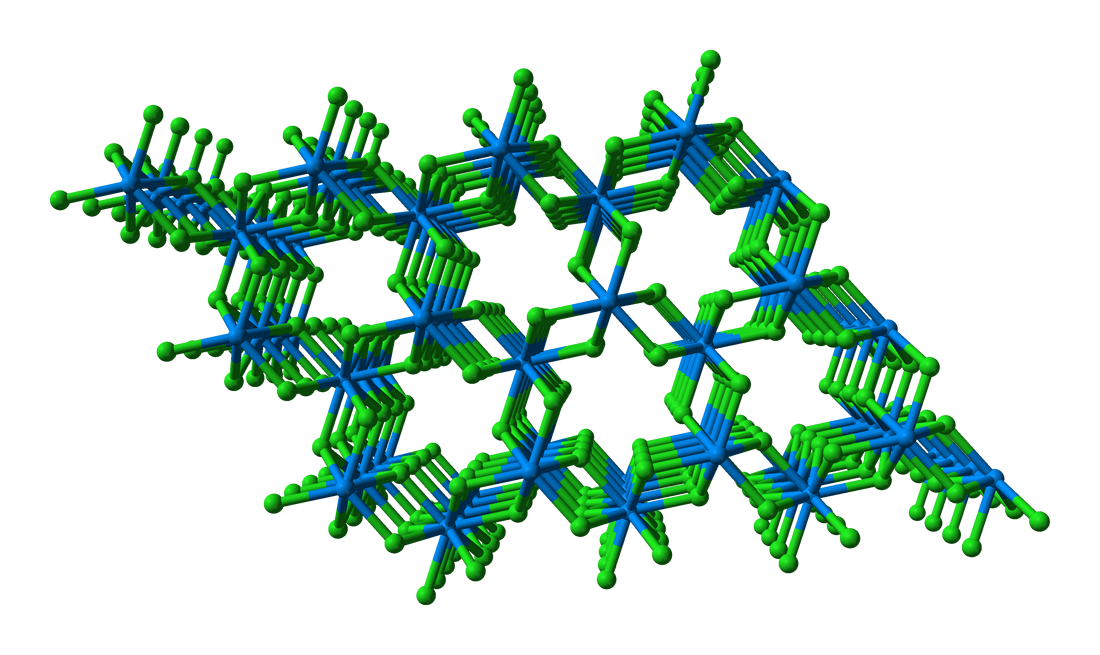
The crystal structure of NpCl_{3}. Blue is neptunium, green is chlorine.

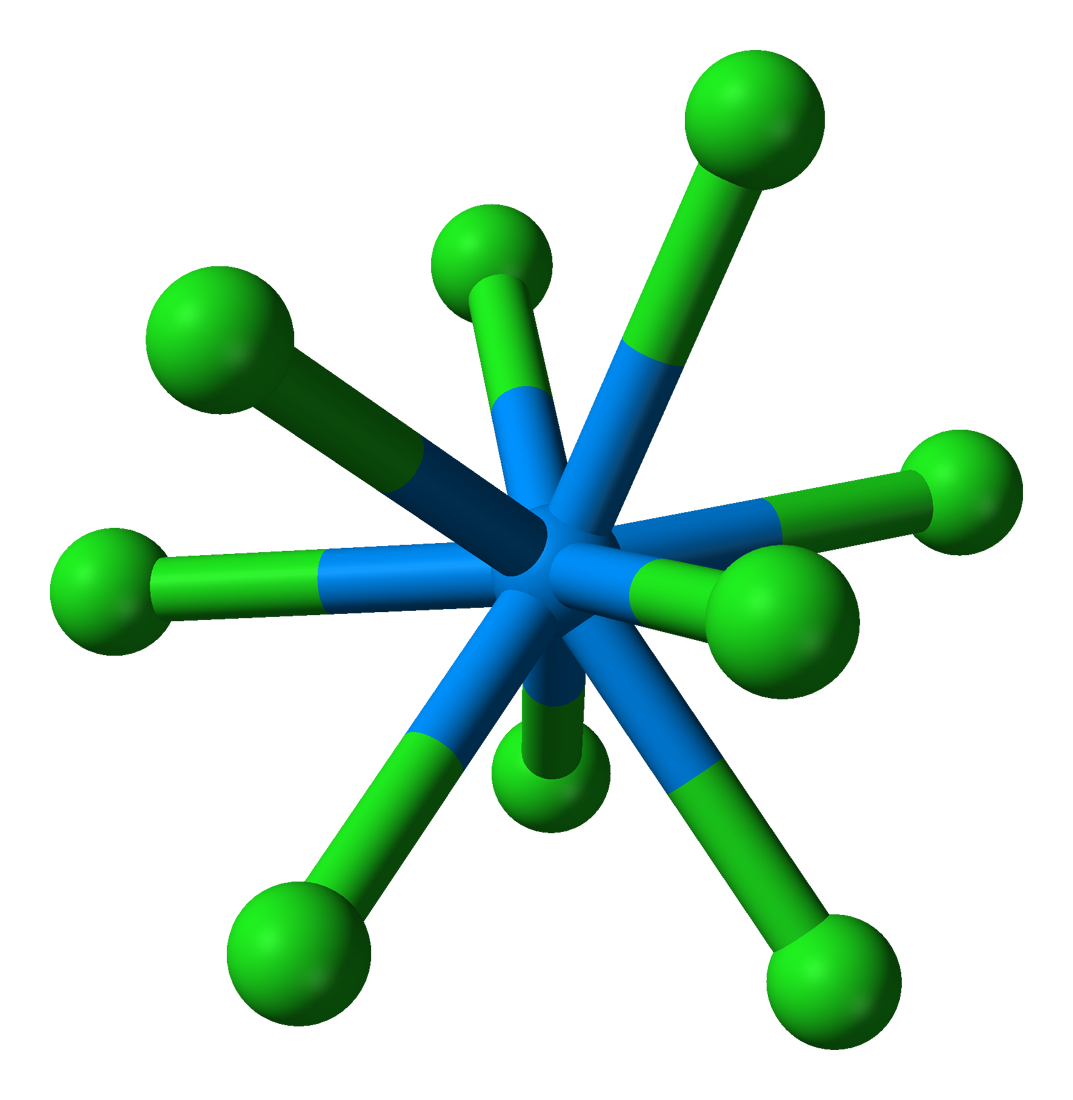
The coordination sphere of each neptunium atom in the structure of NpCl_{3}. Blue is neptunium, green is chlorine.

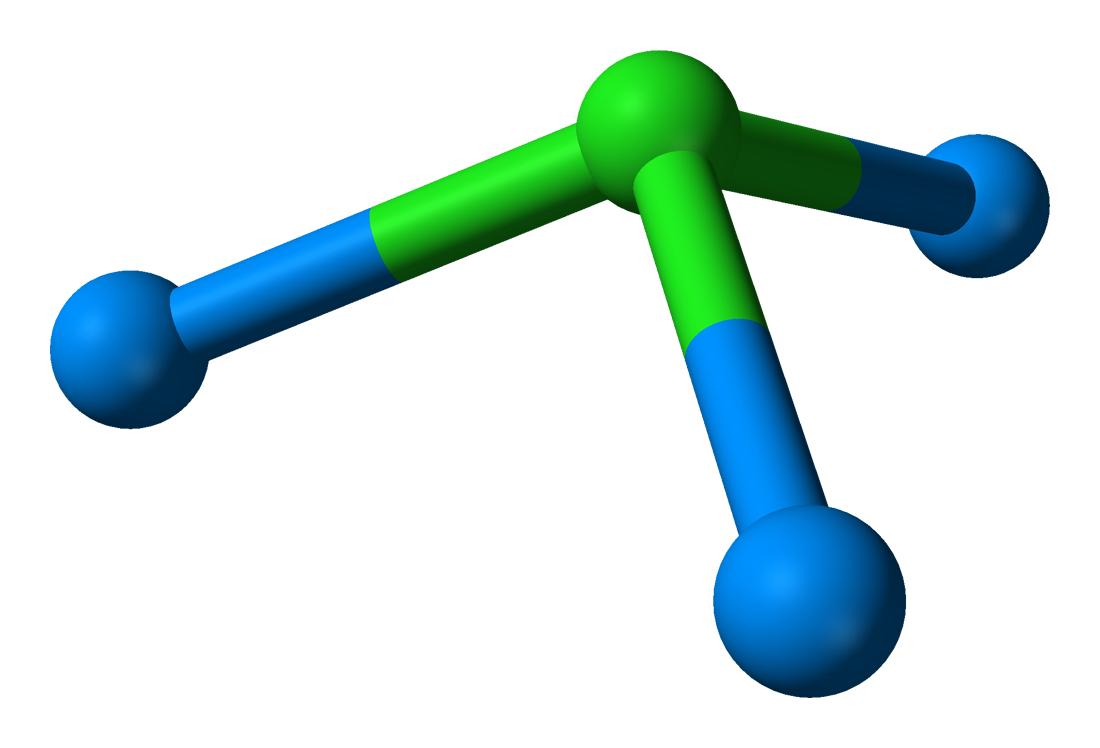
The coordination sphere of each chlorine atom in the structure of NpCl_{3}. Blue is neptunium, green is chlorine.

As for hydrates, neptunium(III) chloride is predicted to form a heptahydrate, NpCl_{3}·7H_{2}O, which would be isostructural with corresponding lanthanide compounds. These compounds consist of dimeric units of formula M_{2}Cl_{2}(H_{2}O)^{4+}_{14} (M=metal), which feature each metal atom bonded to seven water molecules. Two chloride ions bridge the metal centers. These units are linked together by additional chloride ions, which bond to the water molecules through hydrogen bonds. This structure can be represented as [(H_{2}O)_{7}M(μ_{2}-Cl_{2})M(H_{2}O)^{4+}_{7}]Cl_{4}.

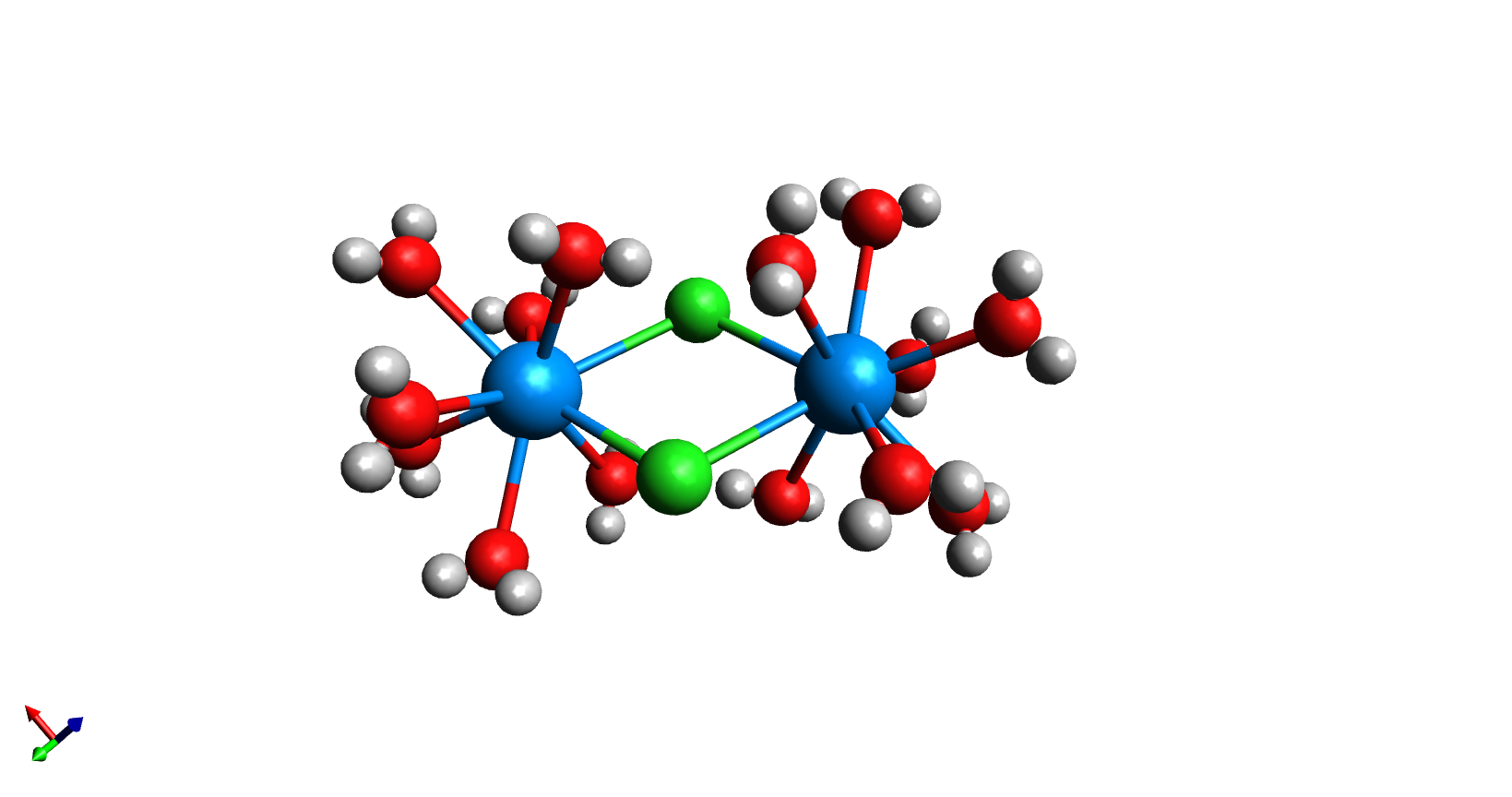
A model of the Np_{2}Cl_{2}(H_{2}O)^{4+}_{14} ion, as found in the predicted structure of NpCl_{3}·7H_{2}O. Blue is neptunium, green is chloride, red is oxygen, and white is hydrogen.

== Complexes ==
=== With pyridine ===
An adduct of neptunium(III) chloride with pyridine (C_{5}H_{5}N), with the composition NpCl_{3}(py)_{4} (py = pyridine) is known. The synthesis of this compound starts from the dimethoxyethane adduct of neptunium(IV) chloride, NpCl_{4}(DME)_{2} (DME = dimethoxyethane). Dissolving this compound in tetrahydrofuran (C_{4}H_{8}O; THF) produces a tetrahydrofuran adduct, NpCl_{4}(THF)_{3}. Reducing this compound with caesium graphite forms a yellow powder, presumably NpCl_{3}(THF)_{x}. Dissolving this compound in pyridine and subsequently in ethyl ether, (C_{2}H_{5})_{2}O, affords the pyridine adduct. This compound is a useful starting material for synthesizing other neptunium compounds, such as those where neptunium is in the +3 oxidation state.

== Uses ==
Neptunium(III) chloride can be used in molten-salt reactors, a type of nuclear reactor in which the fuel and/or the coolant is a molten salt. In this case, neptunium(III) chloride is used as the fuel. Neptunium(III) chloride is combined with other salts, like other actinide chlorides or halides of alkali metals.
