= Neptunium(III) iodide =

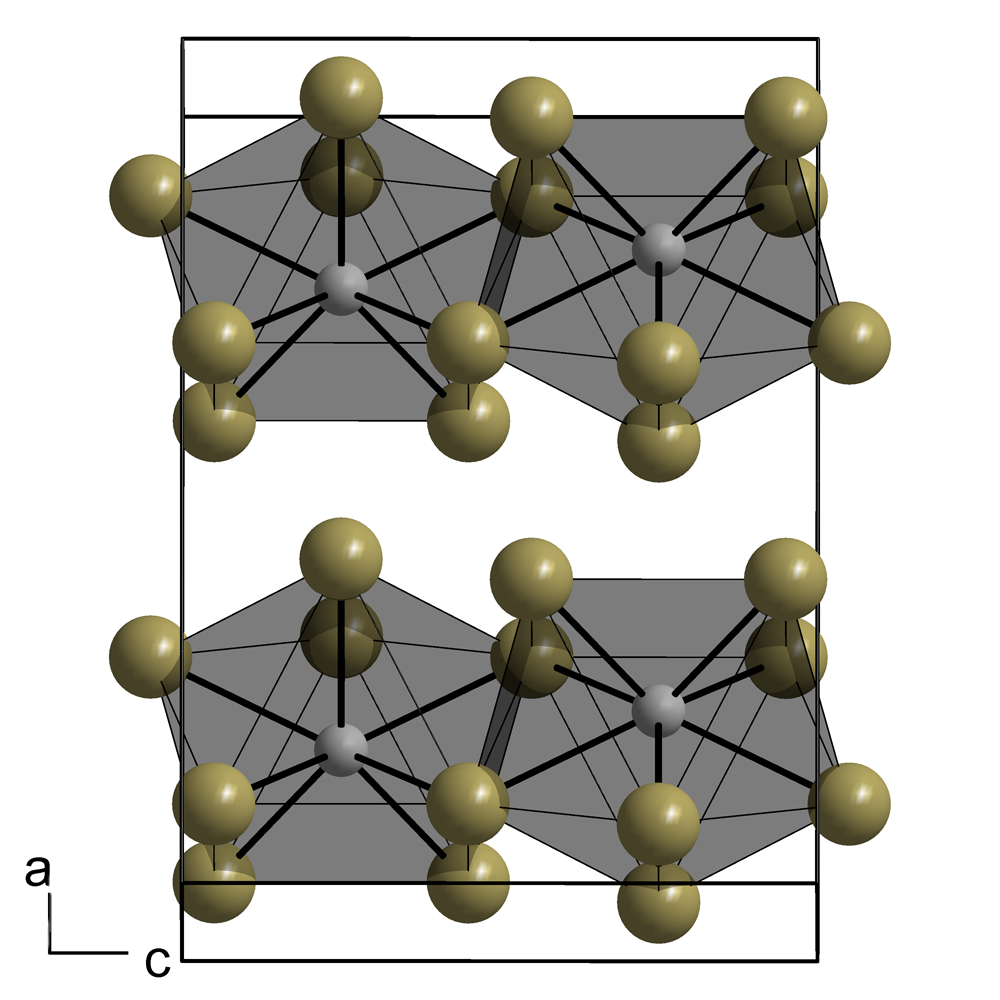

Identifiers
CAS Number	37501-52-3
3D model (JSmol)	Interactive image
PubChem CID	145816493
- InChI: InChI=1S/3HI.Np/h3*1H;/q;;;+3/p-3 Key: CZAMOQBPJFUDFF-UHFFFAOYSA-K
- SMILES: [I-].[I-].[I-].[Np+3]

Properties
Chemical formula	I_{3}Np
Molar mass	618 g·mol^{−1}
Appearance	brown solid
Density	6.82 g·cm^{−3}
Melting point	767 °C

Structure
Crystal structure	orthorhombic
Space group	Ccmm (No. 63)
Lattice constant	a = 430 pm, b = 1403 pm, c = 995 pm

Related compounds
Other anions	neptunium(III) fluoride neptunium(III) chloride neptunium(III) bromide
Other cations	uranium(III) iodide plutonium(III) iodide
- Except where otherwise noted, data are given for materials in their standard state (at 25 °C [77 °F], 100 kPa). Infobox references

Neptunium(III) iodide is the iodide of neptunium with the chemical formula NpI_{3}.

== Preparation ==
Neptunium(III) iodide can be produced by the reaction of neptunium dioxide and aluminium iodide:

6 NpO_{2} + 8 AlI_{3} → 6 NpI_{3} + 4 Al_{2}O_{3} + 3 I_{2}

== Properties ==
Neptunium(III) iodide is a hygroscopic brown solid with a melting point of 767 °C. It is orthorhombic (plutonium(III) bromide structure), space group Ccmm (No. 63), lattice parameters a = 430pm, b = 1403pm and c = 995pm.

== External reading ==
- Yoshida, Zenko; Johnson, Stephen G.; Kimura, Takaumi; Krsul, John R. (2006), "Neptunium", in Morss, Lester R.; Edelstein, Norman M.; Fuger, Jean (eds.), The Chemistry of the Actinide and Transactinide Elements, Dordrecht: Springer Netherlands, pp. 699–812, doi:10.1007/1-4020-3598-5_6, ISBN 978-1-4020-3555-5
- Keller, C. (1969), "Die Chemie des Neptuniums", Anorganische Chemie, Fortschritte der Chemischen Forschung (in German), vol. 13/1, Berlin/Heidelberg: Springer-Verlag, pp. 1–124, doi:10.1007/bfb0051170, ISBN 978-3-540-04488-8
