= Diuranium pentoxide =

Identifiers
| CAS Number | 12065-66-6 |
| 3D model (JSmol) | Interactive image |
| ChemSpider | 4415799 |
| PubChem CID | 5248017 |
- InChI: InChI=1S/5O.2U Key: FHWQTGBLQGZPJN-UHFFFAOYSA-N
- SMILES: O=[U](=O)O[U](=O)=O

Properties
| Chemical formula | U_{2}O_{5} |
| Molar mass | 556.055 g/mol |
| Appearance | black crystal |

Related compounds
| Other anions | Uranium pentafluoride Uranium pentachloride |
| Other cations | Protactinium(V) oxide Neptunium(V) oxide |
| Related uranium oxides | Uranium dioxide Triuranium octoxide Uranium trioxide |
- Except where otherwise noted, data are given for materials in their standard state (at 25 °C [77 °F], 100 kPa). Infobox references

Diuranium pentoxide (uranium(V) oxide) is an inorganic chemical compound of uranium and oxygen.
