= Neptunium tetrabromide =

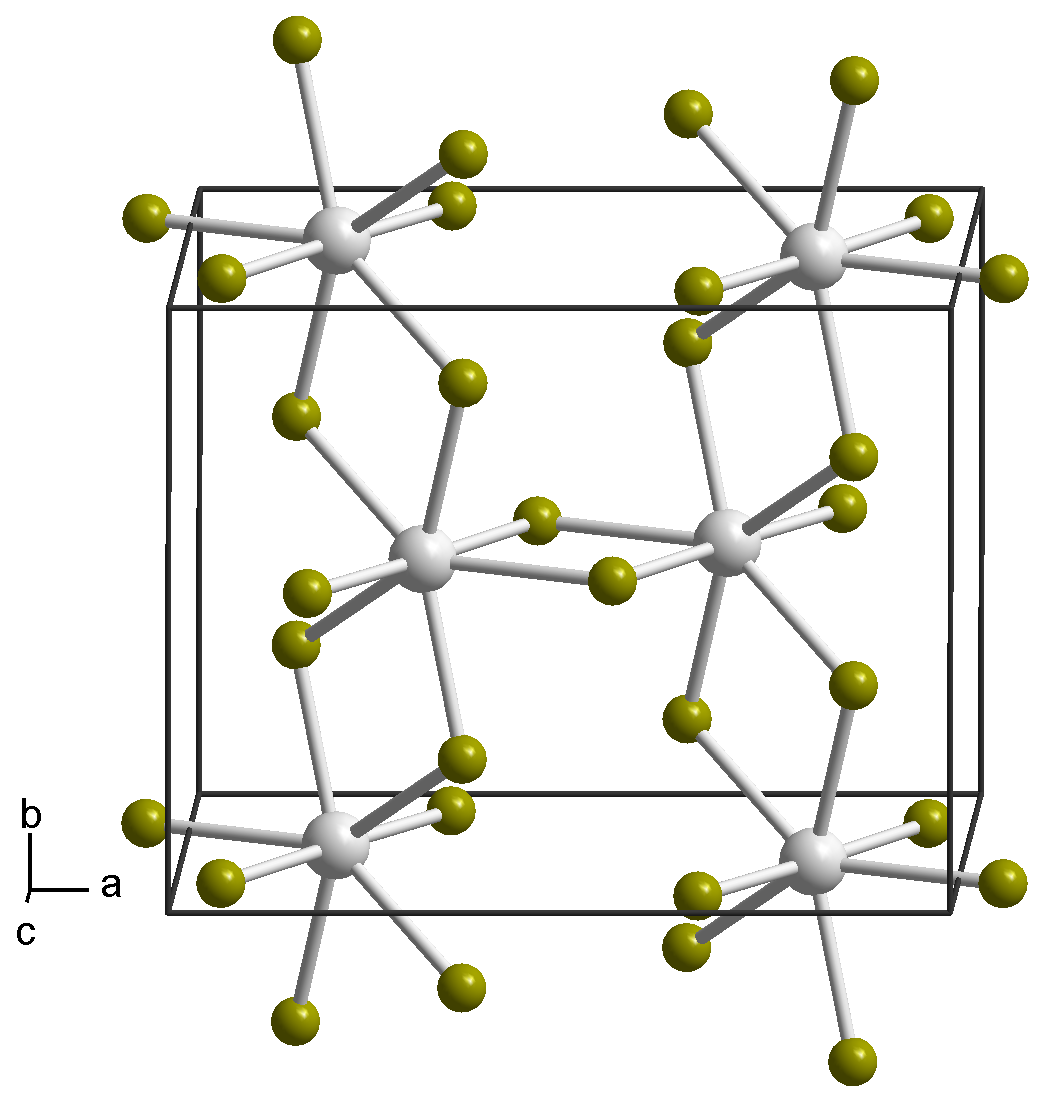

Names
- Other names neptunium(IV) bromide

Identifiers
CAS Number	15608-32-9
3D model (JSmol)	Interactive image
- InChI: InChI=1S/4BrH.Np/h4*1H;/q;;;;+4/p-4 Key: HUNTZSUKDFZQIP-UHFFFAOYSA-J
- SMILES: [Np+4].[Br-].[Br-].[Br-].[Br-]

Properties
Chemical formula	Br_{4}Np
Molar mass	557 g·mol^{−1}
Appearance	red-brown crystals
Density	5.5 g/cm^{3}
Melting point	464 °C (867 °F; 737 K)

Related compounds
Related compounds	Uranium tetrabromide, Thorium tetrabromide
- Except where otherwise noted, data are given for materials in their standard state (at 25 °C [77 °F], 100 kPa). Infobox references

Neptunium tetrabromide is a binary inorganic compound of neptunium metal and bromine with the chemical formula NpBr_{4}.

== Synthesis ==
The compound can be prepared from the reaction of bromine with metallic neptunium:

Np + 2Br_{2} → NpBr_{4}

Also, a reaction of aluminum bromide with neptunium(IV) oxide:

3NpO_{2} + 4AlBr_{3} → 3NpBr_{4} + 2Al_{2}O_{3}

== Physical properties ==
Neptunium tetrabromide forms red-brown hygroscopic crystals of monoclinic crystal system, spatial group P 2/c, cell parameters a = 1.089 nm, b = 0.874 nm, c = 0.705 nm, β = 95.19°, Z = 4.

NpBr_{4} is easily purified by sublimation in a vacuum.
