= Neptunium(IV) fluoride =

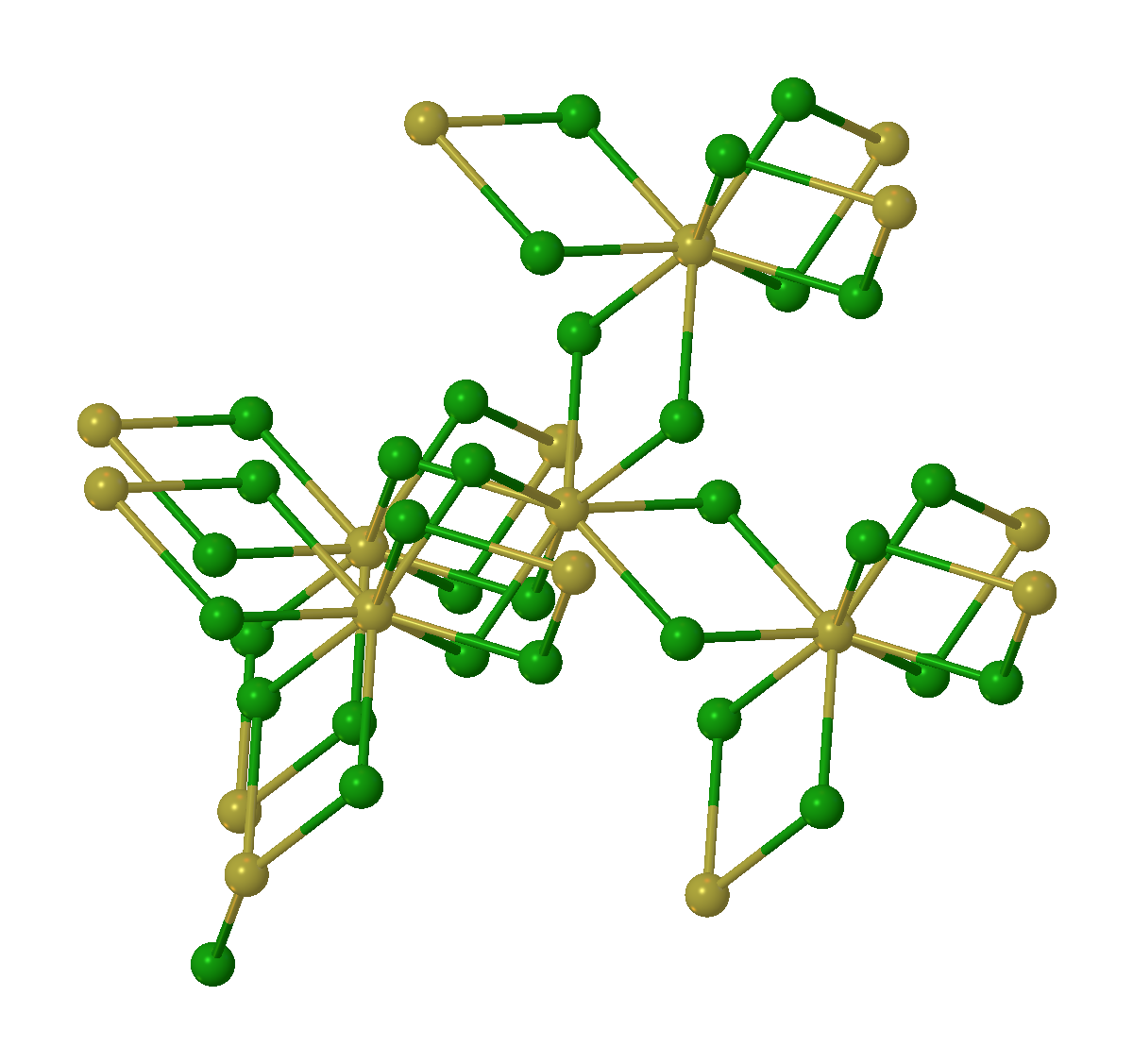

Names
- IUPAC name Neptunium(IV) fluoride
- Other names Neptunium tetrafluoride

Identifiers
| CAS Number | 14529-88-5 |
| 3D model (JSmol) | Interactive image |
| PubChem CID | 165358598 |
| CompTox Dashboard (EPA) | DTXSID901300818 |
- InChI: InChI=1S/4FH.Np/h4*1H;/q;;;;+4/p-4 Key: SOLQLNAXKAQIPH-UHFFFAOYSA-J
- SMILES: F[Np](F)(F)F

Properties
| Chemical formula | NpF_{4} |
| Molar mass | 313 g/mol |
| Appearance | Green solid |

Structure
| Crystal structure | Monoclinic, mS60 |
| Space group | C2/c, No. 15 |
| Lattice constant | a = 1.27 nm, b = 1.0082 nm, c = 0.833 nm α = 90°, β = 126.03°, γ = 90° |
| Lattice volume (V) | 0.86256 nm^{3} |
| Formula units (Z) | 12 |

Thermochemistry
| Heat capacity (C) | 116 ± 4 J/mol·K |
| Std molar entropy (S^{⦵}_{298}) | 148 ± 3 J/mol·K |
| Std enthalpy of formation (Δ_{f}H^{⦵}_{298}) | −1874 ± 16 kJ/mol |
| Gibbs free energy (Δ_{f}G^{⦵}) | −1783 ± 16 kJ/mol |
- Except where otherwise noted, data are given for materials in their standard state (at 25 °C [77 °F], 100 kPa). Infobox references

Neptunium(IV) fluoride or neptunium tetrafluoride is an inorganic compound with the formula NpF_{4}. It is a green salt and is isostructural with UF_{4}.

== Synthesis ==
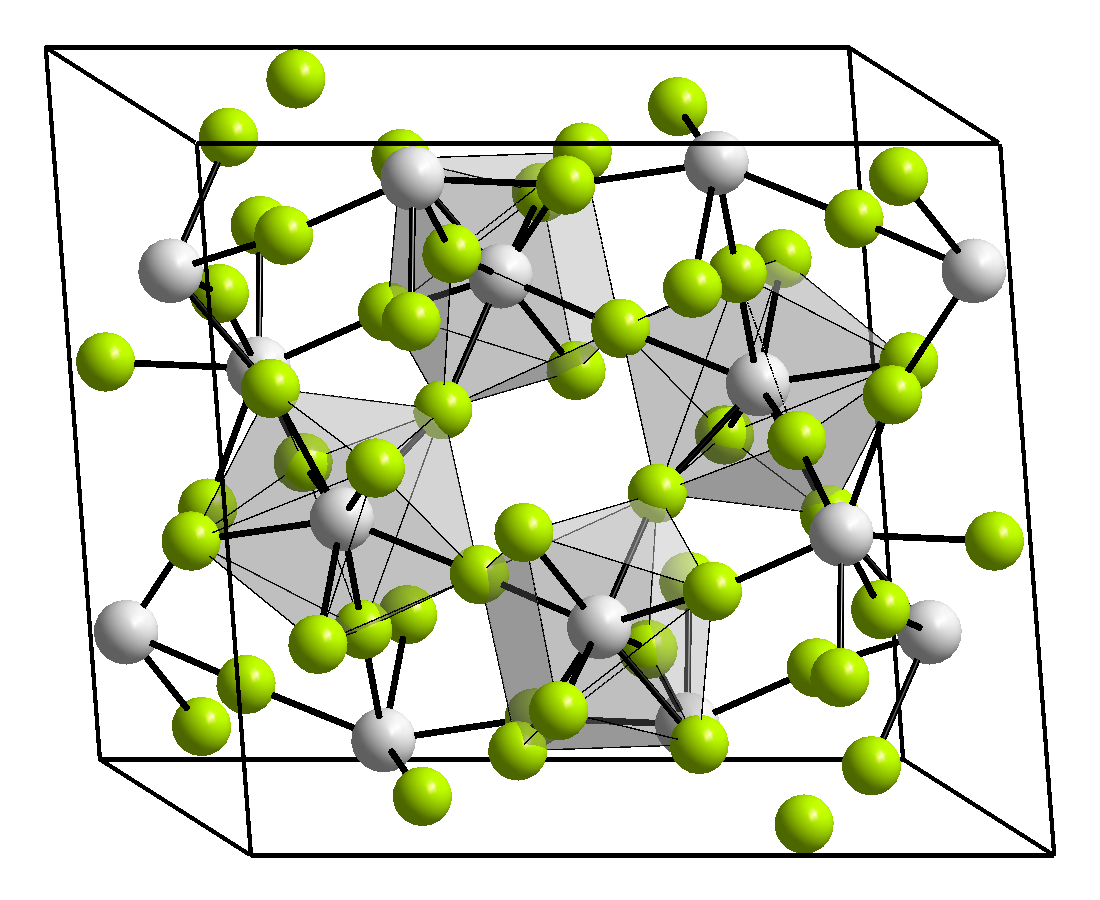
Alternative view of the structure of solid NpF_{4}.

Neptunium(IV) fluoride can be prepared by reacting neptunium(III) fluoride or neptunium dioxide with a gas mixture of oxygen and hydrogen fluoride at 500 °C:

4 NpF_{3} + O_{2} + 4 HF → 4 NpF_{4} + 2 H_{2}O

It can also be prepared by treating neptunium dioxide with HF gas:

NpO_{2} + 4 HF → NpF_{4} + 2 H_{2}O
