= Neptunium nitride =

Names
- Other names neptunium mononitride, azanylidyneneptunium, neptunium(III) nitride

Identifiers
CAS Number	12058-90-1
3D model (JSmol)	Interactive image
- InChI: InChI=1S/N.Np/q-3;+3 Key: CONMGCPYTMDXHG-UHFFFAOYSA-N
- SMILES: [Np]#N

Properties
Chemical formula	NNp
Molar mass	251 g·mol^{−1}
Appearance	black crystals
Density	14.18 g/cm^{3}
Melting point	2,557 °C (4,635 °F; 2,830 K)
Solubility in water	insoluble
- Except where otherwise noted, data are given for materials in their standard state (at 25 °C [77 °F], 100 kPa). Infobox references

Neptunium nitride is a binary inorganic compound of neptunium and nitrogen with the chemical formula NpN.

== Preparation ==
Neptunium nitride can be prepared by the reaction of freshly obtained neptunium hydride and ammonia:

NpH_{3} + NH_{3} → NpN + 3H_{2}

The reaction of neptunium and nitrogen can also obtain neptunium nitride:

2Np + N_{2} → 2NpN

== Physical properties ==
Neptunium nitride forms black crystals in the cubic system with Fm3m space group. It is insoluble in water and decomposes if heated.

2NpN → 2Np + N_{2}

== Uses ==
Neptunium nitride is used as a target material for plutonium-238 production.

^{237}_{93}Np + n → ^{238}_{93}Np
