= Neptunium(III) fluoride =

Names
- IUPAC name Neptunium(III) fluoride
- Other names Neptunium trifluoride

Identifiers
CAS Number	16852-37-2
3D model (JSmol)	Interactive image
ChemSpider	103872710
PubChem CID	13751216
CompTox Dashboard (EPA)	DTXSID701312245
- InChI: InChI=1S/Np.3FH/h;3*1H/q+3;;;/p-3 Key: ZBOLUSKWQLLYDC-UHFFFAOYSA-K
- SMILES: F[Np](F)F

Properties
Chemical formula	NpF_{3}
Molar mass	294 g/mol
Appearance	Purple solid

Structure
Crystal structure	Trigonal, hP8
Space group	P6_{3}/mmc, No. 194
Lattice constant	a = 0.7129 nm, c = 0.7288 nm
Lattice volume (V)	0.32077 nm^{3}
Formula units (Z)	6

Thermochemistry
Heat capacity (C)	94 ± 3 J/mol·K
Std molar entropy (S^{⦵}_{298})	131 ± 3 J/mol·K
Std enthalpy of formation (Δ_{f}H^{⦵}_{298})	−1529 ± 8 kJ/mol
Gibbs free energy (Δ_{f}G^{⦵})	−1461 ± 8 kJ/mol

Related compounds
Other anions	Neptunium(III) chloride
- Except where otherwise noted, data are given for materials in their standard state (at 25 °C [77 °F], 100 kPa). Infobox references

Neptunium(III) fluoride or neptunium trifluoride is a salt of neptunium and fluorine with the formula NpF_{3}.

== Synthesis ==
Neptunium(III) fluoride can be prepared by reacting neptunium dioxide with a gas mixture of hydrogen and hydrogen fluoride at 500 °C:

2 NpO_{2} + H_{2} + 6 HF → 2 NpF_{3} + 4 H_{2}O
