= Sultine =

Structure of a benzosultine.

In chemistry, a sultine is a cyclic ester of a sulfinic acid. This class of organosulfur compounds has few applications. These compounds are typically prepared by the dehydration of hydroxy-sulfinic acids or their equivalent. Illustrative of an alternative route, xylylene dibromide reacts with sodium sulfoxylate (source of SO_{2}^{2-}) to give the sultine C_{6}H_{4}(CH_{2}S(O)OCH_{2}), which is a precursor to o-quinodimethane.
