= Sulfinic acid =

Class of chemical compounds

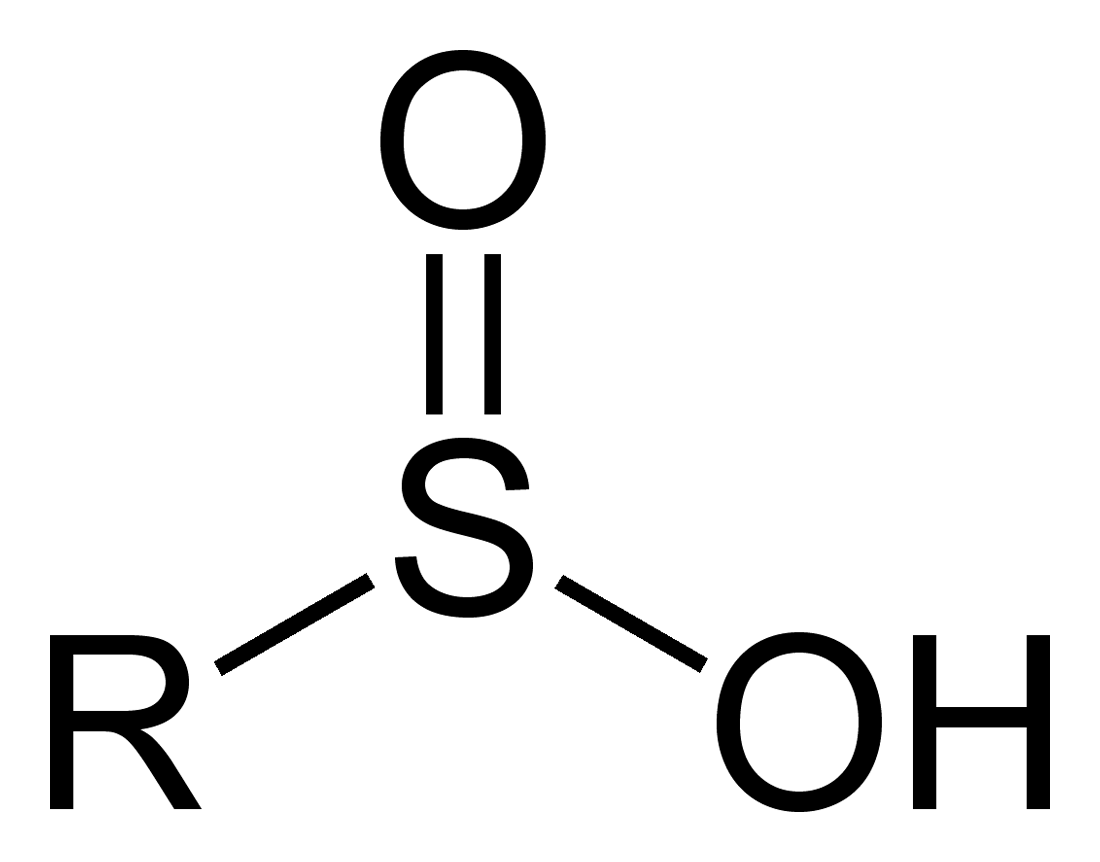
The general structure of a sulfinic acid

Sulfinic acids are oxoacids of sulfur with the structure RSO(OH). In these organosulfur compounds, sulfur is pyramidal.

== Structure and properties ==
Sulfinic acids RSO_{2}H are typically more acidic than the corresponding carboxylic acid RCO_{2}H. The conjugate base is a sulfinate. Although sulfur is pyramidal, sulfinic acids are achiral due to chemical exchange of the proton between the two oxygen atoms. The free acids are typically unstable, disproportionating to the sulfonic acid RSO_{3}H and thiosulfonate RSSO_{2}R. The formal anhydride of a sulfinic acid has no oxygen atom bridge, but is instead a sulfinyl sulfone (R–S^{+}(–O^{−})–S^{2+}(–O^{−})_{2}–R′), and disproportionation is believed to occur through the free-radical fission of this intermediate.

Alkylation of sulfinic acids can give either sulfones or sulfinate esters, depending on the solvent and reagent. Strongly polarized reactants (e.g. trimethyloxonium tetrafluoroborate) give esters, whereas relatively unpolarized reactants (e.g. an alkyl halide or enone) give sulfones. Sulfinates react with Grignard reagents to give sulfoxides, and undergo a variant of the Claisen condensation towards the same end.

Cobalt(III) salts can oxidize sulfinic acids to disulfones, although yields are only 30–50%.

Some mercury arylsulfinates decompose to sulfur dioxide and the corresponding arylmercury compound.

== Preparation ==
Sulfinic acids are often prepared in situ by acidification of the corresponding sulfinate salts, which are typically more robust than the acid. These salts are generated by reduction of sulfonyl chlorides with metals, although thiolates also reduce thiosulfonates to a sulfinate and a disulfide.

An alternative route is the reaction of Grignard reagents with sulfur dioxide. Transition metal sulfinates are also generated by insertion of sulfur dioxide into metal alkyls, a reaction that may proceed via a metal sulfur dioxide complex.

Sulfones may eliminate in base, particularly if a strong nucleophile is present; thus for example sodium cyanide causes bis(2‑butanone-4‑yl) sulfone to split into levulinonitrile and 3‑oxobutane 1‑sulfinic acid:

SO_{2}((CH_{2})_{2}Ac)_{2} + NaCN → NaSO_{2}(CH_{2})_{2}Ac + NC(CH_{2})_{2}Ac

The nitrile presumably forms through conjugate addition of cyanide to the corresponding enone.

Friedel-Crafts addition of thionyl chloride to an alkene gives an α‑chloro sulfinyl chloride, typically complexed to a Lewis acid. Likewise a carbanion can attack thionyl chloride to give a sulfinyl chloride. Careful hydrolysis then gives a sulfinic acid. Sulfinyl chlorides attack sulfinates to give sulfinyl sulfones (sulfinic anhydrides).

Unsubstituted sulfinic acid, when R is the hydrogen atom, is a higher energy isomer of sulfoxylic acid, both of which are unstable.

== Examples ==
Sulfinic Acids and Derivatives
thiourea dioxide, a reducing agent used in textiles

hypotaurine, a biosynthetic intermediate

Rongalite, a source of "SO_{2}^{2−}"

An example of a simple, well-studied sulfinic acid is phenylsulfinic acid. A commercially important sulfinic acid is thiourea dioxide, which is prepared by the oxidation of thiourea with hydrogen peroxide.

(NH_{2})_{2}CS + 2H_{2}O_{2} → (NH)(NH_{2})CSO_{2}H + 2H_{2}O

Another commercially important sulfinic acid is hydroxymethyl sulfinic acid, which is usually employed as its sodium salt (HOCH_{2}SO_{2}Na). Called Rongalite, this anion is also commercially useful as a reducing agent.

The enzyme cysteine dioxygenase converts cysteine into the corresponding sulfinate. One product of this catabolic reaction is the sulfinic acid hypotaurine.

Cyclic sulfinate esters are called sultines.

== See also ==
- Sulfonic acid
- Carboxylic acid
- Sulfurous acid
