= 4-Amino-3-hydrazino-5-mercapto-1,2,4-triazole =

Names
- Preferred IUPAC name 4-Amino-5-hydrazinyl-2,4-dihydro-3H-1,2,4-triazole-3-thione
- Other names Purpald; AHMT; 1,2,4-Triazolidin-3-one, 4-amino-5-thioxo-, hydrazone (9CI); 4H-1,2,4-Triazole-3-thiol, 4-amino-5-hydrazino- (6CI,7CI)

Identifiers
CAS Number	1750-12-5
3D model (JSmol)	Interactive image
ChemSpider	2006123
ECHA InfoCard	100.015.578
PubChem CID	2723946
UNII	L49PBF7WZF
CompTox Dashboard (EPA)	DTXSID1061944
- InChI: InChI=1S/C2H6N6S/c3-5-1-6-7-2(9)8(1)4/h3-4H2,(H,5,6)(H,7,9) Key: RDIMQHBOTMWMJA-UHFFFAOYSA-N
- SMILES: c1(=S)[nH]nc(n1N)NN

Properties
Chemical formula	C_{2}H_{6}N_{6}S
Molar mass	146.17
Appearance	white solid
Density	1.69 g/cm^{3}
Melting point	228 °C (442 °F; 501 K)
- Except where otherwise noted, data are given for materials in their standard state (at 25 °C [77 °F], 100 kPa). Infobox references

4-Amino-3-hydrazino-5-mercapto-1,2,4-triazole is an organic compound with the formula SC_{2}N_{3}H(NH_{2})(N_{2}H_{3}). The compound consists of a 1,2,4-triazole heterocycle with three functional groups: amine, thioamide and hydrazyl. X-ray crystallography shows that this molecule is polar but with a C=S double bond. It is prepared by the reaction of hydrazine with thiourea:

2 SC(NH_{2})_{2} + 3 N_{2}H_{4} → SC_{2}N_{3}H(NH_{2})(N_{2}H_{3}) + 4 NH_{3} + H_{2}S

The compound has been used as a reagent for the colorimetric detection of aldehydes.
