= Thiourea =

Organosulfur compound (S=C(NH2)2)

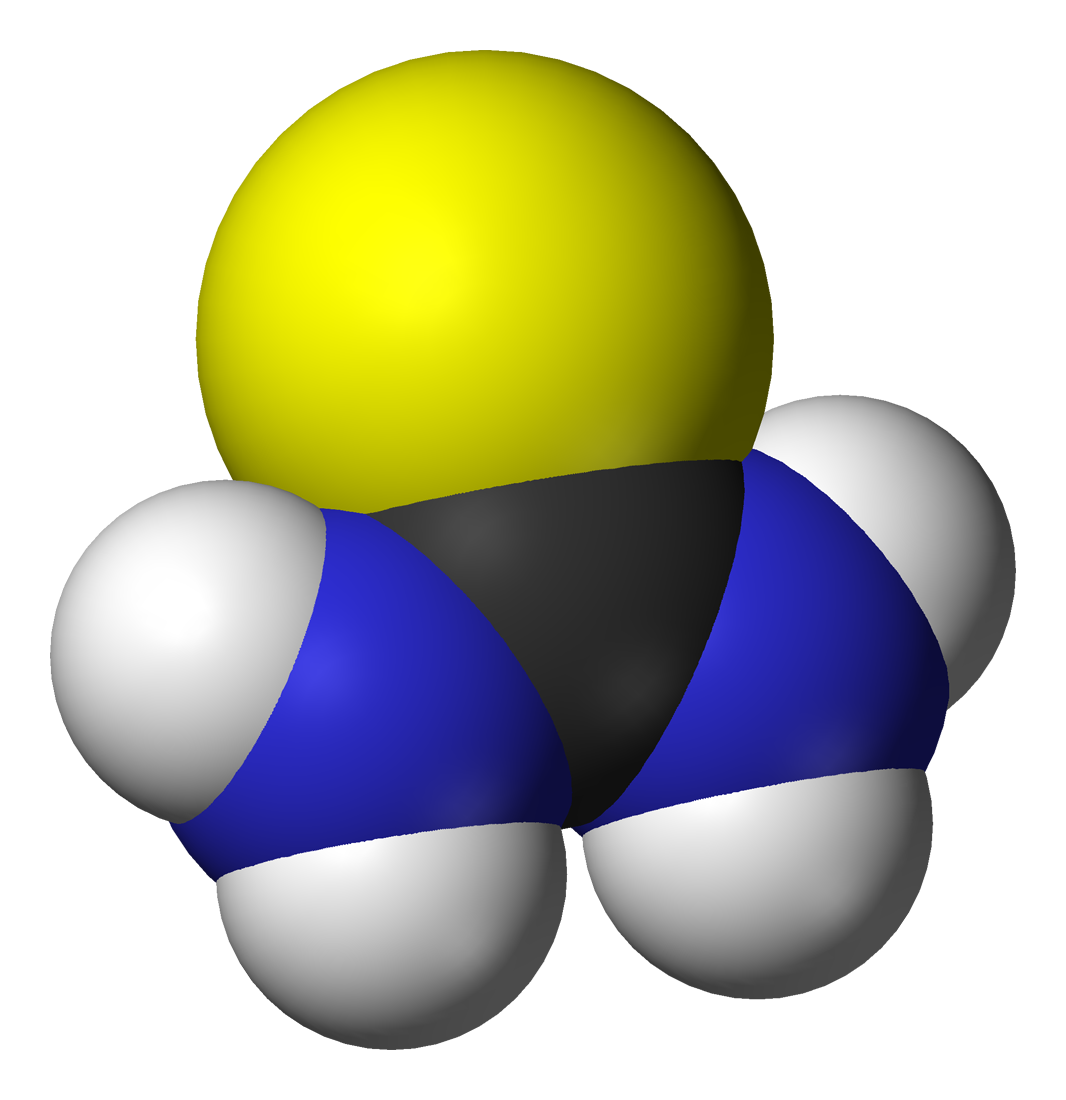
- Carbon, C Hydrogen, H Nitrogen, N Sulfur, S

Names
- Preferred IUPAC name Thiourea
- Other names Thiocarbamide

Identifiers
CAS Number	62-56-6
3D model (JSmol)	Interactive image
Beilstein Reference	605327
ChEBI	CHEBI:36946
ChEMBL	ChEMBL260876
ChemSpider	2005981
ECHA InfoCard	100.000.494
Gmelin Reference	1604
KEGG	C14415
PubChem CID	2723790
RTECS number	YU2800000
UNII	GYV9AM2QAG
UN number	2811
CompTox Dashboard (EPA)	DTXSID9021348
- InChI: InChI=1S/CH4N2S/c2-1(3)4/h(H4,2,3,4) Key: UMGDCJDMYOKAJW-UHFFFAOYSA-N; InChI=1/CH4N2S/c2-1(3)4/h(H4,2,3,4) Key: UMGDCJDMYOKAJW-UHFFFAOYAJ
- SMILES: C(=S)(N)N

Properties
Chemical formula	SC(NH_{2})_{2}
Molar mass	76.12 g·mol^{−1}
Appearance	white solid
Density	1.405 g/mL
Melting point	182 °C (360 °F; 455 K)
Solubility in water	142 g/L (25 °C)
Magnetic susceptibility (χ)	−4.24×10^{−5} cm^{3}/mol

Hazards
- GHS labelling
Pictograms	(GHS07: Exclamation mark) (GHS08: Health hazard) (GHS09: Environmental hazard)
Signal word	Warning
Hazard statements	H302, H351, H361, H411
Precautionary statements	P201, P202, P264, P270, P273, P281, P301+P312, P308+P313, P330, P391, P405, P501
NFPA 704 (fire diamond)	3 1 0

Related compounds
Related compounds	Urea; Selenourea
- Except where otherwise noted, data are given for materials in their standard state (at 25 °C [77 °F], 100 kPa). verify (what is ?) Infobox references

Thiourea (/ˌθaɪ.oʊjʊəˈriː.ə, -ˈjʊəri-/) is an organosulfur compound with the formula SC(NH_{2})_{2} and the structure H_{2}N−C(=S)−NH_{2}. It is structurally similar to urea (H_{2}N−C(=O)−NH_{2}), with the oxygen atom replaced by sulfur atom (as implied by the thio- prefix). The properties of urea and thiourea differ significantly. Thiourea is a reagent in organic synthesis. Thioureas are a broad class of compounds with the formula SC(NHR)(NH_{2}), SC(NHR)_{2}, etc

== Structure and bonding ==
Thiourea is a planar molecule. The C=S bond distance is 1.71 Å. The C-N distances average 1.33 Å. The weakening of the C-S bond by C-N pi-bonding is indicated by the short C=S bond in thiobenzophenone, which is 1.63 Å.

Thiourea occurs in two tautomeric forms, of which the thione form predominates in aqueous solutions. The equilibrium constant has been calculated as K_{eq} is 1.04×10^{−3}. The thiol form, which is also known as an isothiourea, can be encountered in substituted compounds such as isothiouronium salts.

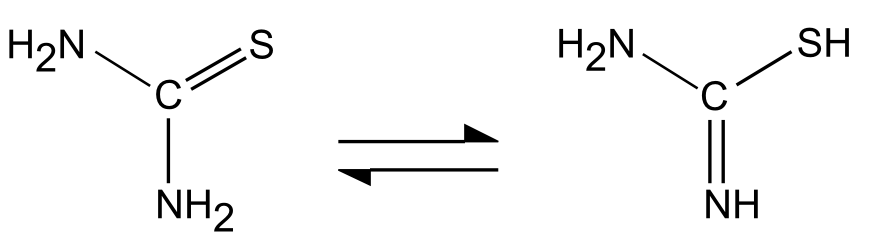

== Production ==
The global annual production of thiourea is around 8,000 tonnes, mostly in China. Thiourea is manufactured by the reaction of hydrogen sulfide with calcium cyanamide in the presence of carbon dioxide.

CaCN_{2} + 3 H_{2}S → Ca(SH)_{2} + (NH_{2})_{2}CS
2 CaCN_{2} + Ca(SH)_{2} + 6 H_{2}O → 2 (NH_{2})_{2}CS + 3 Ca(OH)_{2}
Ca(OH)_{2} + CO_{2} → CaCO_{3} + H_{2}O

== Applications ==
=== Thiox precursor ===
Thiourea is a precursor to thiourea dioxide, which is achieved using hydrogen peroxide:

(NH_{2})_{2}CS + 2 H_{2}O_{2} → (NH)(NH_{2})CSO_{2}H + 2 H_{2}O

Thiourea dioxide is a common reducing agent in textile processing.

=== Pharmaceuticals ===
Thiourea has utility in practical heterocyclic chemistry. It is a precursor to sulfathiazoles, tetramisole, and cephalosporins.

=== Other uses ===
Other industrial uses of thiourea include production of flame retardant resins, and vulcanization accelerators. Thiourea is building blocks to pyrimidine derivatives. Thus, thioureas condense with β-dicarbonyl compounds. The amino group on the thiourea initially condenses with a carbonyl, followed by cyclization and tautomerization. Desulfurization delivers the pyrimidine. The pharmaceuticals thiobarbituric acid and sulfathiazole are prepared using thiourea. 4-Amino-3-hydrazino-5-mercapto-1,2,4-triazole is prepared by the reaction of thiourea and hydrazine.

Thiourea is used as an auxiliary agent in diazo paper, light-sensitive photocopy paper and almost all other types of copy paper.

It is also used to tone silver-gelatin photographic prints (see Sepia Toning).

Thiourea is used in the Clifton-Phillips and Beaver bright and semi-bright electroplating processes. It is also used in a solution with tin(II) chloride as an electroless tin plating solution for copper printed circuit boards.

Thiourea has been proposed as a fertilizer especially under conditions of environmental stress.

It is an ingredient in some metal polishes, such as Tarn-X, in combination with sulfamic acid and other ingredients to chemically remove tarnish from precious metals like silver, gold, and platinum.

== Reactions ==
Thiourea exists in dynamic equilibrium with ammonium thiocyanate at 150 °C. This equilibrium was once exploited as a route to thiourea, but the separation of the mixture is problematic. Thiourea is basic, sustaining protonation at sulfur. According to X-ray crystallography, the product is [HSC(NH_{2})_{2}]^{+}, a planar cation. Protonation does not substantially perturb the bond distances.

=== Oxidation ===
When treated with a variety of oxidants, thiourea forms a cationic disulfide. Oxidation with iodine proceeds as follows:

S=C(NH_{2})_{2} + I_{2} → [(H_{2}N)_{2}C−S−S−C(NH_{2})_{2}]^{2+} + 2 I^{−}

Oxidized with hydrogen peroxide gives thiourea dioxide.

=== Reductant ===
Thiourea reduces peroxides to the corresponding diols.

Thiourea is also used in the reductive workup of ozonolysis to give carbonyl compounds. Dimethyl sulfide is also an effective reagent for this reaction, but it is highly volatile (boiling point 37 °C) and has an obnoxious odor whereas thiourea is odorless and conveniently non-volatile (reflecting its polarity).

=== Precursor to thiols ===
Thiourea is employed as a source of sulfide, such as for converting alkyl halides to thiols. The reaction capitalizes on the nucleophilicity of the sulfur center and is reminiscent of the protonation of thiourea. S-alkylation gives a isothiouronium salt:

CS(NH_{2})_{2} + RX → RSC(NH_{2})^{+}_{2}X^{−}

Isothiouronium cations are prone to base hydrolysis to give the thiolate, which can undergo protonation to give the thiol.

RSC(NH_{2})^{+}_{2}X^{−} + 2 NaOH → RSNa + OC(NH_{2})_{2} + NaX + H_{2}O
RSNa + HCl → RSH + NaCl

In one example, ethane-1,2-dithiol is prepared from 1,2-dibromoethane:

C_{2}H_{4}Br_{2} + 2 SC(NH_{2})_{2} → [C_{2}H_{4}(SC(NH_{2})_{2})_{2}]Br_{2}
[C_{2}H_{4}(SC(NH_{2})_{2})_{2}]Br_{2} + 2 KOH → C_{2}H_{4}(SH)_{2} + 2 OC(NH_{2})_{2} + 2 KBr

=== Precursor to metal sulfides ===
Like other thioamides, thiourea can serve as a source of sulfide upon reaction with metal ions. For example, mercury sulfide forms when mercuric salts in aqueous solution are treated with thiourea:

Hg^{2+} + SC(NH_{2})_{2} + H_{2}O → HgS + OC(NH_{2})_{2} + 2 H^{+}

These sulfiding reactions have been applied to the synthesis of many metal sulfides..

=== Precursor to heterocycles ===
Thiourea is a building block for many heterocycles. It is a precursor to pyrimidine derivatives via condensation with β-dicarbonyl compounds.

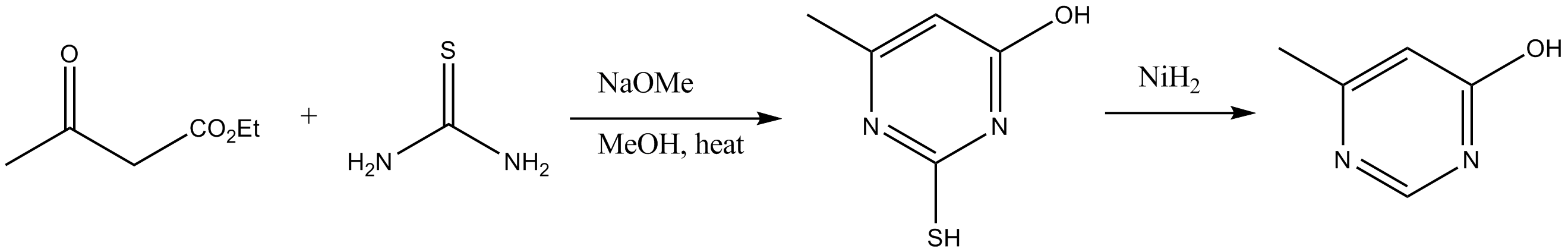

Similarly, aminothiazoles can be synthesized by the reaction of α-haloketones and thiourea.

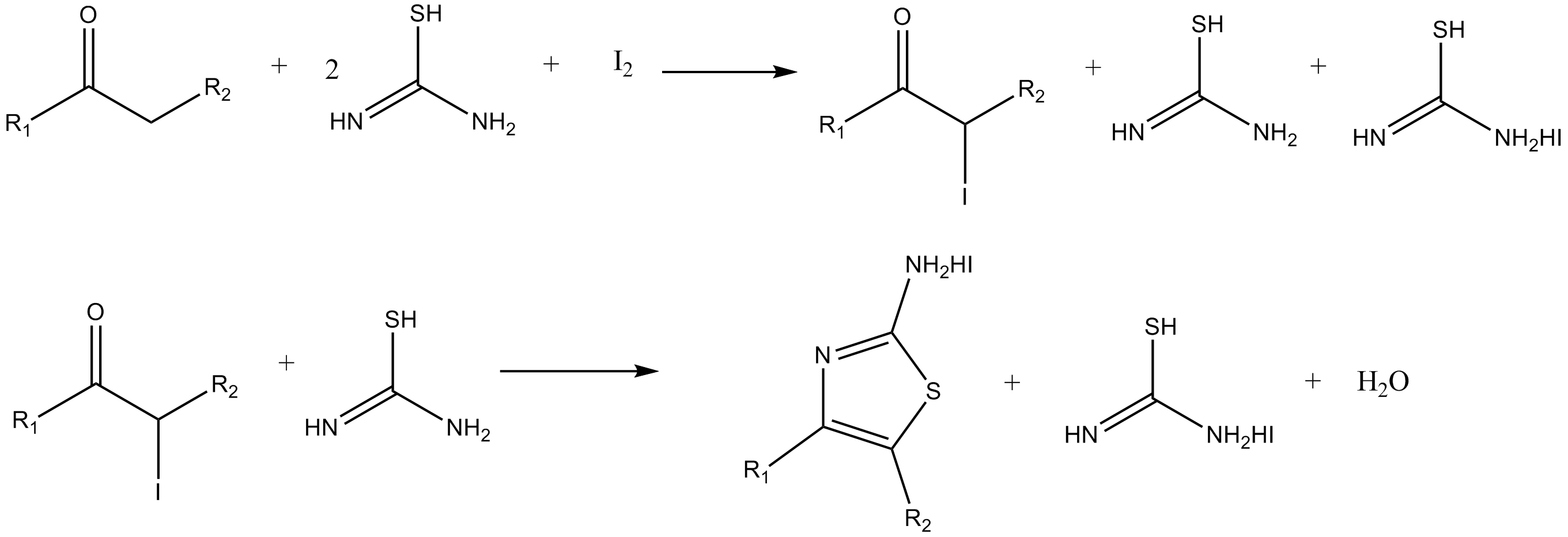

The pharmaceuticals thiobarbituric acid and sulfathiazole are prepared using thiourea. 4-Amino-3-hydrazino-5-mercapto-1,2,4-triazole is prepared by the reaction of thiourea and hydrazine.

=== With metals ===
Being a soft nucleophile, thiourea has an affinity for metal ions, forming coordination complexes. One practical consequence of its affinity for metals, thiourea is used as a silver polish. Another potential application is the use of thiourea as a lixiviant for gold and silver leaching, bypassing the steps of cyanide use and smelting.

Thiourea is a reagent in the Kurnakov test used to differentiate cis- and trans- isomers of certain square planar platinum complexes. The reaction was discovered in 1893 by Russian chemist Nikolai Kurnakov and is still performed as an assay for compounds of this type.

== Safety ==
The LD_{50} for thiourea is 125 mg/kg for rats (oral).

A goitrogenic effect (enlargement of the thyroid gland) has been reported for chronic exposure, reflecting the ability of thiourea to interfere with iodide uptake.

"Thiourea and its metabolites (probably oxidized thiourea) are tumorigenic and cause lung edema."

== See also ==
- Thioureas
