= Kurnakov test =

Chemical test

The Kurnakov test, also known as Kurnakov's reaction, is a chemical test that distinguishes pairs of cis- and trans-isomers of [PtA_{2}X_{2}] (A = NH_{3}, X = halogen or pseudohalide). Upon treatment with thiourea, the trans-dihalides give less soluble white products, whereas the cis-dihalides give more soluble yellow products. The test is still used to assay samples of the drug cisplatin, but it is mainly of pedagogical interest, as it illustrates the trans effect.

The test was devised by Soviet chemist Nikolai Kurnakov.

== Application ==
The Kurnakov test is sometimes used to detect transplatin in samples of the drug cisplatin. In hot aqueous solution, the cis-compound reacts with aqueous thiourea (tu) to give a deeper yellow solution, from which yellow needles of [Pt(tu)_{4}]Cl_{2} chloride deposit on cooling. The trans-compound gives a colourless solution, from which snow-white needles of trans-[Pt(tu)_{2}(NH_{3})_{2}]Cl_{2} deposit on cooling.
