= Thiourea dioxide =

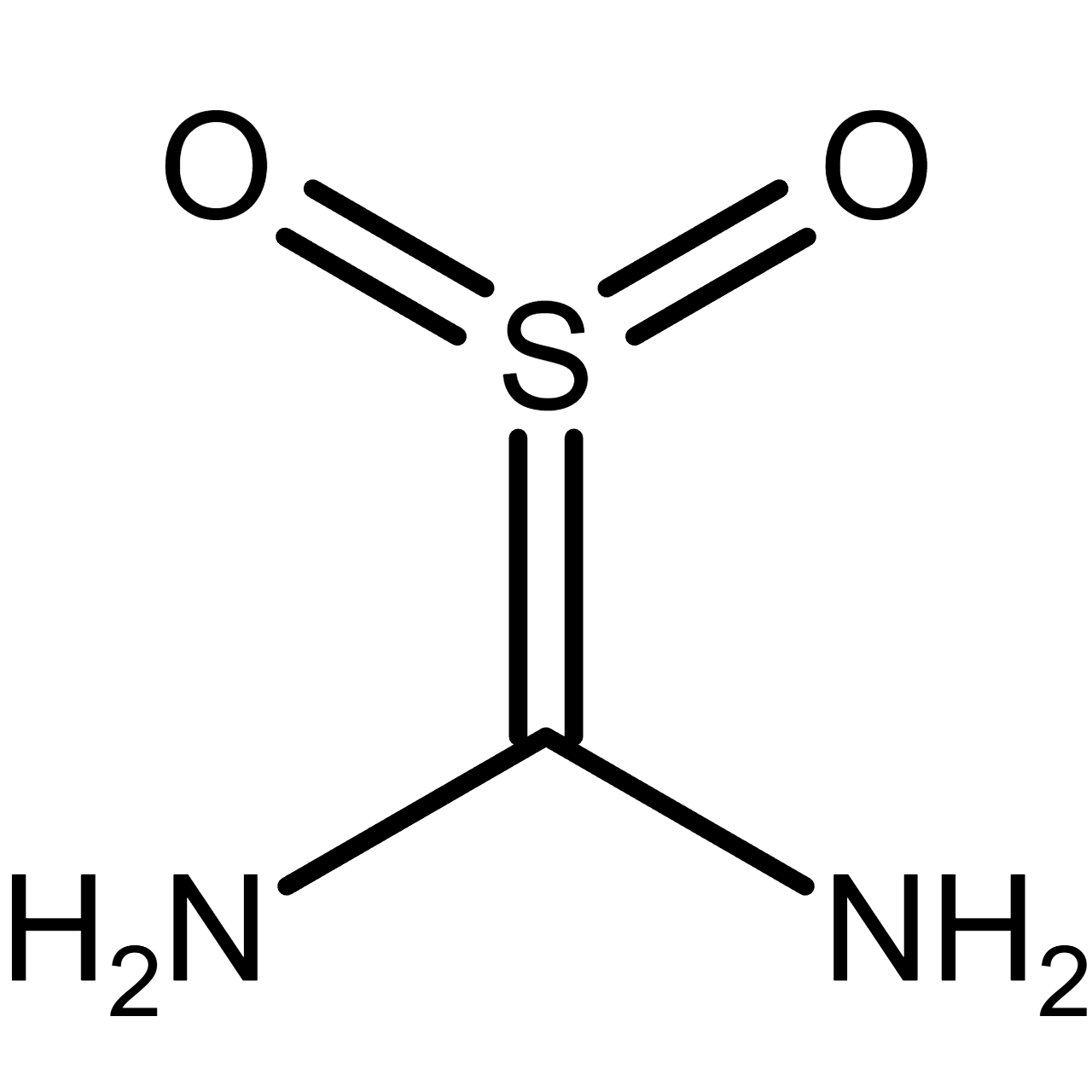

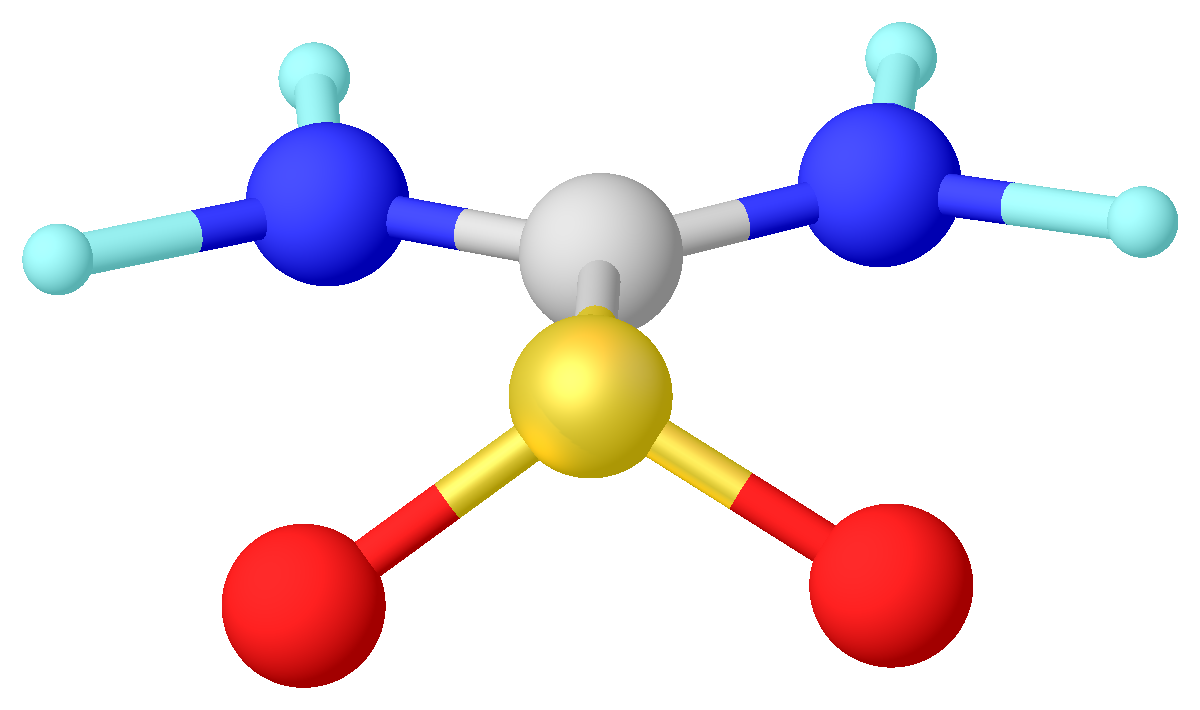

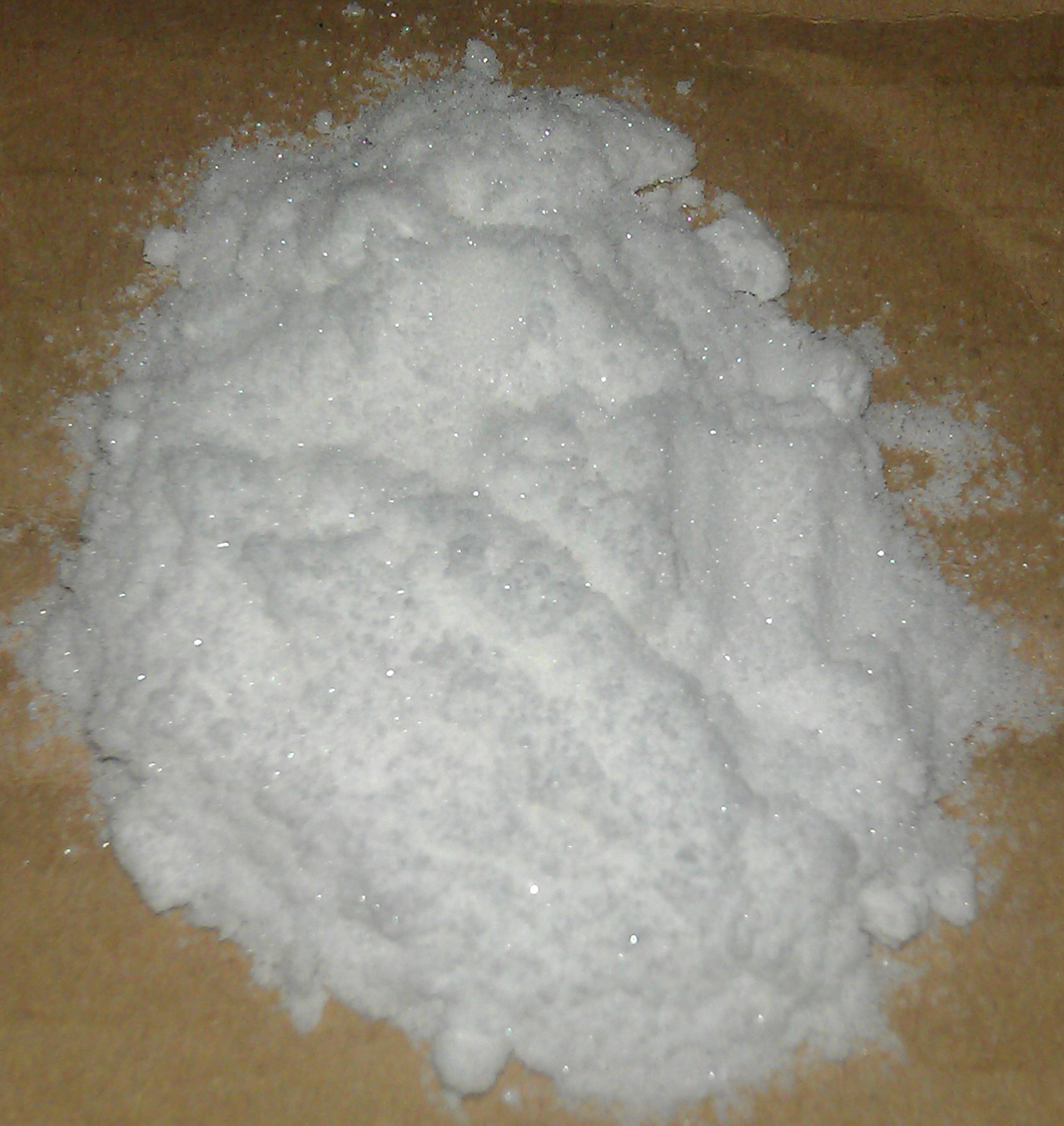

Names
- Preferred IUPAC name Amino(imino)methanesulfinic acid
- Other names Thiourea dioxide, DegaFAS, Reducing Agent F, Depilor, Formamidine Sulfinic Acid

Identifiers
CAS Number	1758-73-2
3D model (JSmol)	Interactive image
ChemSpider	55213
ECHA InfoCard	100.015.598
PubChem CID	61274
UNII	42BWR07L73
CompTox Dashboard (EPA)	DTXSID4029224
- InChI: InChI=1S/CH4N2O2S/c2-1(3)6(4)5/h(H3,2,3)(H,4,5) Key: FYOWZTWVYZOZSI-UHFFFAOYSA-N
- SMILES: C(=N)(N)S(=O)O

Properties
Chemical formula	CH_{4}N_{2}O_{2}S
Molar mass	108.12 g·mol^{−1}
Appearance	White powder
Melting point	126 °C (259 °F; 399 K)
Solubility in water	3.0 g/100 mL

Hazards
- GHS labelling
Pictograms	(GHS02: Flammable) (GHS05: Corrosive) (GHS07: Exclamation mark) (GHS08: Health hazard)
Signal word	Danger
Hazard statements	H252, H302, H315, H318, H332, H335, H373
Precautionary statements	P235+P410, P270, P280, P305+P351+P338, P310, P407, P501
- Except where otherwise noted, data are given for materials in their standard state (at 25 °C [77 °F], 100 kPa). (what is ?) Infobox references

Thiourea dioxide or thiox is an organosulfur compound that is used in the textile industry. It functions as a reducing agent. It is a white solid, and exhibits tautomerism in solution.

== Structure ==
Crystalline and gaseous thiourea dioxide adopts a C_{2v}-symmetric structure. Selected bond lengths: S-C = 186, C-N = 130, and S-O = 149 pm. The sulfur center is pyramidal. The C-S bond length is close to that of a single bond. For comparison, the C=S bond in thiourea is 171 pm. Instead the bonding is described with a significant contribution from a dipolar resonance structure with multiple bonding between C and N. One consequence of this bonding is the planarity of the nitrogen centers. In the presence of water or DMSO, thiourea dioxide converts to the tautomer, a sulfinic acid, (H_{2}N−)(HN=)C−S(=O)(−OH), named formamidine sulfinic acid.

Structure of the sulfinic acid tautomer of thiourea dioxide, as exists in aqueous solution

== Synthesis ==
Thiourea dioxide was first prepared in 1910 by the English chemist Edward de Barry Barnett, through a method not dissimilar from the modern synthesis.

Thiourea dioxide is prepared by the oxidation of thiourea with hydrogen peroxide, while maintaining a pH between 3 and 5 and temperature below 10 °C:

(NH_{2})_{2}CS + 2 H_{2}O_{2} → (NH)(NH_{2})CSO_{2}H + 2 H_{2}O

It can also be prepared by oxidation with chlorine dioxide. The quality of the product can be assessed by titration with indigo.

== Properties ==
Below pH 6.5, thiourea dioxide hydrolyzes to sulfoxylic acid and urea. Further oxidation with a peracid gives the corresponding sulfonic acid.

== Uses ==
Thiourea dioxide is used in reductive bleaching in textiles. Thiourea dioxide has also been used for the reduction of aromatic nitroaldehydes and nitroketones to nitroalcohols.
