= Nikolai Kurnakov =

Russian chemist

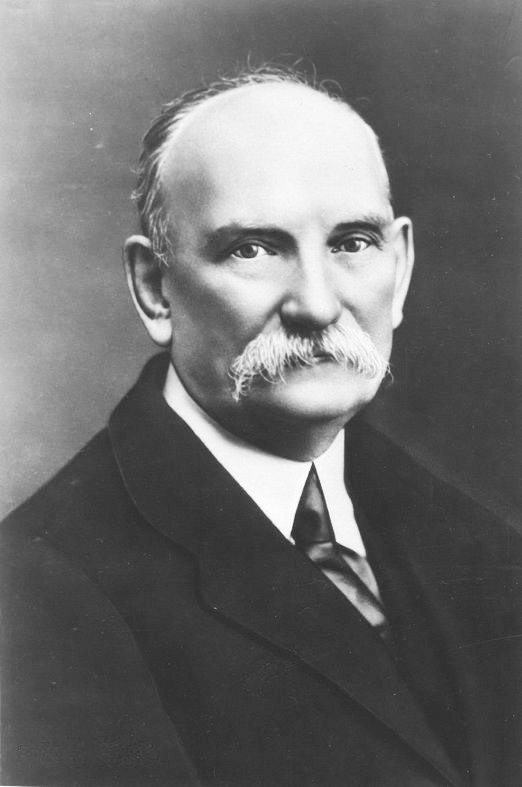
- Kurnakov in 1913
- Born: Nikolai Semyonovich Kurnakov; December 6, 1860; Nolinsk, Vyatka Governorate, Russian Empire
- Died: March 19, 1941 (aged 80); Barvikha, Soviet Union
- Known for: Kurnakov test
- Scientific career
- Fields: Chemist

Nikolai Semyonovich Kurnakov (Russian: Николай Семёнович Курнаков; 6 December [O.S. 24 November] 1860 – 19 March 1941) was a Russian chemist, who is internationally recognized as the originator of physicochemical analysis. He also was one of the principal founders of the platinum industry in the Soviet Union. A chemical reaction that he pioneered, known as the Kurnakov test, is still used to differentiate cis from trans isomers of divalent platinum and is his best-known contribution to coordination chemistry.

== Early life and career ==
Kurnakov was born in Nolinsk, Vyatka Governorate. He attended a high school at Nizhny Novgorod and later studied at the Mining Institute in St. Petersburg. Distantly related to organic chemist Vladimir Markovnikov, he made an early choice of a chemistry career, setting up a home laboratory at 14. He published his first article on alum crystallization and sodium thioantimoniate in 1882. In the same year he graduated as a mining engineer.

During a trip to France, Germany and Austria, Kurnakov studied salt manufacturing in several locations. The scientific work of this trip became his Ph.D. thesis, which he completed in 1884.

== Career ==
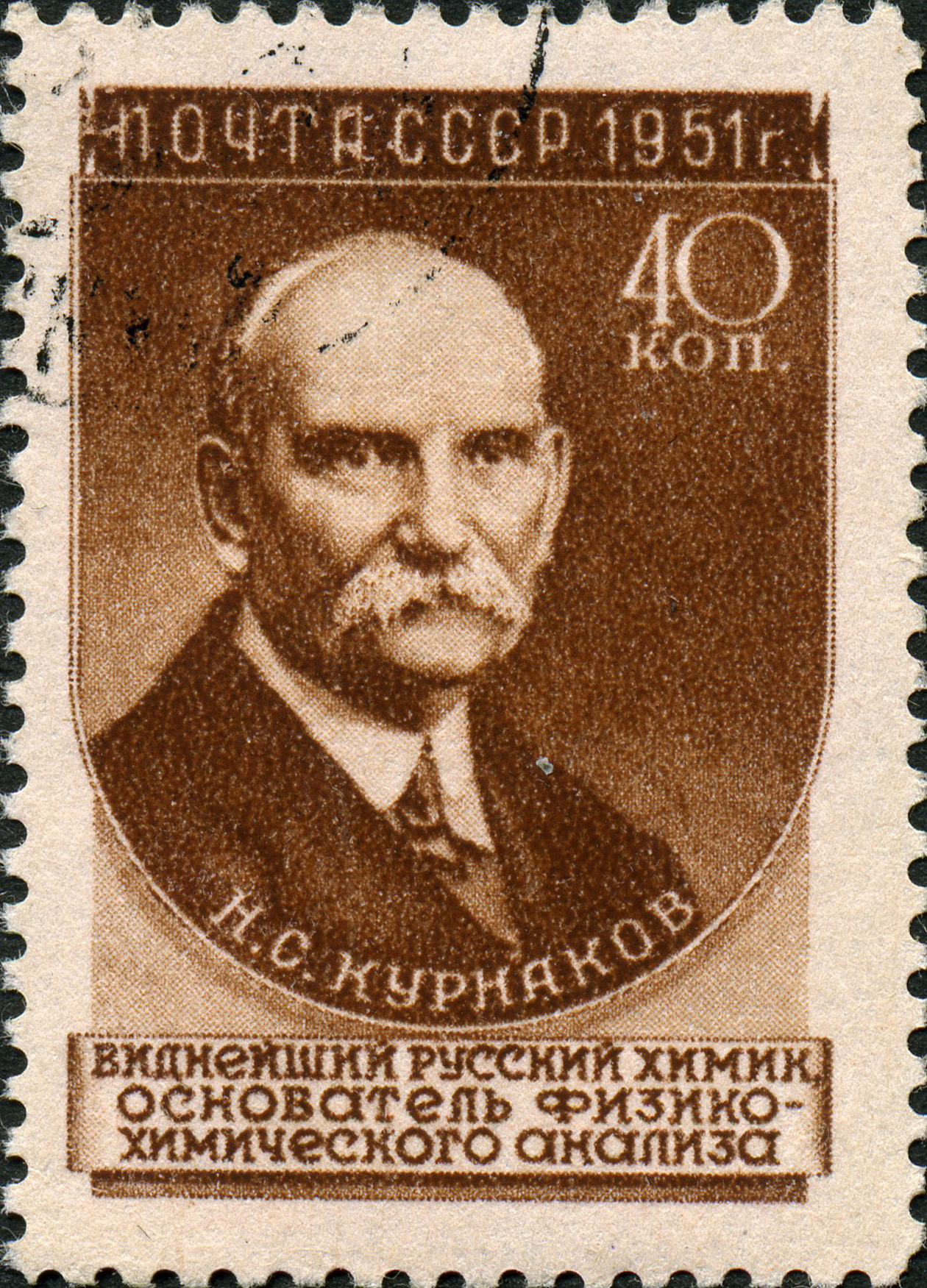
Kurnakov on a 1951 Soviet stamp

He then worked for several years at the Mining Institute, mostly on the formation of salts and potash deposits and mining and beneficiation of salt and potash. In 1893, Kurnakov became professor of inorganic chemistry for his work on the reactions of cis- and trans- platinum complexes with thiourea, today known as the Kurnakov test. In 1902 he became professor at the Saint Petersburg Polytechnic Institute, which he established together with Dmitri Mendeleev and Nikolai Menshutkin. He held the position until 1930.

In his later years, he focused his work on platinum chemistry and platinum production. He received several prizes, for example, the Mendeleev Prize in 1936, the Order of the Red Banner of Labour in 1939 and the Stalin Prize in 1941. He was also awarded a Doctor honoris causa by Moscow State University in 1909. After the death of his wife in 1940 his health deteriorated, and he died in a sanatorium in Barvikha on 19 March 1941. A mineral was named kurnakovite in his honor.
