= Sequanium =

Proposed chemical element

Sequanium was the proposed name for a new element that Romanian physicist Horia Hulubei reported he had discovered in 1939. The name derived from the Latin word Sequana for the river Seine running through Paris where Hulubei worked at that time.

Hulubei thought he had discovered element 93 in a tantalite sample from the French region Haute-Vienne. Element 93 was synthesised in 1940 and named neptunium. It does in fact occur in nature in trace amounts, but it is not commonly believed that Hulubei actually discovered it.
