= Neptunium(VII) oxide-hydroxide =

Names
- Other names Neptunyl hydroxide

Identifiers
3D model (JSmol)	Interactive image
CompTox Dashboard (EPA)	DTXSID301337069
- InChI: InChI=1S/Np.3H2O.2O/h;3*1H2;;/q+3;;;;;/p-3 Key: QJJOKRDJFDRNCY-UHFFFAOYSA-K
- SMILES: [Np+3](=O)=O.[OH-].[OH-].[OH-]

Properties
Chemical formula	NpO_{2}(OH)_{3}
Molar mass	320.02 g/mol
Appearance	Black solid
Solubility in water	10 mg/l
Solubility	Soluble in nitric acid and 1 M potassium hydroxide
- Except where otherwise noted, data are given for materials in their standard state (at 25 °C [77 °F], 100 kPa). Infobox references

Neptunium(VII) oxide-hydroxide is a chemical compound which has neptunium in its highest oxidation state of +7. This compound reacts with basic salts such as potassium hydroxide to form neptunates (NpO_{5}^{3-}) and water.

NpO_{2}(OH)_{3} + 3KOH → K_{3}NpO_{5} + 3H_{2}O

Neptunium(VII) oxide-hydroxide is stable in an alkaline solution, however, it is slowly reduced to Np(VI) in an acidic solution. In water, it forms a greenish solution. This compound decomposes slowly to an oxidized solid.

== Production ==
Neptunium(VII) oxide-hydroxide is produced by the oxidation of Np(VI) in alkaline solution with ozone, then neutralized with nitric acid to precipitate out the neptunium(VII) oxide-hydroxide.
