= Rongalite =

- Rongalite

Names
- IUPAC name Sodium hydroxymethanesulfinate
- Other names Sodium formaldehydesulfoxylate, sodium oxymethylene sulfoxylate, Brüggolit

Identifiers
| CAS Number | 149-44-0; 6035-47-8 (dihydrate) |
| 3D model (JSmol) | Interactive image |
| ChEMBL | ChEMBL2107242 |
| ChemSpider | 8649 |
| ECHA InfoCard | 100.005.219 |
| EC Number | 205-739-4 |
| PubChem CID | 23689980 |
| RTECS number | PB0380000 |
| UNII | X4ZGP7K714; SQ4705447D (dihydrate) |
| CompTox Dashboard (EPA) | DTXSID7027120 |
- InChI: InChI=1S/CH4O3S.Na/c2-1-5(3)4;/h2H,1H2,(H,3,4);/q;+1/p-1 Key: XWGJFPHUCFXLBL-UHFFFAOYSA-M; InChI=1/CH4O3S.Na/c2-1-5(3)4;/h2H,1H2,(H,3,4);/q;+1/p-1 Key: XWGJFPHUCFXLBL-REWHXWOFAH
- SMILES: [Na+].[O-]S(=O)CO

Properties
| Chemical formula | CH_{3}NaO_{3}S |
| Molar mass | 118.10 g/mol 154.14 g/mol, dihydrate |
| Appearance | colorless crystals |
| Density | 1.75 g/cm^{3}, dihydrate |
| Melting point | 64.5 °C (148.1 °F; 337.6 K) dihydrate |
| Solubility in water | 600 g/L, dihydrate (approximate) |
| Acidity (pK_{a}) | decomposes at low pH |

Structure
| Molecular shape | pyramidal at S |

Hazards
- GHS labelling
| Pictograms | (GHS08: Health hazard) |
| Signal word | Warning |
| Hazard statements | H341 |
| Precautionary statements | P201, P202, P281, P308+P313, P405, P501 |

Related compounds
| Related compounds | SO_{3}^{2−}, CH_{2}O |
- Except where otherwise noted, data are given for materials in their standard state (at 25 °C [77 °F], 100 kPa). verify (what is ?) Infobox references

Rongalite is a chemical compound with the molecular formula Na^{+}HOCH_{2}SO_{2}^{−}. This salt has many additional names, including Rongalit, sodium hydroxymethylsulfinate, sodium formaldehyde sulfoxylate, and Bruggolite. It is listed in the European Cosmetics Directive as sodium oxymethylene sulfoxylate (INCI). It is water-soluble and generally sold as the dihydrate. The compound and its derivatives are widely used in the dye industry. The structure of this salt has been confirmed by X-ray crystallography.

== Synthesis and reactions ==
Although available commercially, the salt can be prepared from sodium dithionite and formaldehyde:

Na_{2}S_{2}O_{4} + 2 CH_{2}O + H_{2}O → HO-CH_{2}-SO_{3}Na + HO-CH_{2}-SO_{2}Na

This reaction proceeds quantitatively, such that dithionite can be determined by its conversion to Rongalite, which is far less O_{2}-sensitive and thus easier to handle.

The hydroxymethanesulfinate ion is unstable in solution towards decomposition to formaldehyde and sulfite. Addition of at least one equivalent of formaldehyde pushes the equilibrium towards the side of the adduct and reacts further to give the bis-(hydroxymethyl)sulfone. Such solutions are shelf-stable indefinitely.

Sodium hydroxymethanesulfinate was originally developed in the early 20th century for the textile industry as a shelf-stable source of sulfoxylate ion, where the latter can be generated at will. In use, when sodium hydroxymethanesulfinate is made acidic, the reducing sulfoxylate ion and formaldehyde are released in equimolar amounts. For safety reasons the generation of formaldehyde must be taken into consideration when used industrially.

NaHOCH_{2}SO_{2} can essentially be considered to be a source of SO_{2}^{2−}. As such it is used both as a reducing agent and as a reagent to introduce SO_{2} groups into organic molecules. Treatment of elemental Se and Te with NaHOCH_{2}SO_{2} gives solutions containing the corresponding Na_{2}Se_{x} and Na_{2}Te_{x}, where x is approximately 2. As a nucleophile, NaHOCH_{2}SO_{2} reacts with alkylating agents to give sulfones.

HO-CH_{2}-SO_{2}Na + 2 C_{6}H_{5}CH_{2}Br → [C_{6}H_{5}CH_{2}]_{2}SO_{2} + NaBr + CH_{2}O + HBr

Occasionally, alkylation will occur also at oxygen, thus xylylene dibromide gives both the sulfone and the isomeric sulfinate ester.

== Use ==
The original use of the compound was as industrial bleaching agent and as a reducing agent for vat dyeing. Another large-scale use is as a reducing agent in redox-initiator systems for emulsion polymerization. One of the typical redox pair examples is t-butyl peroxide. A niche use is its use as water conditioner for aquaria as it rapidly reduces chlorine and chloramine and reacts with ammonia to form the innocuous aminomethylsulfinate ion. It is also used as an antioxidant in pharmaceutical formulation.

The compound has been used increasingly in commercial cosmetic hair dye colour removers despite the generation of formaldehyde, a known human carcinogen.

It has a variety of specialized applications in organic synthesis.

== Related compounds ==
The zinc complex Zn(HOCH_{2}SO_{2})_{2} is marketed under the trademarks Decroline, Decolin, and Safolin. This compound is an additive in polymers and textiles.

Sodium hydroxymethanesulfinate is called Rongalite C. Calcium hydroxymethanesulfinate is called Rongalite H.
