= Organoactinide chemistry =

Study of chemical compounds containing actinide-carbon bonds

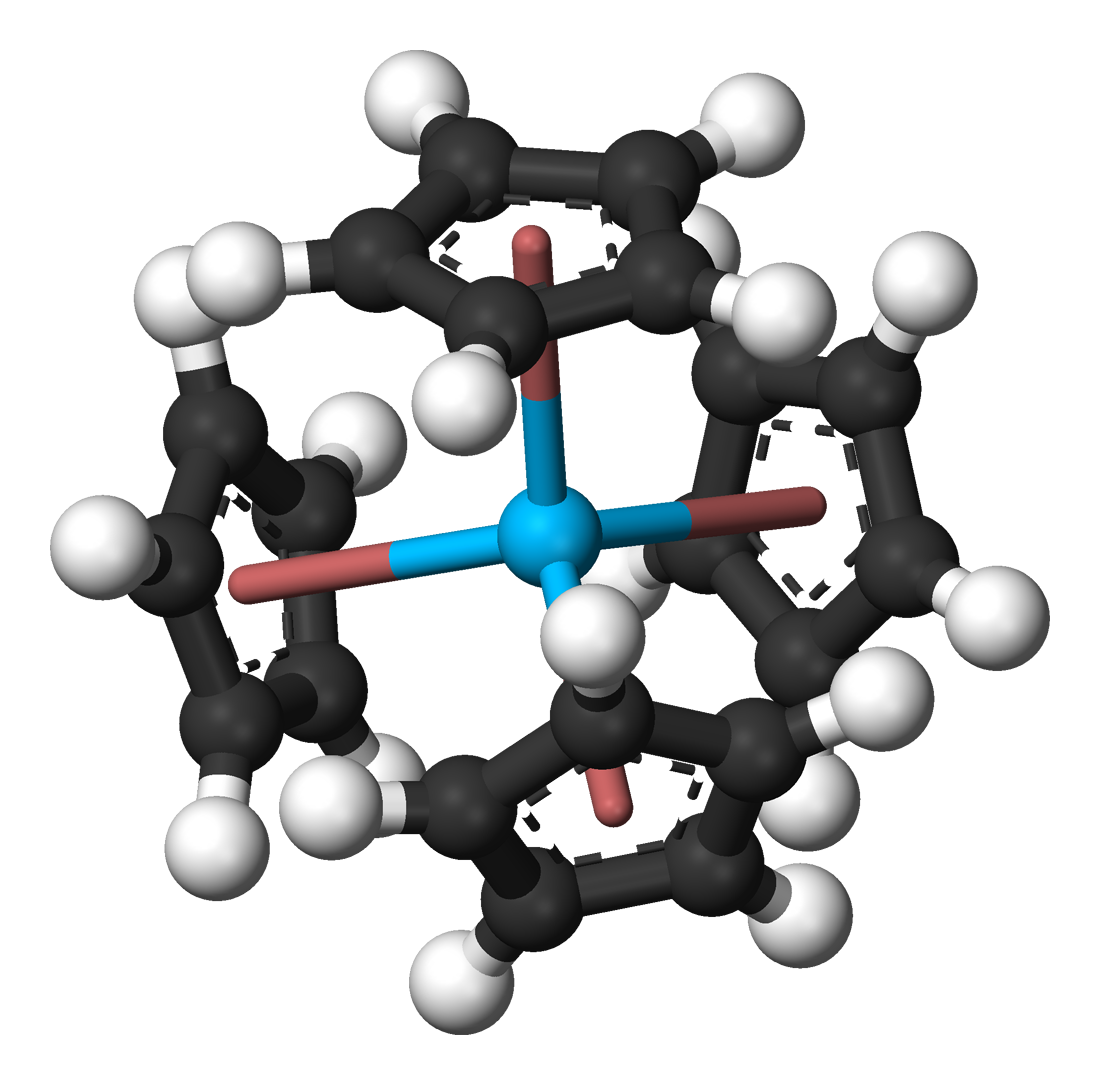
Tetrakis(cyclopentadienyl)thorium(IV), an organoactinide compound

Organoactinide chemistry is the science exploring the properties, structure, and reactivity of organoactinide compounds, which are organometallic compounds containing a carbon to actinide chemical bond.

Like most organometallic compounds, the organoactinides are air sensitive and need to be handled using the appropriate methods.

== Organometallic complexes with σ-bonding ==
Most common organoactinide complexes involve π-bonding with ligands such as cyclopentadienyl, but there are a few exceptions with σ-bonding, namely in thorium and uranium chemistry as these are the most easily handleable elements of this group.

=== Alkyl and aryl compounds ===
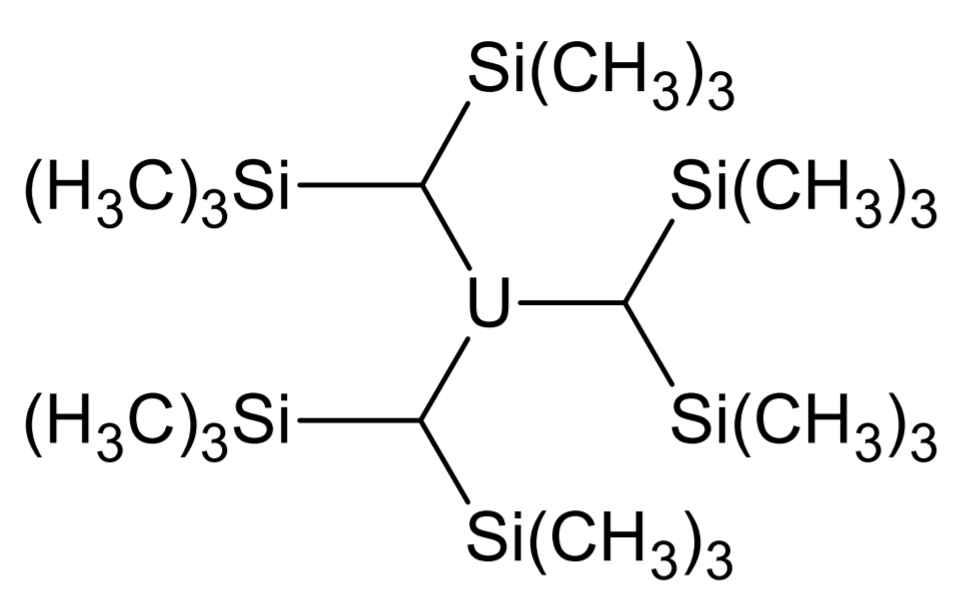
U[CH(SiMe_{3})_{2}]_{3}, the first uranium alkyl compound to be synthesized

Attempts to synthesize uranium alkyls were first made during the Manhattan project by Henry Gilman, inspired by the volatility of main group organometallics. However he noticed that these compounds tend to be highly unstable.

Marks and Seyam attempted to synthesize them from UCl_{4} using organolithium reagents, but these decomposed quickly.

In 1989, a group finally synthesized a homoleptic complex with trimethylsilyl groups: U[CH(SiMe_{3})_{2}]_{3}. Since then, variants of higher coordination numbers such as [Li(TMEDA)]_{2}[UMe_{6}] have also been synthesized.

On the other hand, only one homoleptic thorium alkyl is known. The seven coordinate heptamethylthorate(IV) anion was synthesized in 1984 using a similar procedure to the equivalent uranium complex.

Mixed phosphine containing complexes of thorium and uranium tetramethyls have also been made, using dmpe as the organophosphorus ligand stabilising the structure (amides can also assume this role).

=== Metallacycles ===
Uranium and thorium both form metallacycles with a diverse chemistry. These complexes are very labile so trimethylsilyl groups are again present for protection. These compounds are formed by reacting weaker alkylating agents (LiCH_{3} and Mg(CH_{3})_{2} are too strong and lead to the formation of simple alkyls) with ClAn[N(Si(CH_{3})_{2}]_{3} (An = Th, U).

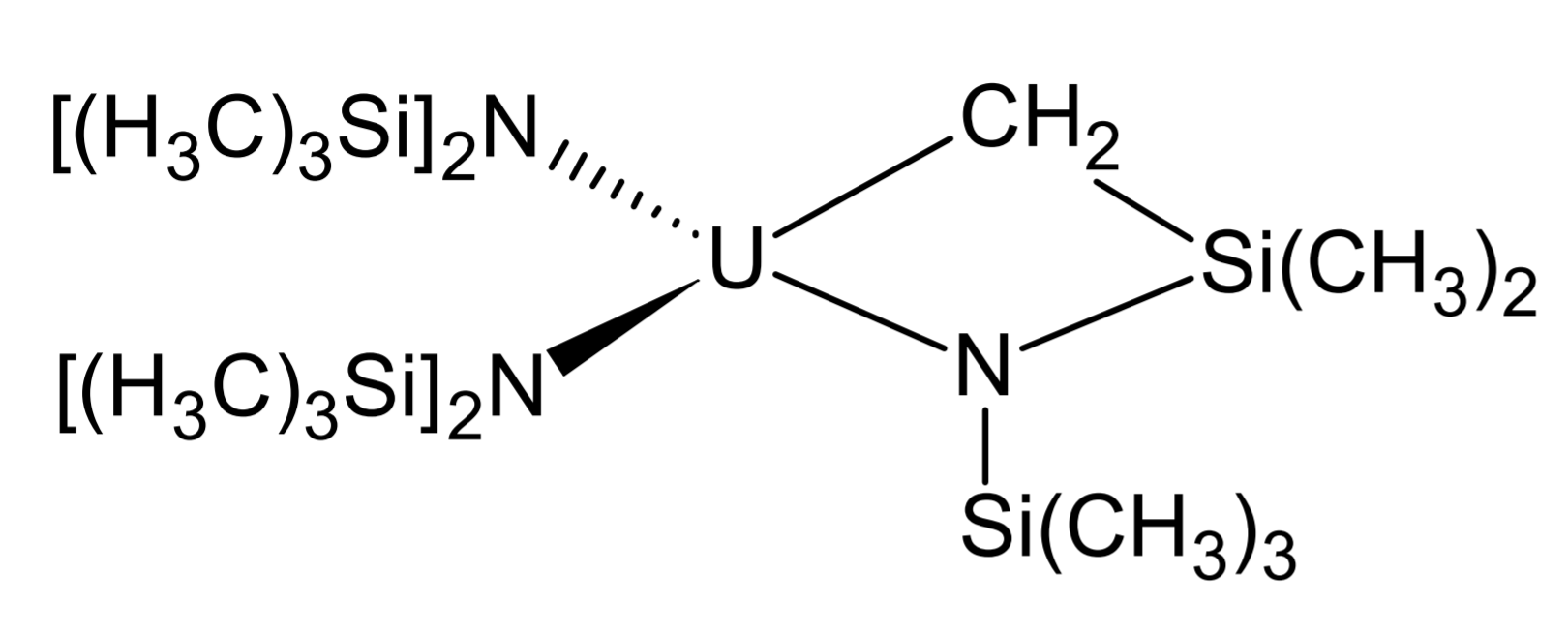
a uranium-containing metallacycle

== Organometallic complexes with π-bonding ==
A large majority of the organoactinides involve Cyclopentadienyl (Cp) or Cyclooctatetraene (COT) and their derivatives as ligands. These usually take part in η^{5}- and η^{8}-bonding, donating electron density through their π orbitals.

=== Cyclooctatetraene complexes ===
==== Actinocenes ====
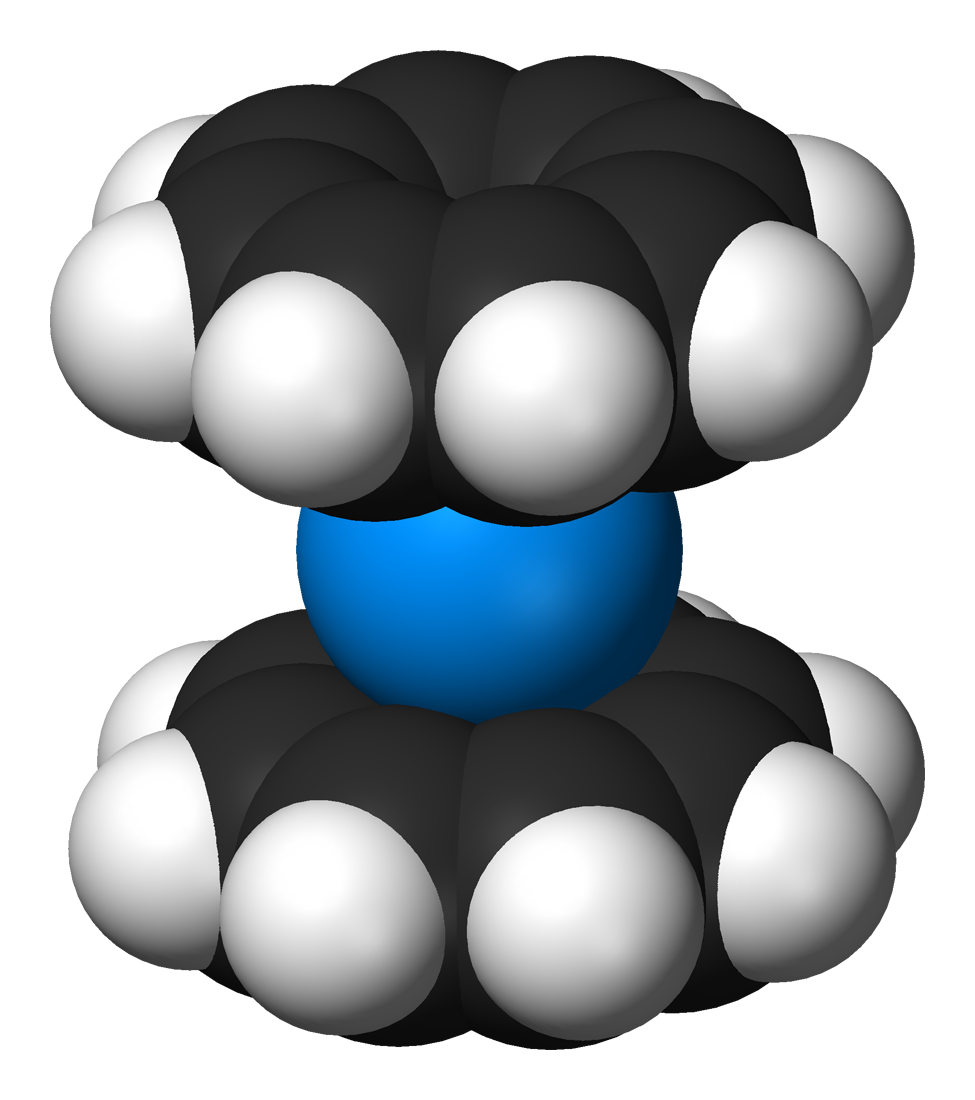
A sandwich compound with two cyclooctatetraene ligands

Actinides form sandwich complexes with cyclooctatetraene analogously to how transition metals react with cyclopentadienyl ligands. Actinide ions have atomic radii that are too large to form MCp_{2} compounds, so that they prefer to react with C_{8}H_{8}^{2-} ions instead.

The first example of this type of chemical species was discovered in 1968 by Andrew Streitwieser, who prepared uranocene by reacting K_{2}(COT) with UCl_{4} in tetrahydrofuran at 0 °C. The compound itself is a pyrophoric green solid that is otherwise quite unreactive.

The original synthesis of uranocene

Most tetravalent actinides react similarly to form actinocenes:

Bis(cyclooctatetraene)protactinium was first prepared in 1973 by turning protactinium(V) oxide into the pentachloride and reducing it with aluminium powder before reacting it with potassium cyclooctatetraenide.

$$\ce{Pa2O5 + SOCl2  ->[400C] PaCl5}$$

$$\ce{3PaCl5 + Al -> 3PaCl4 + AlCl3}$$

$$\ce{PaCl4 + 2K2(COT) -> Pa(COT)2 + 4KCl}$$

Neptunocene and thorocene were made similarly using the tetrachlorides. Plutonocene is the exception here: as there is no stable plutonium(IV) chloride known, (Hpy)_{2}PuCl_{6} had to be used.

The later actinides also form complexes with COT but these don't usually assume the classic neutral sandwich structure. Trivalent actinides form ionic compounds with COT ligands, this can be exemplified by the reaction of americium triiodide with K_{2}COT.

$$\ce{AmI3 + K2(COT) -> KAm(COT)2}$$

This compound is present in solution as the THF adduct.

==== Complexes of substituted cyclooctatetraenes ====
Due to the drawbacks of the unsubstituted cyclooctatetraene (COT) ligand in organoactinide chemistry, namely low solubility and poor crystallinity, substituted COT ligands are often employed in the synthesis of actinocene complexes.

Many substituted uranocenes have been synthesized. The methodology followed was the same as for simple U(COT)_{2}, but the properties of some of the compounds were found to be different.

The tetraphenylcyclooctatetraene complex was found to be completely air stable by Streitwieser. This high stability is probably due to the hindering effects of the phenyl groups, protecting the U^{4+} center from an attack by oxygen.

All these derivatives are much more soluble in organic solvents such as benzene, in which they form green solutions that are more air sensitive than the crystalline solids.

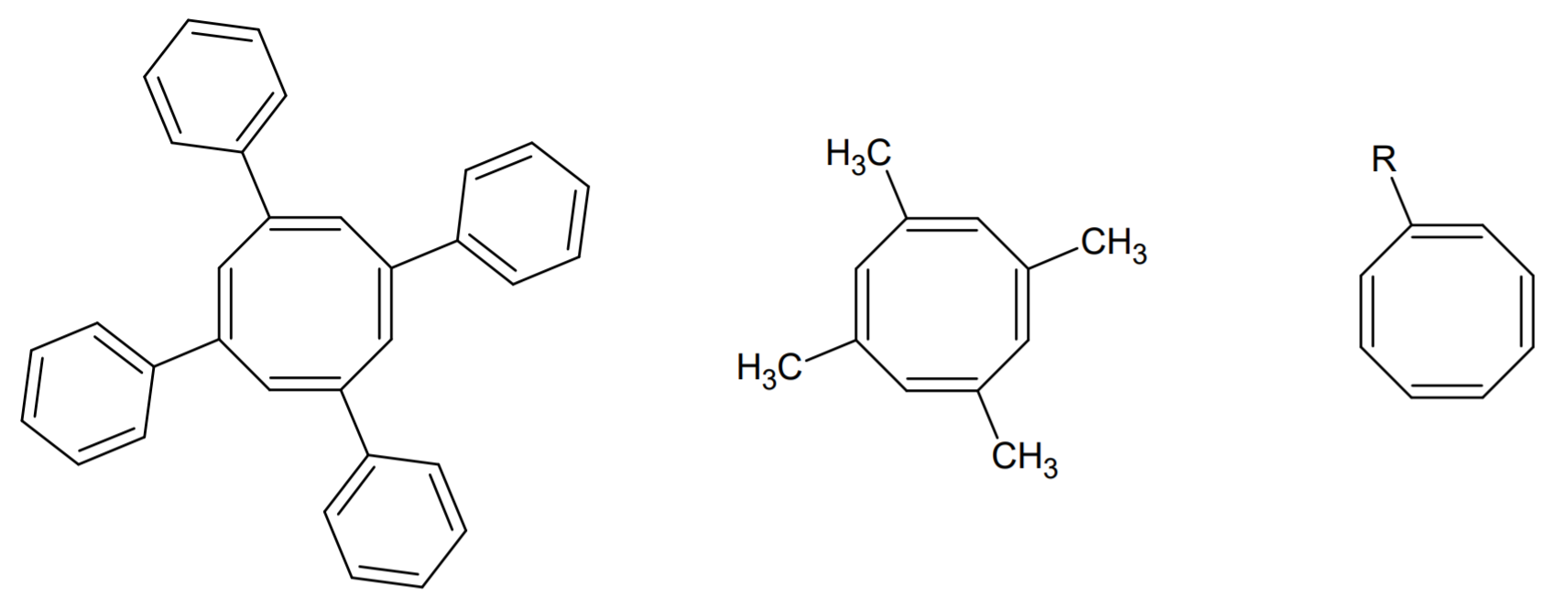
Substituted cyclooctatetraene ligands

Plutonium also forms a sandwich complex with 1,4-bis(trimethylsilyl)cyclooctatetraenyl (1,4-COT’’) and its 1,3 isomer. This compound is prepared by the oxidation of the anionic green Pu(III) complex Li(THF)_{4}[Pu(1,4-COT’’)_{2}] with cobalt(II) chloride which leads to the formation of Pu(1,4-COT’’)(1,3-COT’’). The reaction is easily noticeable by the THF solution changing to a dark red colour, characteristic of Pu(IV).

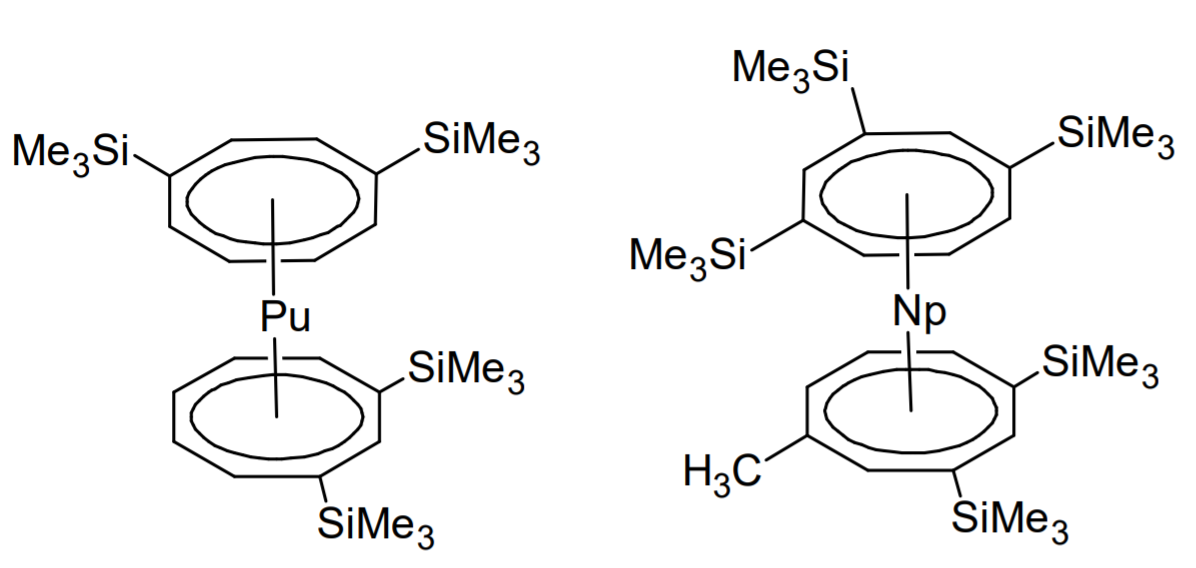
The structures of Pu(3-COT’’)(4-COT’’) and Np(COT’’’)_{2}

The neptunium equivalent with the trisubstituted COT’’’ has also been reported and the complexes of both the tri- and di- substituted ligands with thorium and uranium are well known. They were synthesized according to the following reaction schemes:

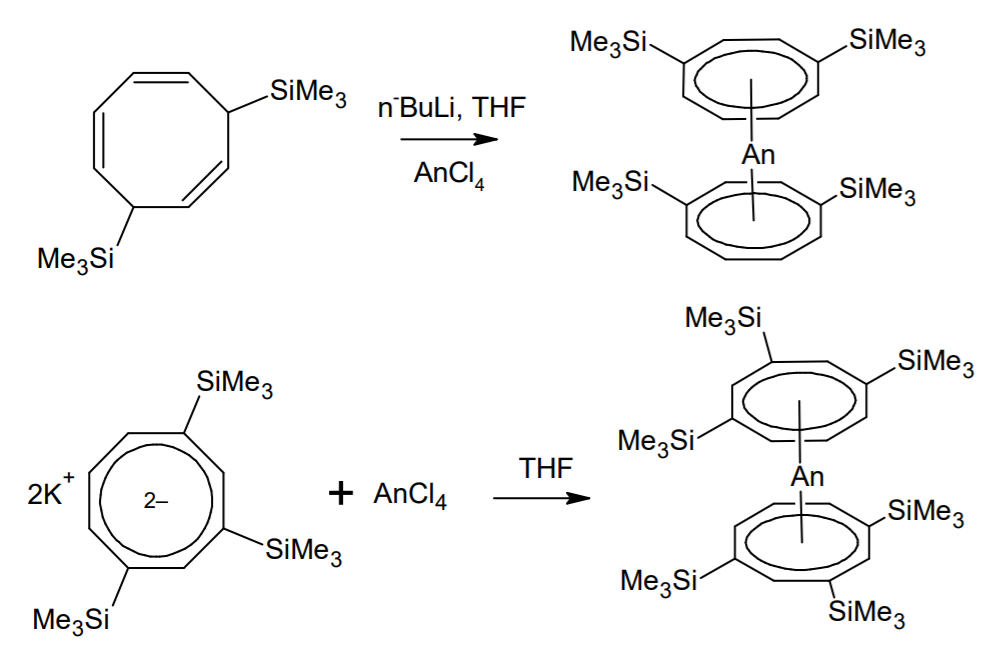
An = Th, U

Due to limited isotope availability and scarcity of laboratory infrastructure, transplutonium organoactinide complexes are rarely isolated. In 2025, utilizing a hexahydrodicyclopenta[8]annulene ligand (hdcCOT) and 0.3 milligrams of berkelium-249, researchers at Lawrence Berkeley National Laboratory synthesized berkelocene, the first actinocene with a new actinide in over 50 years. The indigo crystals of the complex were characterized, with coordination resembling that of uranocene.

=== Cyclopentadiene complexes ===
==== Tris(cyclopentadienyl)actinide complexes ====
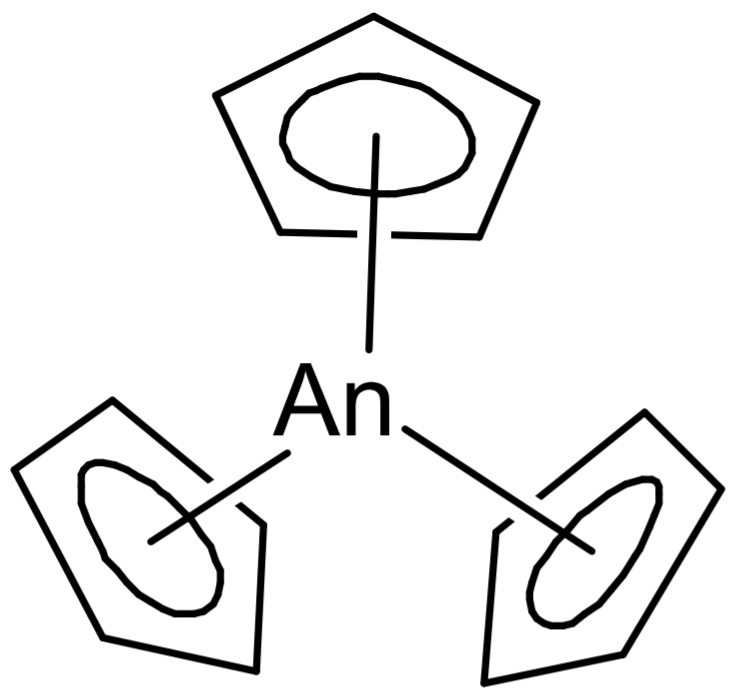
The general structure of tris(cyclopentadiene)actinide complexes

Most trivalent f block elements form compounds with cyclopentadiene with the formula M(Cp)_{3}. These complexes have been isolated up to californium, with the einsteinium equivalent having been observed in the gas phase.

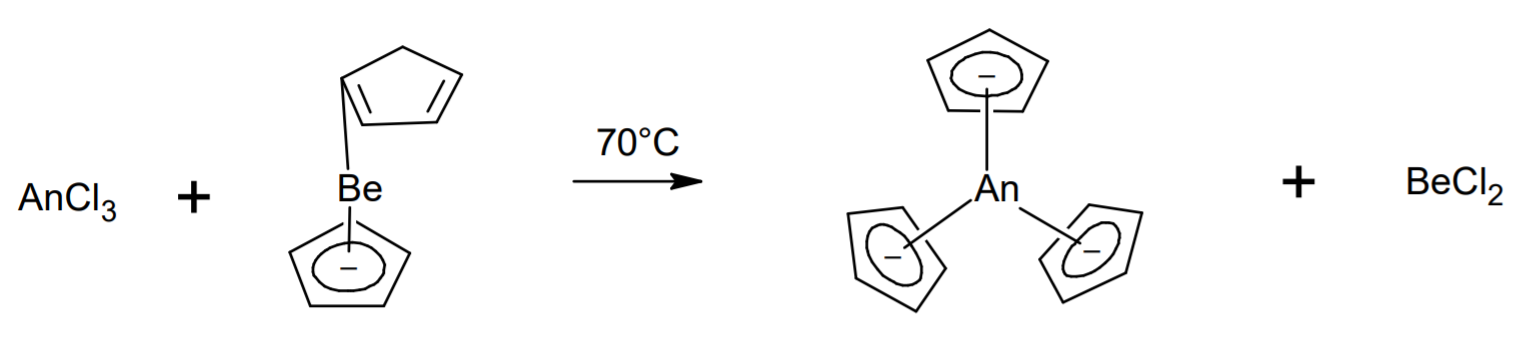
An = Th, U, Np, Pu, Am, Cm, Bk, Cf

The synthesis of the AnCp_{3} usually follows the reaction scheme shown above with a few more added steps that are sometimes needed to synthesize the trichlorides from the commercially supplied oxides. Nevertheless, other syntheses are also used by some authors: alkali metal cyclopentadienides can be used instead of the beryllium complex, and An(IV) complexes can also be used via a reductive elimination reaction.

The colours of AnCp_{3} complexes:
Th	U	Np	Pu	Am	Cm	Bk	Cf
green	brown	pale green	green	flesh	colourless	amber	red

These compounds have been known since the sixties, however until 2017 only the neptunium compound was structurally characterised. Kovàcs and coworkers were able to analyse the plutonium and uranium complexes, finding that all three structures were similar, with an asymmetrical distribution of cyclopentadienide ligands and a higher covalent character to the carbon-actinide bond than in organolanthanide compounds.

==== Tetrakis(cyclopentadienyl)actinide complexes ====
Tetravalent thorium, uranium and neptunium easily form MCp_{4} compounds by a metathesis reaction from potassium cyclopentadienide using benzene as a solvent.

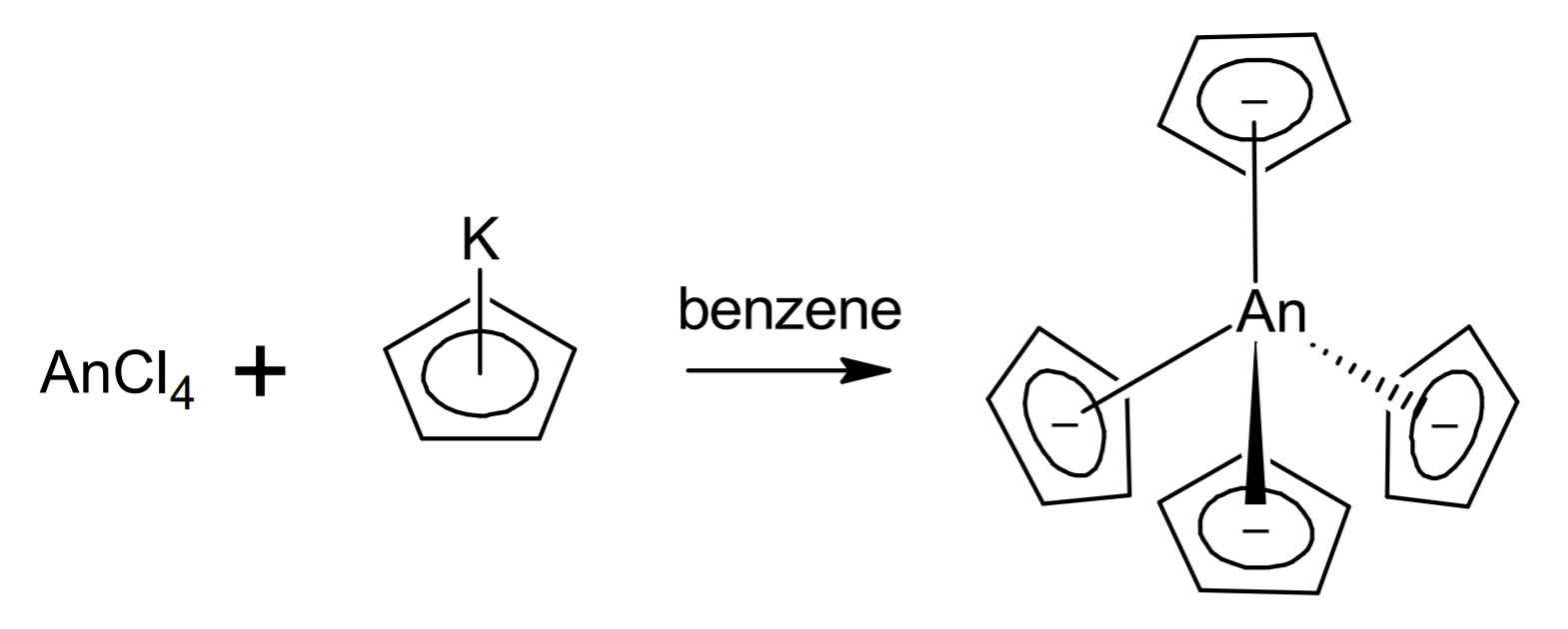
An= Th, U, Np

=== Cycloheptatriene complexes ===
Though less widely studied, actinide complexes with the heptahapto cycloheptatrienyl (Ch) ion have been predicted to exist and the uranium species U(Ch)_{2}^{−} synthesized. These complexes are predicted to be oxidizing. Due to the contraction of the 5f-orbital, actinide cycloheptatriene complexes are expected to decrease in stability with higher atomic numbers.

== See also ==
- Organothorium chemistry
- Organouranium chemistry
- Organoneptunium chemistry
- Actinocenes
  - Uranocene, U(C_{8}H_{8})_{2}
  - Neptunocene, Np(C_{8}H_{8})_{2}
  - Plutonocene, Pu(C_{8}H_{8})_{2}
