= Organothorium chemistry =

Study of the carbon-thorium bond

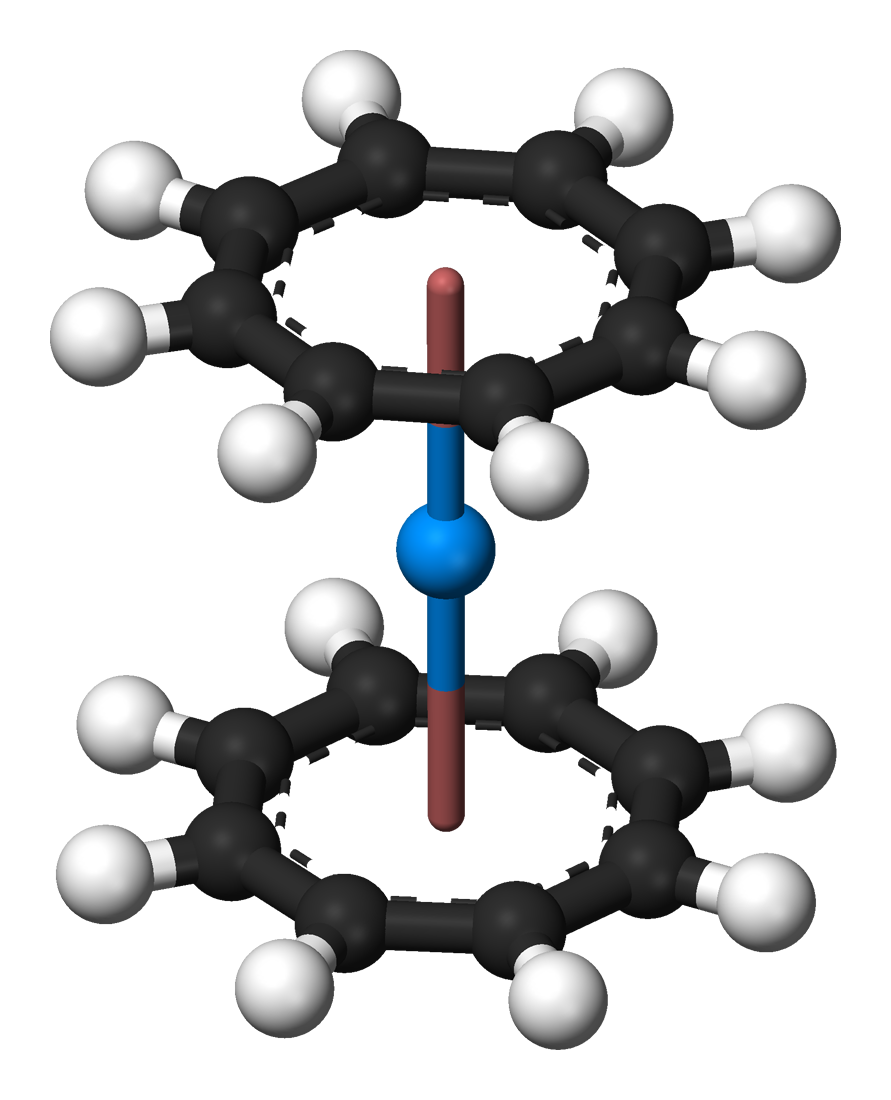
Structure of thorocene

Organothorium chemistry describes the synthesis and properties of organothorium compounds, chemical compounds containing a carbon to thorium chemical bond.

Most of the work on organothorium compounds has focused on the cyclopentadienyls and cyclooctatetraenyls. Like many of the early and middle actinides (thorium through americium, and also expected for curium), thorium forms the yellow cyclooctatetraenide complex Th(C_{8}H_{8})_{2}, thorocene. It is isotypic with the more well-known analogous uranium compound, uranocene. Although these f-series cyclooctatetraenyls are not isotypic with the d-series cyclopentadienyls, including the more famous ferrocene, they have very similar structures, and were named to emphasise this resemblance. It can be prepared by reacting K_{2}C_{8}H_{8} with thorium tetrachloride in tetrahydrofuran (THF) at the temperature of dry ice, or by reacting thorium tetrafluoride with MgC_{8}H_{8}. It is an unstable compound in air and outright decomposes in water or at 190 °C. Half-sandwich compounds are also known, such as 2(η^{8}-C_{8}H_{8})ThCl_{2}(THF)_{2}, which has a piano-stool structure and is made by reacting thorocene with thorium tetrachloride in tetrahydrofuran.

The simplest of the cyclopentadienyls are Th^{III}(C_{5}H_{5})_{3} and Th^{IV}(C_{5}H_{5})_{4}: many derivatives are known. The first (which has two forms, one purple and one green) is a rare example of thorium in the formal +3 oxidation state. In the derivative [Th^{III}{η^{5}-C_{5}H_{3}(SiMe_{3})_{2}}_{3}], a blue paramagnetic compound, the molecular geometry is trigonal planar around the thorium atom, which has a [Rn]6d^{1} configuration instead of the expected [Rn]5f^{1}. [Th^{III}{η^{5}-C_{5}H_{3}(SiMe_{3})_{2}}_{3}] can be reduced to the anion [Th^{II}{η^{5}-C_{5}H_{3}(SiMe_{3})_{2}}_{3}]^{−}, in which thorium exhibits a very rare +2 oxidation state. The second is prepared by heating thorium tetrachloride with K(C_{5}H_{5}) under reflux in benzene: the four cyclopentadienyl rings are arranged tetrahedrally around the central thorium atom. The halide derivative Th(C_{5}H_{5})_{3}Cl can be made similarly by reducing the amount of K(C_{5}H_{5}) used (other univalent metal cyclopentadienyls can also be used), and the chlorine atom may be further replaced by other halogens or by alkoxy, alkyl, aryl, or BH_{4} groups. Of these, the alkyl and aryl derivatives have been investigated more deeply due to the insight they give regarding the nature of the Th–C σ bond. Of special interest is the dimer [Th(η^{5}-C_{5}H_{5})_{2}-μ-(η^{5},η^{1}-C_{5}H_{5})]_{2}, where the two thorium atoms are bridged by two cyclopentadienyl rings, similarly to the structure of niobocene.

Tetrabenzylthorium, Th(CH_{2}C_{6}H_{5}), is known, but its structure has not yet been determined. Thorium forms the monocapped trigonal prismatic anion [Th(CH_{3})_{7}]^{3−}, heptamethylthorate, which forms the salt [Li(tmeda)]_{3}[ThMe_{7}] (tmeda = Me_{2}NCH_{2}CH_{2}NMe_{2}). Although one methyl group is only attached to the thorium atom (Th–C distance 257.1 pm) and the other six connect the lithium and thorium atoms (Th–C distances 265.5–276.5 pm) they behave equivalently in solution. Tetramethylthorium, Th(CH_{3})_{4}, is not known, but its adducts are stabilised by phosphine ligands.

== Bibliography ==
- Wickleder, Mathias S.; Fourest, Blandine; Dorhout, Peter K. (2006). "Thorium". In Morss, Lester R.; Edelstein, Norman M.; Fuger, Jean (eds.). The Chemistry of the Actinide and Transactinide Elements (PDF). Vol. 3 (3rd ed.). Dordrecht, the Netherlands: Springer. pp. 52–160. doi:10.1007/1-4020-3598-5_3. ISBN 978-1-4020-3555-5. Archived from the original (PDF) on 2016-03-07.
