= Edward Kosower =

American chemist (1929–2022)

Edward Malcolm Kosower (February 2, 1929 – April 7, 2022) was an American-Israeli chemist.

Kosower was born in Brooklyn, New York on February 2, 1929 and attended high school at Stuyvesant, where he was a classmate of fellow chemist Andrew Streitwieser.

He received his B.S. degree from the Massachusetts Institute of Technology in 1948 and Ph.D. from the University of California, Los Angeles in 1952 under the mentorship of Saul Winstein. After postdoctoral research at Basel with Cyril Grob, and then at Harvard with Frank Westheimer, he began his independent career as assistant professor at Lehigh University (1954) and the University of Wisconsin (1956). In 1961, he moved to Stony Brook University as associate professor where he was later promoted to full professor. In 1972, he moved to Tel Aviv University, where he was named the Josef Kryss Professor of Biophysical Organic Chemistry in 1992.

He was a Guggenheim Fellow from 1977 to 1978, and was a member of the American Association for the Advancement of Science.

He is best known for his earlier work in physical organic chemistry and later work in biophysical chemistry. In particular, he developed the Z scale for solvent polarity based on the solvatochromic effect for zwitterionic dyes and investigated bimane dyes as fluorescent labels.

Kosower is the author of an early textbook on physical organic chemistry, An Introduction to Physical Organic Chemistry (Wiley, 1968), and joined Streitwieser and Heathcock as coauthor of the 4th edition of their influential textbook, Introduction to Organic Chemistry (Macmillan, 1992).
