= Actinocene =

Class of chemical compounds

Skeletal formula

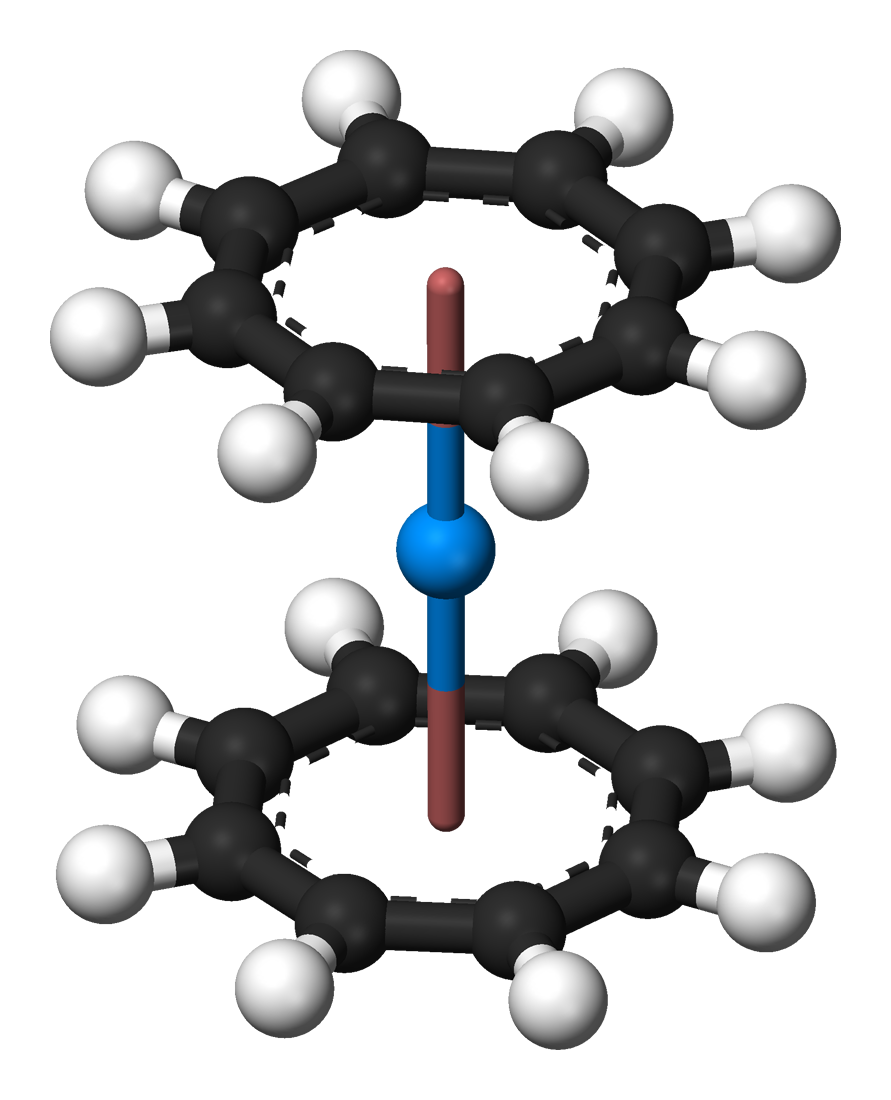
Ball-and-stick

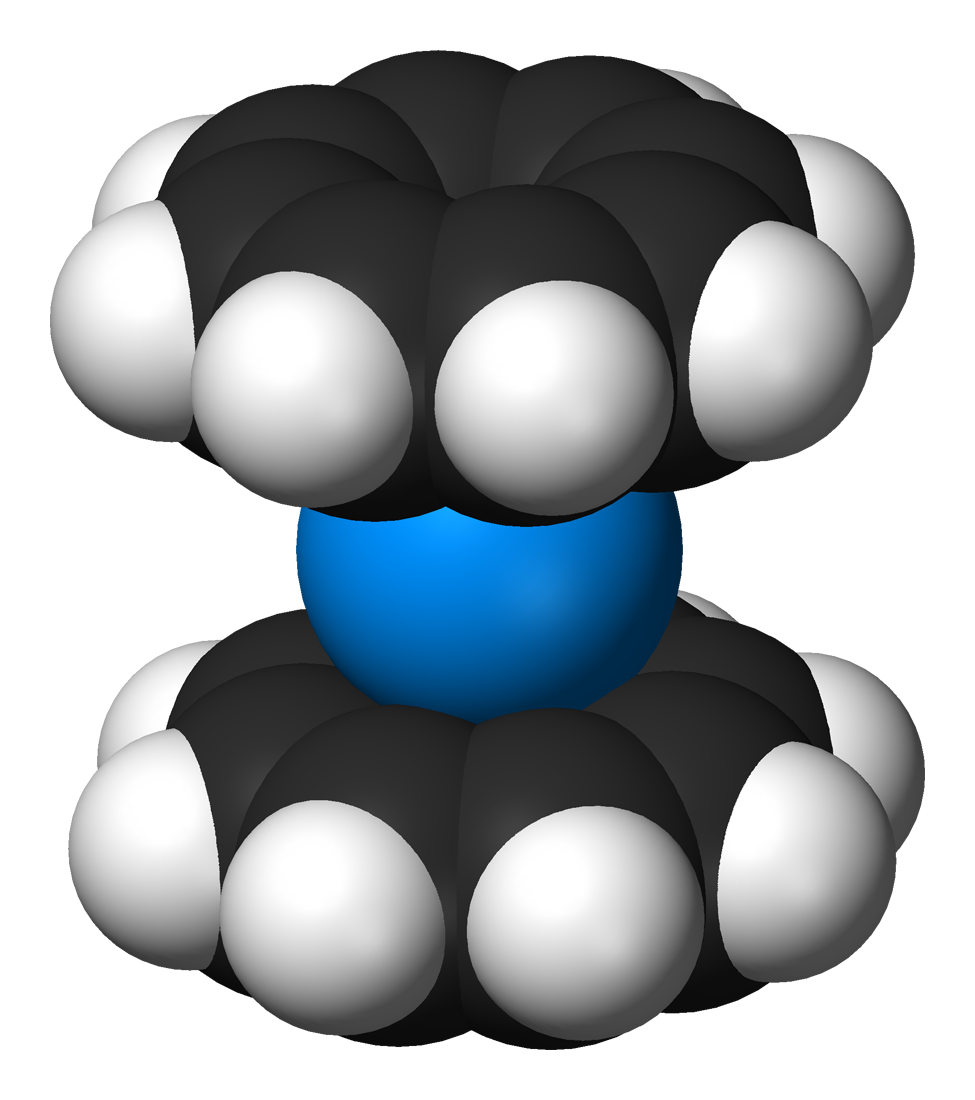
Space-filling

Uranocene molecular representations showing the U atom sandwiched between 2 COT^{2−} ligands

Actinocenes are a family of organoactinide compounds consisting of metallocenes containing elements from the actinide series. They typically have a sandwich structure with two dianionic cyclooctatetraenyl ligands (COT^{2−}, which is C_{8}H^{2−}_{8}) bound to an actinide-metal center (An) in the oxidation state IV, resulting in the general formula An(C_{8}H_{8})_{2}.

== Characterised actinocenes ==
Name	Formula	An^{IV} centre	First synthesis	Crystal colour	An–COT distance (Å)	Space group
Thorocene	Th(C_{8}H_{8})_{2}	Th	1969	bright yellow	2.004	P2_{1}/n
Protactinocene	Pa(C_{8}H_{8})_{2}	Pa	1974	yellowish	1.933 (calculated)	P2_{1}/n
Uranocene	U(C_{8}H_{8})_{2}	U	1968	deep green	1.926	P2_{1}/n
Neptunocene	Np(C_{8}H_{8})_{2}	Np	1970	yellow-brown	1.909	P2_{1}/n
Plutonocene	Pu(C_{8}H_{8})_{2}	Pu	1970	dark red	1.898	I2/m
Berkelocene (Note: Berkelocene was prepared with an annulated COT ligand, hexahydrodicyclopenta[8]annulene (hdcCOT); its properties are not strictly comparable to the other COT-ligated actinocenes in this table, but rather those also prepared with hdcCOT.)	Bk(C_{14}H_{16})_{2}	Bk	2025	indigo	1.88	P1̅

The most studied actinocene is uranocene, U(C_{8}H_{8})_{2}, which in 1968 was the first member of this family to be synthesised and is still viewed as the archetypal example. Other actinocenes that have been synthesised are protactinocene (Pa(C_{8}H_{8})_{2}), thorocene (Th(C_{8}H_{8})_{2}), neptunocene (Np(C_{8}H_{8})_{2}), and plutonocene (Pu(C_{8}H_{8})_{2}). Especially the latter two, neptunocene and plutonocene, have not been extensively studied experimentally since the 1980s because of the radiation hazard they pose. Berkelocene (with a modified COT ligand) was synthesised in 2025, the first actinocene with a new actinide in over 50 years.

== Bonding ==
The actinide-cyclooctatetraenyl bonding has been of interest for multiple theoretical studies. Computational chemistry methods indicate bonding with a large covalent character resulting mainly from the mixing of actinide 6d orbitals with ligand π-orbitals, with a smaller interaction involving the actinide 5f and ligand π-orbitals. The covalent component is characterised by donation of electron density to the actinide. This donation is notably reduced in berkelocene relative to other characterized actinocenes, due to the stable 5f^{7} electron configuration of Bk^{4+}.

== Related compounds ==
Analogous sandwiched M(C_{8}H_{8})_{2} compounds also exist for lanthanides M = Nd, Tb, and Yb, but therein the bonding is mostly ionic rather than covalent (see lanthanocenes).

== See also ==
- Organoactinide chemistry
- f-block metallocene
