= Bromobimane =

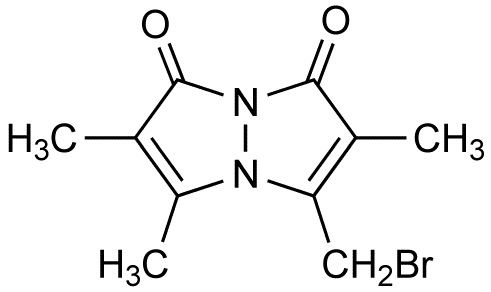

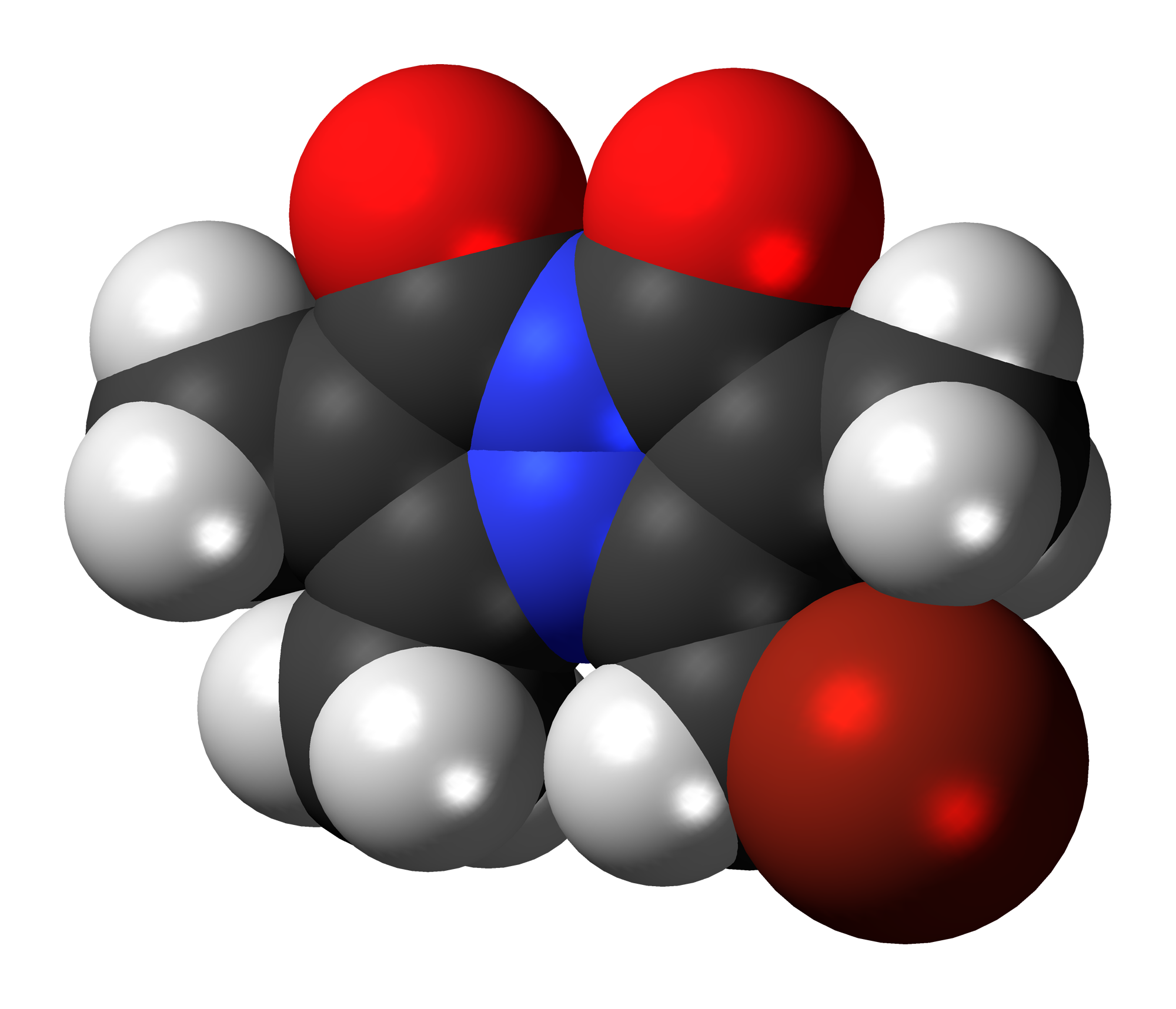

Names
- Preferred IUPAC name 3-(Bromomethyl)-2,5,6-trimethyl-1H,7H-pyrazolo[1,2-a]pyrazole-1,7-dione
- Other names Bromobimane, mBBr

Identifiers
CAS Number	71418-44-5
3D model (JSmol)	Interactive image
ChemSpider	102775
PubChem CID	114810
UNII	V23UK0CYXL
CompTox Dashboard (EPA)	DTXSID70221609
- InChI: InChI=1S/C10H11BrN2O2/c1-5-7(3)12-8(4-11)6(2)10(15)13(12)9(5)14/h4H2,1-3H3 Key: AHEWZZJEDQVLOP-UHFFFAOYSA-N; InChI=1/C10H11BrN2O2/c1-5-7(3)12-8(4-11)6(2)10(15)13(12)9(5)14/h4H2,1-3H3 Key: AHEWZZJEDQVLOP-UHFFFAOYAR
- SMILES: O=C1\C(=C(/N2/C(=C(\C(=O)N12)C)CBr)C)C

Properties
Chemical formula	C_{10}H_{11}BrN_{2}O_{2}
Molar mass	271.114 g·mol^{−1}
Melting point	152 to 154 °C (306 to 309 °F; 425 to 427 K)
Solubility in water	in MeOH, DMF, DMSO

Hazards
- Occupational safety and health (OHS/OSH)
Main hazards	alkylating agent
- Except where otherwise noted, data are given for materials in their standard state (at 25 °C [77 °F], 100 kPa). verify (what is ?) Infobox references

Bromobimane or monobromobimane is a heterocyclic compound and bimane dye that is used as a reagent in biochemistry. While bromobimane itself is essentially nonfluorescent, it alkylates thiol groups, displacing the bromine and adding the fluorescent tag (λ_{emission} = 478 nm) to the thiol. Its alkylating properties are comparable to iodoacetamide.

== Synthesis ==
Bromobimane is prepared from 3,4-dimethyl-2-pyrazolin-5-one (a condensation product of ethyl 2-methylacetoacetate with hydrazine) by chlorination followed by basic treatment; with aqueous K_{2}CO_{3} under heterogeneous conditions, the required syn-bimane, 2,3,5,6-tetramethyl-1H,7H-pyrazolo[1,2-a]pyrazole-1,7-dione, is the major product. It can then be selectively brominated to the target bromobimane (with 1 equivalent of Br_{2}; or dibromobimane, if 2 equivalents of Br_{2} are used):

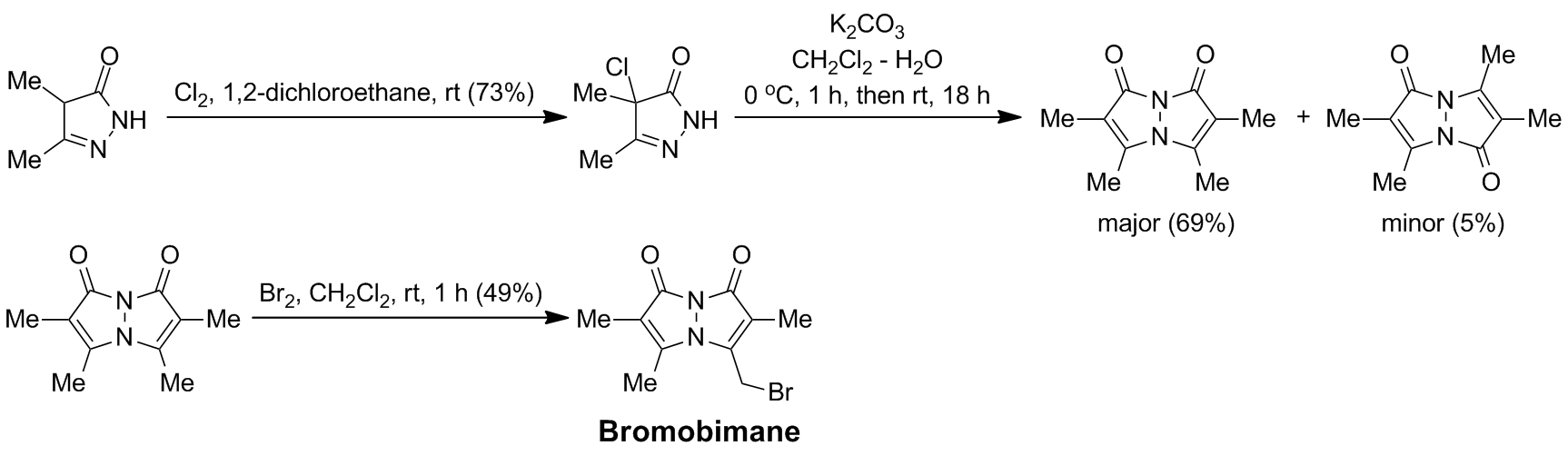
Bromobimane synthesis

Bromobimanes are light-sensitive compounds and should be kept refrigerated and protected from light.
