= Plutonocene =

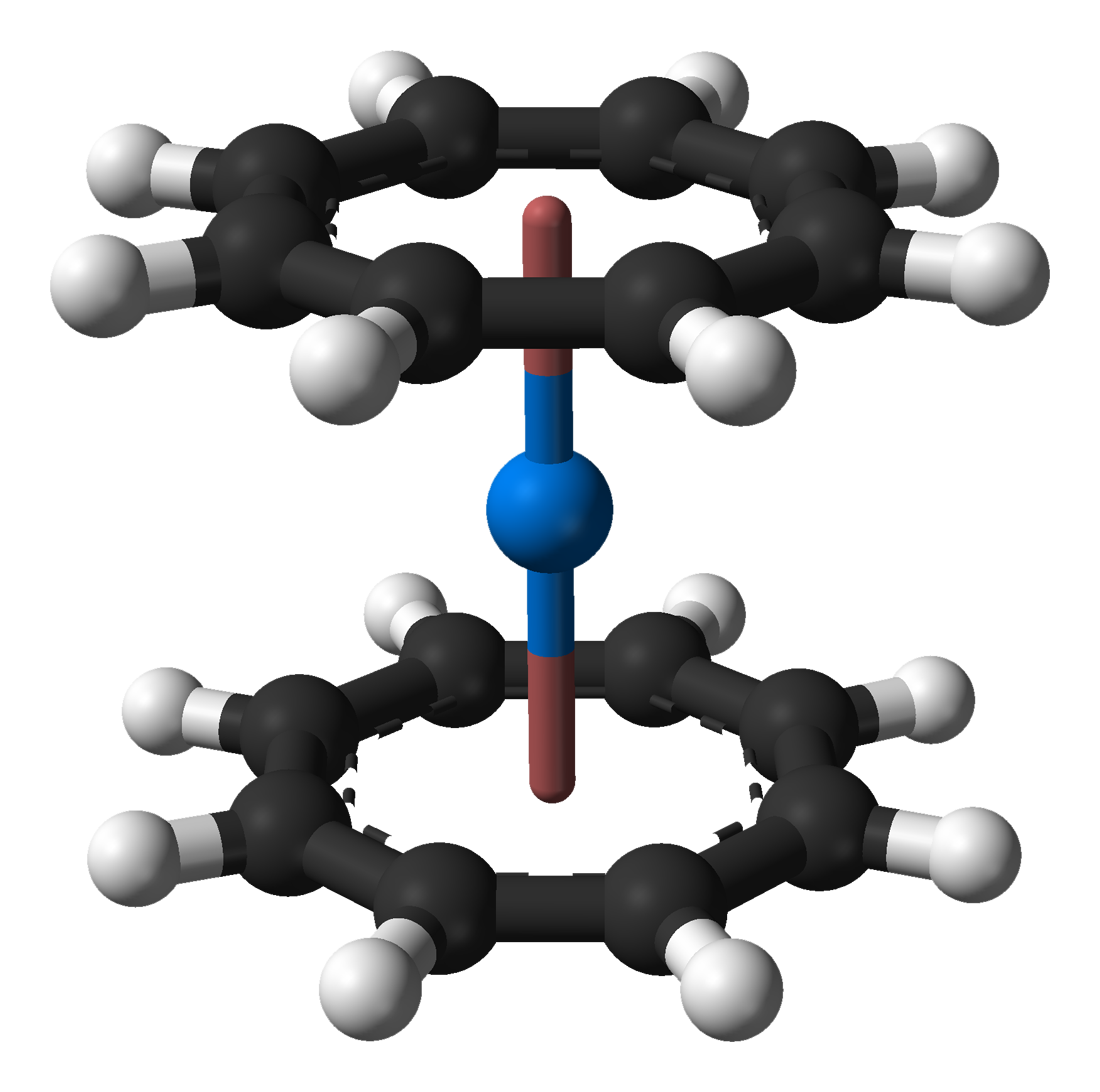

Names
- IUPAC name Bis(η^{8}-cyclooctatetraene)plutonium
- Other names Plutonium cyclooctatetraenide Pu(COT)_{2}

Identifiers
CAS Number	37281-23-5
3D model (JSmol)	Interactive image
PubChem CID	171041248
- InChI: InChI=1S/2C8H8.Pu/c2*1-2-4-6-8-7-5-3-1;/h2*1-8H;/b2*2-1-,3-1-,4-2-,5-3-,6-4-,7-5-,8-6-,8-7-; Key: DFMONSHXBOWXGP-OGVMWVNQSA-N
- SMILES: c1=c[cH-]c=c[cH-]c=c1.[Pu+4].c1=c[cH-]c=c[cH-]c=c1

Properties
Chemical formula	C_{16}H_{16}Pu
Molar mass	452 g·mol^{−1}
Appearance	cherry red crystals
Solubility in water	insoluble, does not react with water
Solubility in chlorocarbons	sparingly soluble (ca. 0.5 g/L)

Hazards
- Occupational safety and health (OHS/OSH)
Main hazards	radiation hazard, pyrophoric, toxic
- Except where otherwise noted, data are given for materials in their standard state (at 25 °C [77 °F], 100 kPa). Infobox references

Plutonocene, Pu(C_{8}H_{8})_{2}, is an organoplutonium compound composed of a plutonium atom sandwiched between two cyclooctatetraenide (COT^{2-}) rings. It is a dark red, very air-sensitive solid that is sparingly soluble in toluene and chlorocarbons. Plutonocene is a member of the actinocene family of metallocenes incorporating actinide elements in the +4 oxidation state.

Compared to other actinocenes such as uranocene, plutonocene has been studied to a lesser degree since the 1980s due to the notable radiation hazard posed by the compound. Instead, it has mostly been the subject of theoretical studies relating to the bonding in the molecule.

== Structure and bonding ==
The compound has been structurally characterised by single crystal XRD. The cyclooctatetraenide rings are eclipsed and assume a planar conformation with 8 equivalent C–C bonds of 1.41 Å length; the molecule possesses a centre of inversion at the position occupied by the plutonium atom. The Pu–COT distance (to the ring centroid) is 1.90 Å and the individual Pu–C distances are in the 2.63–2.64 Å range.

Despite the similarity in molecular structures, plutonocene crystals are not isomorphous to other actinocenes, as plutonocene crystallises in the monoclinic I2/m space group whereas thorocene, protactinocene, uranocene and neptunocene all crystallise as monoclinic P2_{1}/n.

Theoretical calculations utilising various computational chemistry methods support the existence of an enhanced covalent character in plutonocene from the interaction of Pu 6d and 5f atomic orbitals with ligand-based π orbitals.

== Synthesis ==
Plutonocene was first synthesized in 1970 from the reaction of tetraethylammonium hexachloroplutonate(IV) ([N(C_{2}H_{5})_{4}]_{2}PuCl_{6}) with dipotassium cyclooctatetraenide (K_{2}(C_{8}H_{8})) in THF at room temperature:

(NEt_{4})_{2}PuCl_{6} + 2 K_{2}(C_{8}H_{8}) → Pu(C_{8}H_{8})_{2} + 2 NEt_{4}Cl + 4 KCl

This approach is different compared to the synthesis of other actinocenes which usually involves the reaction of the actinide tetrachloride AnCl_{4} with K_{2}(C_{8}H_{8}). That approach is not possible in the case of plutonium, as solid PuCl_{4} is not known. The reaction also does not work when using the caesium or pyridinium hexachloroplutonate(IV) salts in the place of the tetraethylammonium one.

A more recent synthesis involves 1 e^{−} oxidation of the green [K(crypt)][Pu^{III}(C_{8}H_{8})_{2}] salt with AgI:

[Pu^{III}(C_{8}H_{8})_{2}]^{−} + AgI → Pu(C_{8}H_{8})_{2} + Ag^{0} + I^{−}

The [Pu^{III}(C_{8}H_{8})_{2}]^{−} anion is obtained via ligand substitution from K_{2}(C_{8}H_{8}) and other organoplutonium(III) complexes, which can be ultimately derived from reduction of the more common PuO_{2} with HBr in THF. Pu^{III} halides PuCl_{3} and PuI_{3} have also been used as the plutonium starting material.

== Other properties ==
The product is chemically analogous to uranocene and neptunocene, and they practically exhibit identical chemical reactivity. All three compounds are insensitive to water or dilute aqueous base, but are air-sensitive and react quickly to form oxides. They are only slightly soluble (with saturation concentrations of about 10^{−3} M) in aromatic or chlorinated solvents such as benzene, toluene, carbon tetrachloride or chloroform.
