= C6H4N2O2 =

The molecular formula C_{6}H_{4}N_{2}O_{2} (molar mass: 136.11 g/mol) may refer to:

- Bimane or syn-Bimane
- anti-Bimane(Pubchem: 54280186)
- Dinitrosobenzene
- diiminobenzoquinone
