= Organoneptunium chemistry =

Chemistry of organometallic compounds containing a neptunium-carbon bond

Organoneptunium chemistry is the chemical science exploring the properties, structure, and reactivity of organoneptunium compounds, which are organometallic compounds containing a carbon to neptunium chemical bond. Several such compounds exist even though the element itself, neptunium, is man-made and highly radioactive: tricyclopentadienylneptunium-chloride, tetrakis(cyclopentadienyl)neptunium(IV) and neptunocene Np(C_{8}H_{8})_{2}.

== See also ==
- Organoactinide chemistry
