= Neptunocene =

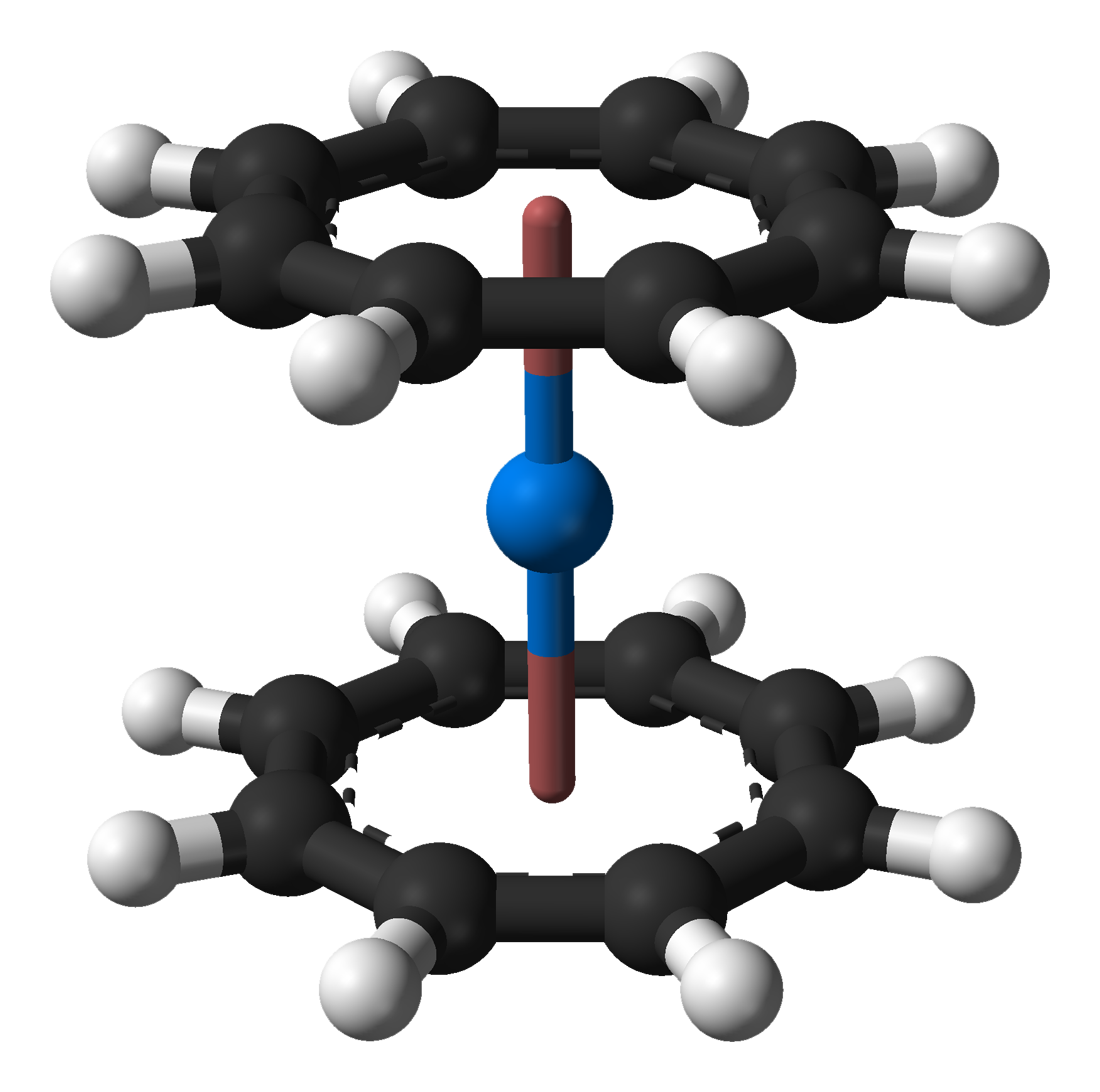

Names
- IUPAC name Bis(η^{8}-cyclooctatetraene)neptunium
- Other names Neptunium cyclooctatetraenide Np(COT)_{2}

Identifiers
CAS Number	154974-81-9
3D model (JSmol)	Interactive image
- InChI: InChI=1S/2C5H5.Np/c2*1-2-4-5-3-1;/h2*1-5H;/q2*-1;+2 Key: FXDJOXAJBKYPFW-UHFFFAOYSA-N
- SMILES: c1=c[cH-]c=c[cH-]c=c1.[Np+4].c1=c[cH-]c=c[cH-]c=c1

Properties
Chemical formula	C_{16}H_{16}Np
Molar mass	445 g·mol^{−1}
Appearance	dark brown crystals as a solid, yellow in dilute solution
Solubility in water	insoluble, does not react with water
Solubility in chlorocarbons	sparingly soluble (ca. 0.5 g/L)

Hazards
- Occupational safety and health (OHS/OSH)
Main hazards	radiation hazard, pyrophoric
- Except where otherwise noted, data are given for materials in their standard state (at 25 °C [77 °F], 100 kPa). Infobox references

Neptunocene, Np(C_{8}H_{8})_{2}, is an organoneptunium compound composed of a neptunium atom sandwiched between two cyclooctatetraenide (COT^{2-}) rings. As a solid it has a dark brown/red colour but it appears yellow when dissolved in chlorocarbons, in which it is sparingly soluble. The compound is quite air-sensitive.

It was one of the first organoneptunium compounds to be synthesised, and is a member of the actinocene family of actinide-based metallocenes.

== Structure ==
The sandwich structure of neptunocene has been determined by single crystal XRD. The COT^{2-} rings are found to be planar with 8 equivalent C–C bonds of 1.385 Å length, and sit parallel in an eclipsed conformation. The Np–COT distance (to the ring centroid) is 1.909 Å and the individual Np–C distances are 2.630 Å.

Neptunocene assumes a monoclinic crystal structure (P2_{1}/n space group) which is isomorphous to uranocene and thorocene but not to plutonocene.

== Synthesis and properties ==
Neptunocene was first synthesised in 1970 by reacting neptunium(IV) chloride (NpCl_{4}) with dipotassium cyclooctatetraenide (K_{2}(C_{8}H_{8})) in diethyl ether or THF:

NpCl_{4} + 2 K_{2}(C_{8}H_{8}) → Np(C_{8}H_{8})_{2} + 4 KCl

The same reaction conditions have been routinely reproduced since then for the synthesis of the compound.

The three actinocenes uranocene, neptunocene, and plutonocene share virtually identical chemistry: they do not react in the presence of water or dilute base, but are very air-sensitive, quickly forming oxides. All three are only slightly soluble (up to about 10^{−3} M concentrations) in aromatic or chlorinated solvents such as benzene, toluene, carbon tetrachloride or chloroform.
