= Tetrakis(cyclopentadienyl)uranium(IV) =

Chemical compound

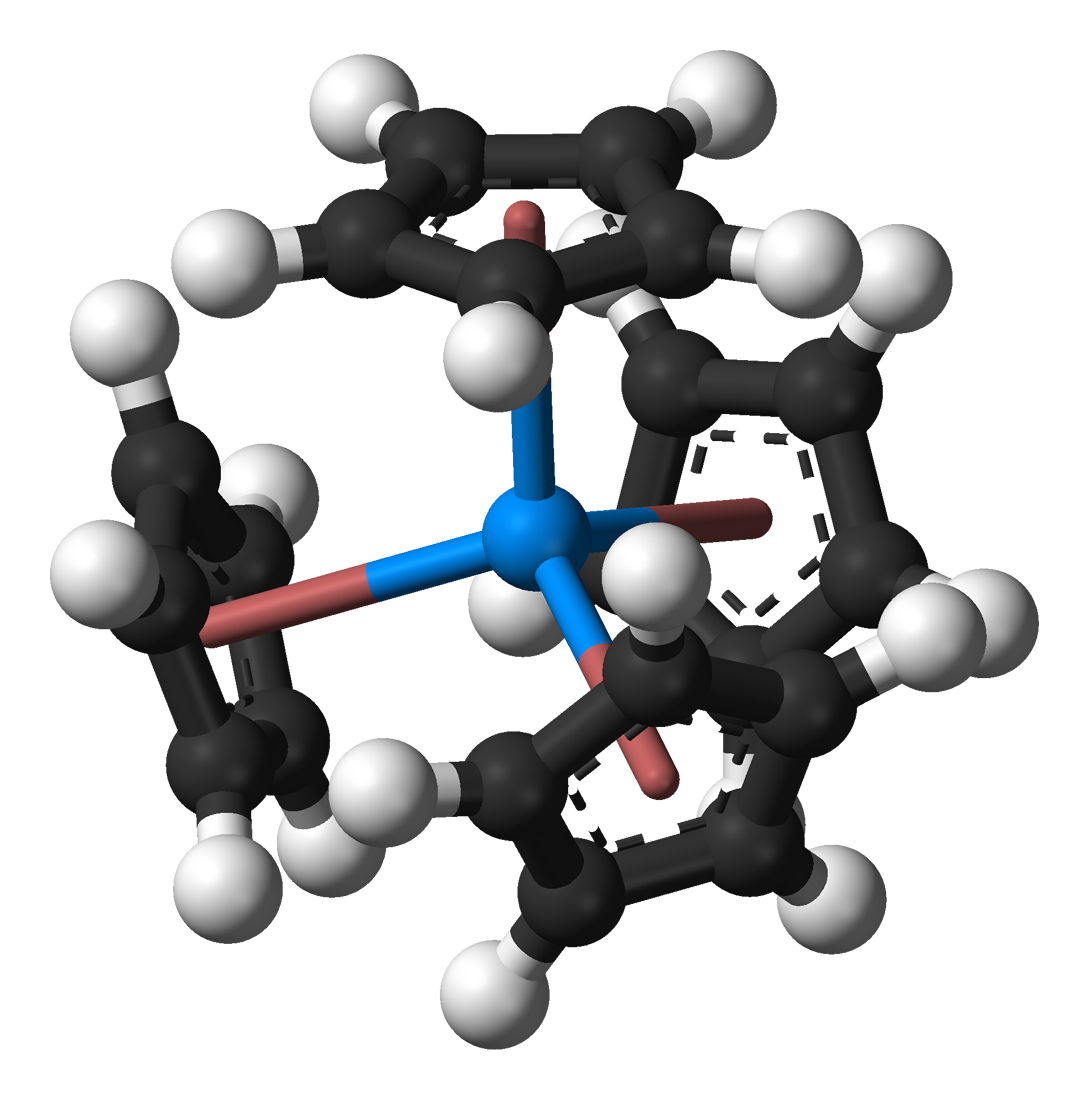

Names
- IUPAC name Tetrakis(η^{5}-cyclopentadienyl)uranium(IV)
- Other names Tetracyclopentadienyluranium; U(Cp)_{4}

Identifiers
CAS Number	1298-76-6
3D model (JSmol)	Interactive image
ChemSpider	67033592
PubChem CID	129665404
- InChI: InChI=1S/4C5H5.U/c4*1-2-4-5-3-1;/h4*1-5H;/q4*-1;+4 Key: OQDGQBKHUMGQKF-UHFFFAOYSA-N
- SMILES: [CH-]1C=CC=C1.[CH-]1C=CC=C1.[CH-]1C=CC=C1.[CH-]1C=CC=C1.[U+4]

Properties
Chemical formula	C_{20}H_{20}U
Appearance	red crystals
- Except where otherwise noted, data are given for materials in their standard state (at 25 °C [77 °F], 100 kPa). (what is ?) Infobox references

Tetrakis(cyclopentadienyl)uranium(IV), U(C_{5}H_{5})_{4}, abbreviated U(Cp)_{4}, is an organouranium compound composed of a uranium atom sandwiched between four cyclopentadienide rings.

== Synthesis and properties ==
Tetrakis(cyclopentadienyl)uranium(IV) was first prepared in 1962 by Ernst Otto Fischer, who reacted uranium tetrachloride with excess potassium cyclopentadienide in benzene and obtained the complex as red crystals at 6% yield:

UCl_{4} + 4 KCp → U(Cp)_{4} + 4 KCl

Solid crystals of U(Cp)_{4} are air-stable, but the benzene solution is extremely air-sensitive.

Reduction of U(Cp)_{4} with uranium metal yields tris(cyclopentadienyl)uranium(III), U(Cp)_{3}.
