= Organouranium chemistry =

Area of chemistry

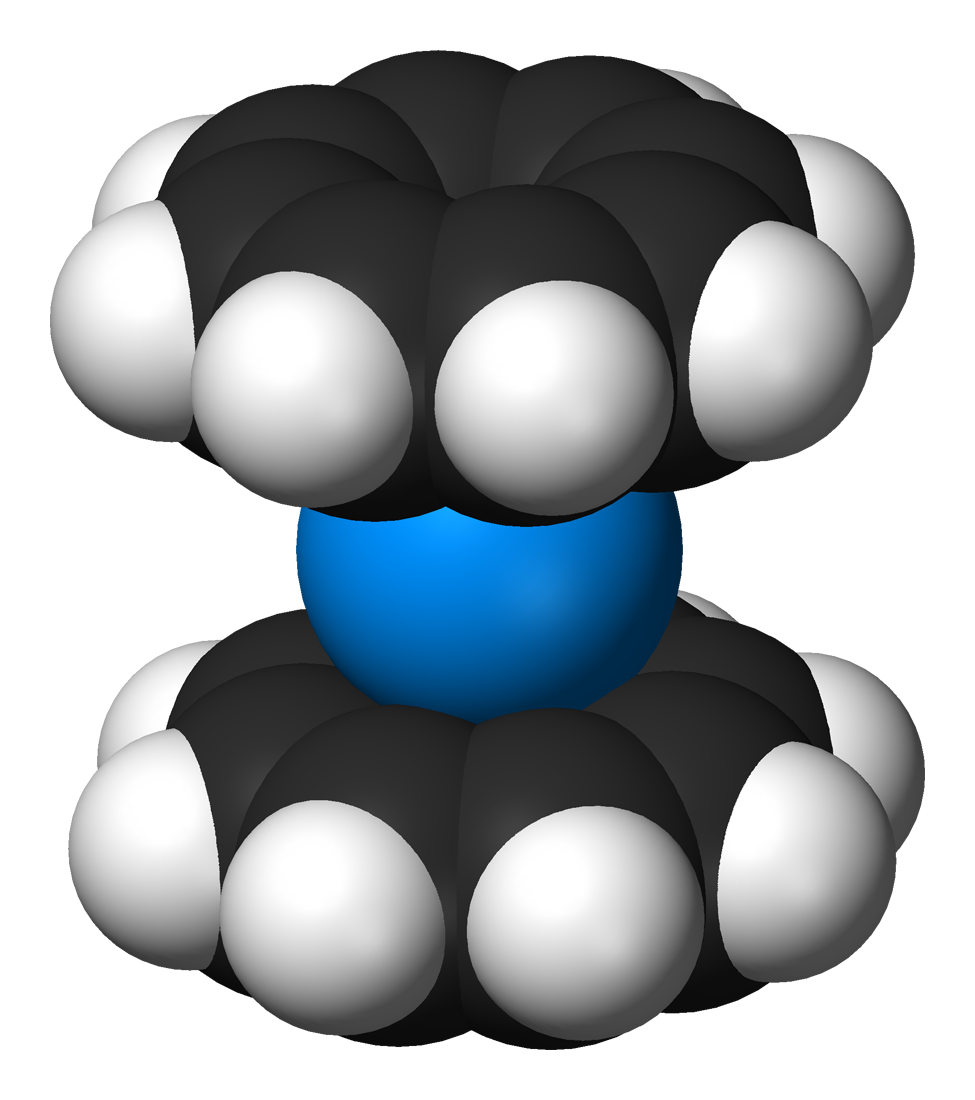
[Structure of bis(cyclooctatetraenyl)uranium "Uranocene"

Organouranium chemistry is the science exploring the properties, structure, and reactivity of organouranium compounds, which are organometallic compounds containing a carbon to uranium chemical bond. The field is of theoretical interest in organometallic chemistry.

== History ==
Organouranium compounds was investigated during World War II when the Manhattan Project required volatile uranium compounds for ^{235}U/^{238}U isotope separation. Henry Gilman attempted to synthesize compounds like tetramethyluranium, and others worked on uranium CO complexes. These efforts were fruitless, but investigations 60 years later have defined this class of compounds (see below). After the discovery of ferrocene, research teams led by future Nobelists Geoffrey Wilkinson and Ernst Otto Fischer reported the metallocenes Cp_{3}UCl and tetracyclopentadienyluranium Cp_{4}U. The scope of the area expanded with the synthesis of uranocene (COT)_{2}U, in which uranium(IV) is sandwiched between two planar cyclooctatetraenide (COT) ligands.

== Classes of compounds ==
=== Cyclopentadienyl complexes ===
The early work on Cp_{3}UCl and Cp_{4}U greatly expanded with the use of bulky Cp ligands. Illustrative are U(C_{5}H_{3}(SiMe_{3})_{2})_{3} and U(C_{5}Me_{5})_{3} (Me = CH_{3}). The complex U(C_{5}Me_{5})_{3} has an extensive chemistry, e.g. forming a adduct with N_{2}.

=== COT and related carbocycles ===
The easy 1-electron reduction of U(IV) compounds led to the half-sandwich compound (COT)U(BH_{4})_{2} discovered in 1983 by the group of Ephritikhine. Compounds of this type react in many ways, for instance alkylation at uranium with organolithium reagents or conversion to hybrid sandwich compounds. Other organouranium compounds are inverted uranocenes with a COT ligand in between two uranium atoms or uranium sandwich compounds with pentalenide ligands instead of COT ligands.

Uranium forms arene complexes, but their stoichiometries are not simple as in the transition metal derivatives. An early example is the "inverted" arene complex [U(R(Ar)N)_{2}}_{2}]_{2}(µ−C_{6}H_{5}CH_{3} (R, Ar = bulky alkyl and aryl groups) wherein the toluene ligand bridges the two uranium centers. This precedent spawned other more complicated uranium arene complexes.

=== Alkyl and aryl complexes ===
A number of anionic uranium(IV) and uranium(V) alkyl and aryl complexes have been characterized as lithium salts. In these salts, the lithium ion is bonded to ether or tertiary amines. The permethyl complexes include [UMe_{6}]^{2−}, [UMe_{7}]^{3–}, and [U_{2}Me_{10}]^{2–}. Related complexes feature bulkier alkyl ligands: [UR_{8}]^{3–}, with R = Me, CH_{2}SiMe_{3}, and CH_{2}^{t}Bu. The hexaphenyl [U(C_{6}H_{5})_{6}]^{2−} and charge-neutral tetrabenzyl U(CH_{2}C_{6}H_{5})_{4} further illustrate the diversity of this class of organouranium complexes.

=== NHC ligands ===
NHC ligands have also been installed on uranium. Examples include adducts of the uranyl, UO_{2}X_{2}(NHC)_{2} (X = halide, amide).

== See also ==
- Organoactinide chemistry
- A 1982 review of the organouranium and organothorium chemistry
