= Alfred Hassner =

Israeli organic chemist (1930–2024)

- אלפרד הסנר
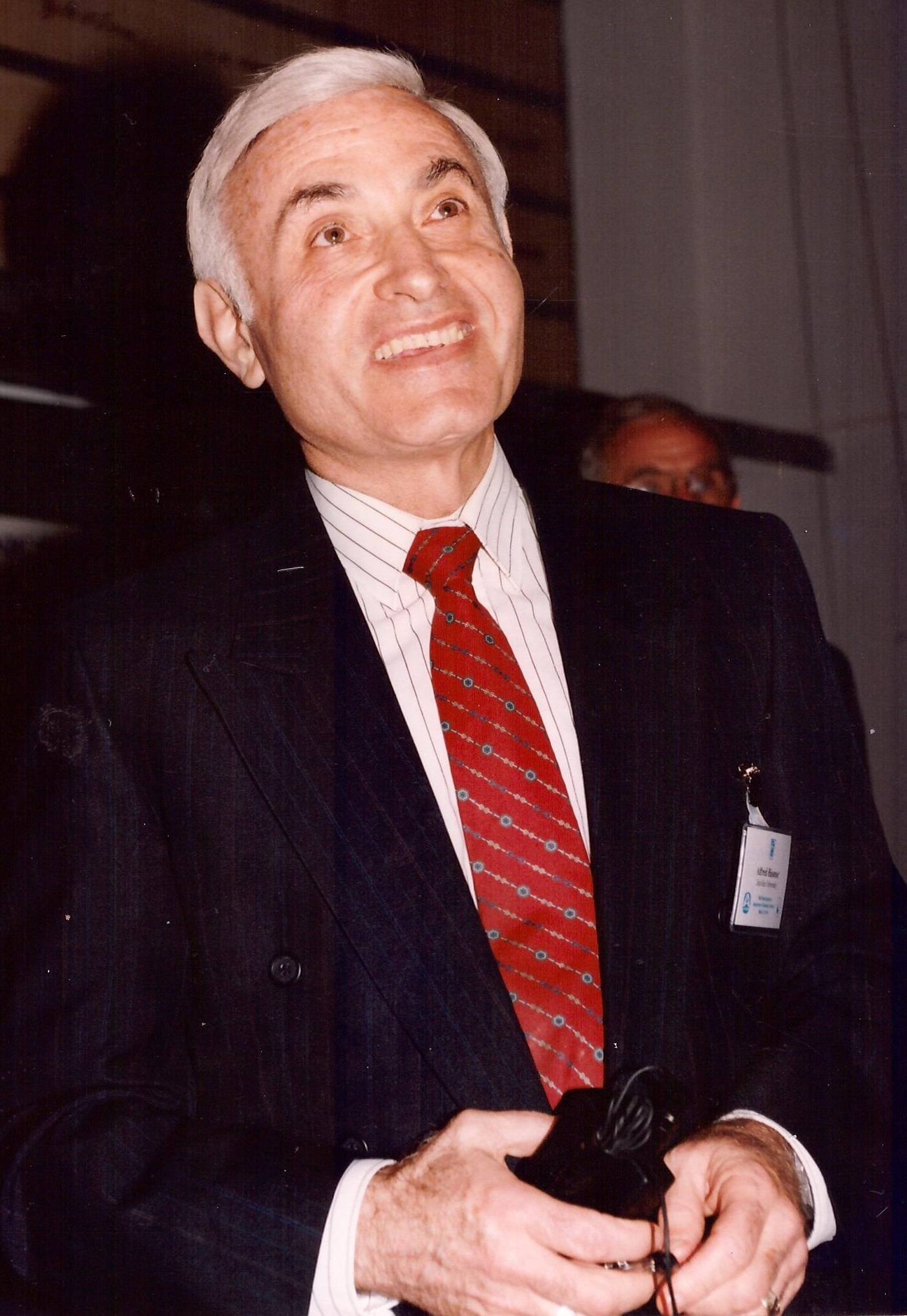
- Born: 11 November 1930; Cernăuți, Romania (now Chernivtsi, Ukraine)
- Died: 27 March 2024 (aged 93); Israel
- Citizenship: Israel
- Education: Vienna University of Technology; University of Nebraska–Lincoln
- Known for: Small-ring heterocycles; Organic synthesis methodology
- Scientific career
- Fields: Synthetic organic chemistry, Heterocycles
- Workplaces: Bar Ilan University
- Doctoral advisor: Norman H. Cromwell
- Other academic advisors: Louis F. Fieser
- Doctoral students: Clayton Heathcock

Alfred Hassner (Hebrew: אלפרד הסנר; 11 November 1930 – 27 March 2024) was an Israeli organic chemist.

== Biography ==
Alfred Hassner was born in Cernăuți and spent World War II in hiding while he lost his father; after the war, he returned to study in Vienna and then immigrated to the USA where he continued his studies. In 1983 he moved with his wife Cyd and two children to Israel. Hassner was recently Emeritus Professor at Bar Ilan University. He died on 27 March 2024, at the age of 93.

== Scientific career ==
After a postdoctoral at Harvard University, Hassner joined the University of Colorado Boulder in 1957 where he became a full professor in 1966. In 1975 he was called to State University of New York Binghamton as Leading Professor and in 1983 he moved to Bar Ilan University in Israel. Hassner was visiting professor at the University of Würzburg, Stanford University, the Weizmann Institute of Science, the University of California Berkeley, the University of Nijmegen, the Claude Bernard University Lyon 1, the Indian Institute of Science Bangalore and the Kyushu Institute of Technology.

=== Research ===
Hassner’s research group has studied: Regioselective additions of pseudohalogens; Stereochemistry of reactions of azides and organic nitrogen functions; Development of catalysts like DMAP for direct esterification of hindered alcohols; Regiochemistry of 3+2 cycloadditions and of 2+2 ketene olefin cycloadditions; Reaction of 3-member-ring iodonium ions and of nitrilium ion intermediates; Reactions of steroids; Organosilanes, Photochemical protection, Medicinal chemistry, electrophilic amination. Hassner’s group pioneered in methodology for synthesis of small ring heterocycles such as aziridines, azirines, azetines, as well as of larger ring heterocycles including azepines. Recently they studied TiCl$_4$ catalyzed reactions.

== Awards ==
Hassner was the recipient of several awards and honors: von Humboldt Fellow; Lady Davis Fellow; National Cancer Institute Senior Fellow; Killam Award; Fulbright Fellow; Meyerhoff Fellow; Fellow Royal Society of Chemistry; Israel Chemical Society Prize of Excellence. Hassner served on the editorial board of J. Org. Chem.; Org. Prep. Proced. International; Heterocyclic Commun.; Trends in Org. Chem. and was elected president of the Israel Chemical Society.

== Publications ==
Hassner is the author of 320 scientific publications; he was the editor of the scientific series: Advances in Asymmetric Synthesis (JAI press); Small Ring Heterocycles (Wiley); Topics in Heterocyclic Chemistry (Springer).

== Books ==
- Hassner, Namboothiri (2012). Organic Syntheses Based on Name Reactions, a practical guide to 750 transformations. Elsevier; 3 edition (5 January 2012). ISBN 978-0080966304.
