= Clayton Heathcock =

Chemist

Clayton Howell Heathcock
- Born: 21 July 1936 (age 90)
- Education: Abilene Christian University, University of Colorado (PhD 1963), Columbia University
- Known for: Synthesis of complex polycyclic natural products, Introduction to Organic Chemistry
- Awards: Ernest Guenther Award, Prelog Medal (ETH), Centenary Medal (Royal Society of Chemistry)
- Scientific career
- Fields: Organic chemistry
- Workplaces: University of California Berkeley
- Doctoral advisor: Alfred Hassner
- Other academic advisors: Gilbert Stork

Clayton Howell Heathcock (born July 21, 1936) is an American organic chemist, professor emeritus of chemistry, and former dean of the College of Chemistry at the University of California, Berkeley. He is known for total syntheses of complex polycyclic natural products and was elected to the National Academy of Sciences in 1995 and the American Academy of Arts and Sciences in 1991.

== Early life and education ==
Heathcock graduated from Brackenridge High School in San Antonio in 1954, earned a B.S. in chemistry from Abilene Christian College in 1958, and received a Ph.D. in organic chemistry from the University of Colorado Boulder in 1963 under Alfred Hassner. He completed a postdoctoral fellowship with Gilbert Stork at Columbia University (1963–1964).

== Academic career ==
He joined the UC Berkeley faculty in 1964, rising to full professor by 1975. He chaired the Department of Chemistry (1986–1989) and was named dean of the College of Chemistry in 1999, succeeding Alexis T. Bell. He held the Gilbert Newton Lewis Professorship (2003–2005) and served as chief scientist of the California Institute for Quantitative Biosciences (QB3) from 2005 until his retirement in 2008. He also chaired the Organic Chemistry Division of the American Chemical Society and was editor-in-chief of Organic Syntheses and the Journal of Organic Chemistry.

== Research ==
Heathcock's research focused on total synthesis of complex polycyclic natural products, including the Daphniphyllum alkaloids, altohyrtin, and the spongistatins, and on new stereoselective methods, with particular attention to the aldol condensation. In 1977 and 1978 he and students Charles Buse and William Kleschick demonstrated that by using preformed lithium enolates the stereochemical outcome of the addition to aldehydes can be predicted using a mechanistic rationale for the reaction that was first introduced by Howard Zimmerman and Margaret Traxler, the so-called Zimmerman–Traxler Transition State. This established the aldol addition reaction as a general method for stereocontrolled synthesis. In all, Heathcock published roughly 285 papers. With Andrew Streitwieser, he coauthored the textbook Introduction to Organic Chemistry (1976), which eventually appeared in three subsequent editions and was translated into multiple languages other than English.

== Awards and honors ==
His honors include the Ernest Guenther Award (ACS, 1986), the ACS Award for Creative Work in Synthetic Organic Chemistry (1990), the Prelog Medal (ETH Zurich, 1991), election to the American Academy of Arts and Sciences (1991), election to the National Academy of Sciences (1995), the Centenary Medal of the Royal Society of Chemistry (1996), the Herbert C. Brown Award for Creative Research in Synthetic Methods (2002), and the Paul Gassman Award for Distinguished Service (2004).

== Heathcock Hall ==
In October 2019, UC Berkeley alumnus Terry Rosen, a former doctoral student of Heathcock's, and his wife, Tori, donated $25 million toward a new College of Chemistry building to be named Heathcock Hall in his honor. Ground was broken in summer 2024 on the four-story facility. In 2025, Heathcock was interviewed for UC Berkeley's Emeriti Legacy Project.
