= Uranocene =

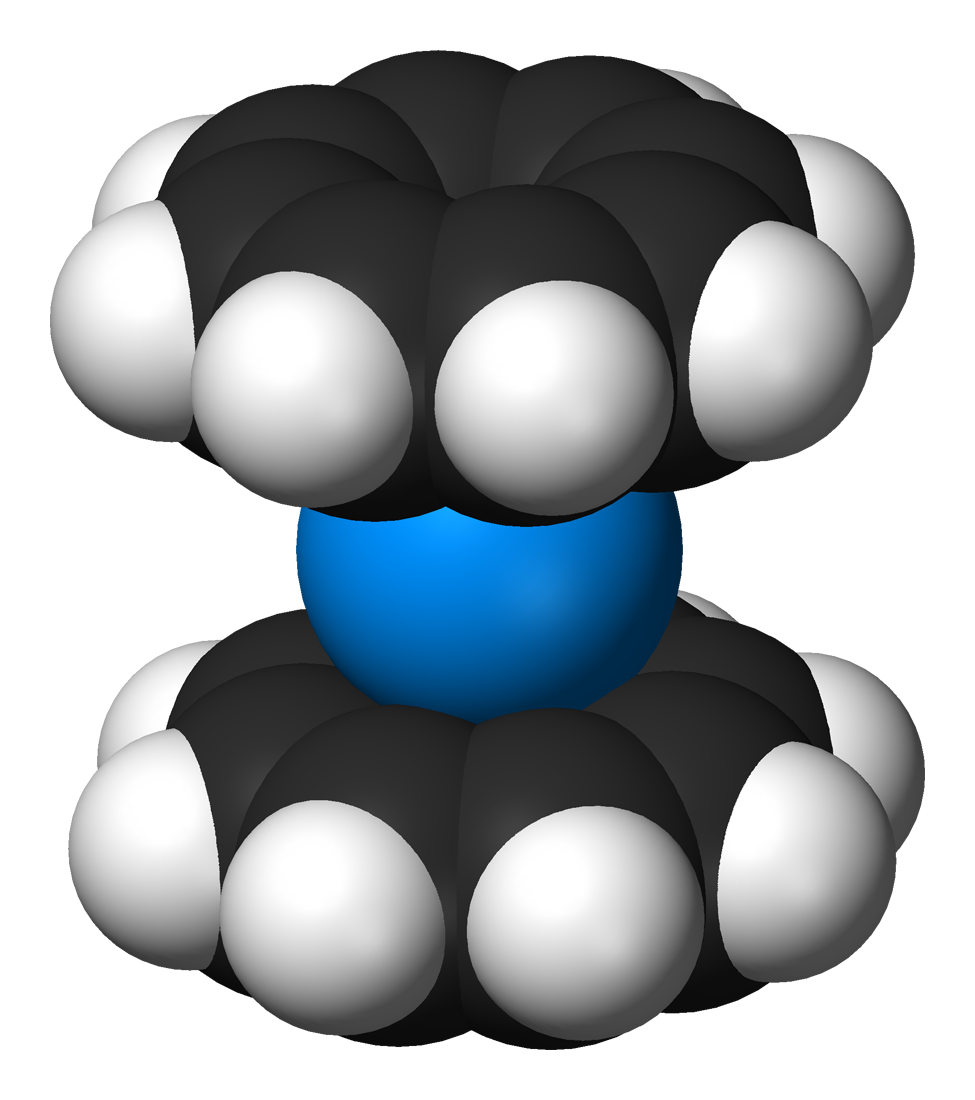

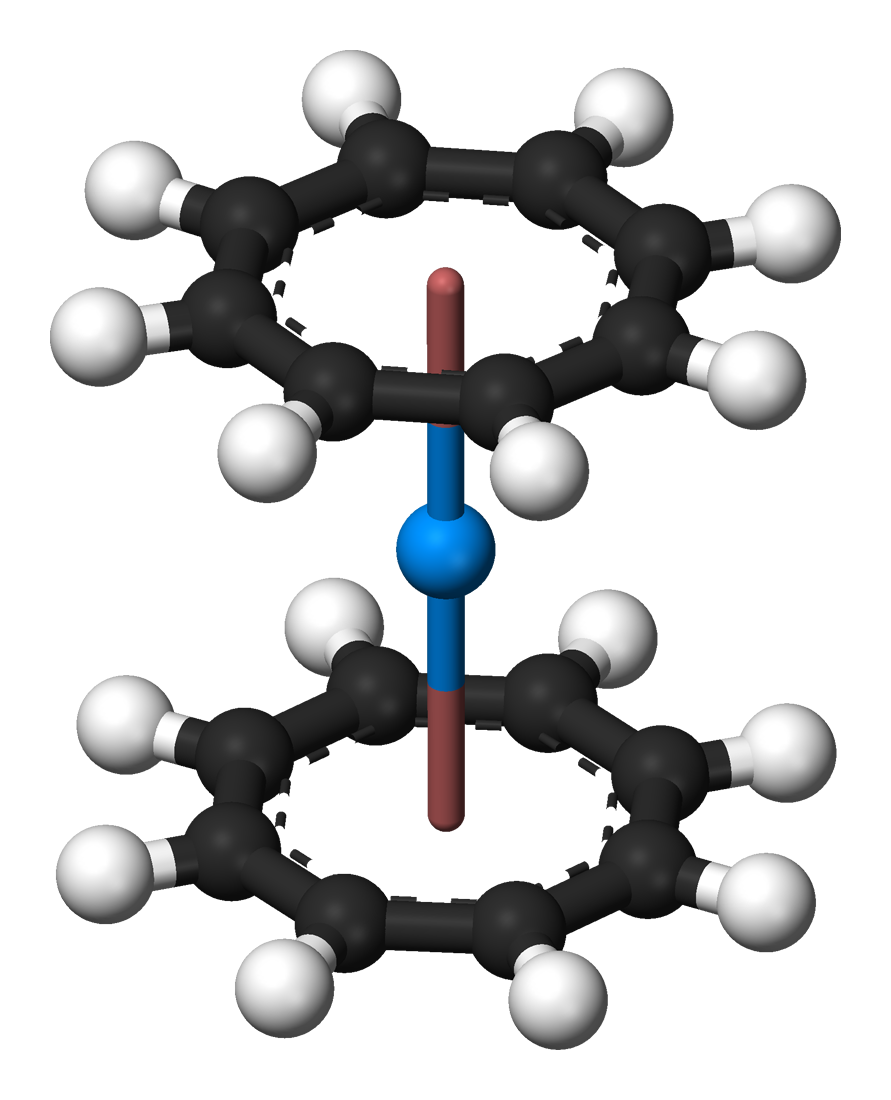

Names
- IUPAC name Bis(η^{8}-cyclooctatetraene)uranium
- Other names Uranium cyclooctatetraenide U(COT)_{2}

Identifiers
CAS Number	11079-26-8
3D model (JSmol)	Interactive image
ChemSpider	57575622
PubChem CID	12865934
CompTox Dashboard (EPA)	DTXSID40911863
- InChI: InChI=1S/2C8H8.U/c2*1-2-4-6-8-7-5-3-1;/h2*1-8H;/q2*-2;/b2*2-1-,5-3-,8-6-; Key: RHDYKSUWBHNFEJ-GIKYMASMSA-N; InChI=1/2C8H8.U/c2*1-2-4-6-8-7-5-3-1;/h2*1-8H;/q2*-2;/b2*2-1-,5-3-,8-6-; Key: RHDYKSUWBHNFEJ-GIKYMASMBM
- SMILES: C1=CC=CC=CC=C1.C1=CC=CC=CC=C1.[U]

Properties
Chemical formula	C_{16}H_{16}U
Molar mass	446.33 g/mol
Appearance	green crystals

Hazards
- Occupational safety and health (OHS/OSH)
Main hazards	pyrophoric, radioactive, and toxic
- Except where otherwise noted, data are given for materials in their standard state (at 25 °C [77 °F], 100 kPa). verify (what is ?) Infobox references

Uranocene, U(C_{8}H_{8})_{2}, is an organouranium compound composed of a uranium atom sandwiched between two cyclooctatetraenide rings. It was one of the first organoactinide compounds to be synthesized. It is a green air-sensitive solid that dissolves in organic solvents. Uranocene, a member of the "actinocenes," a group of metallocenes incorporating elements from the actinide series. It is the most studied bis[8]annulene-metal system, although it has no known practical applications.

== Synthesis, structure and bonding ==
Uranocene was first described in 1968 by the group of Andrew Streitwieser, when it was prepared by the reaction of dipotassium cyclooctatetraenide and uranium tetrachloride in THF at 0°C:

Uranocene is highly reactive toward oxygen, being pyrophoric in air but stable to hydrolysis. The x-ray crystal structure of uranocene was first elucidated by the group of Ken Raymond. Considering the molecule to be U^{4+}(C_{8}H_{8}^{2−})_{2}, the η^{8}-cyclooctatetraenide groups are planar, as expected for a ring containing 10 π-electrons, and are mutually parallel, forming a sandwich containing the uranium atom. In the solid state, the rings are eclipsed, conferring D_{8h} symmetry on the molecule. In solution the rings rotate with a low activation energy.

The uranium-cyclooctatetraenyl bonding was shown by photoelectron spectroscopy to be primarily due to mixing of uranium 6d orbitals into ligand pi orbitals and therefore donation of electronic charge to the uranium, with a smaller such interaction involving the uranium (5f)^{2} orbitals. Electronic theory calculations agree with this result and point out that the weaker interaction of the open-shell 5f orbitals with the ligand orbitals determines |M_{J}|, the magnitude of the angular momentum quantum number along the 8-fold symmetry axis of the ground state.

=== Spectroscopic properties ===
Uranocene is paramagnetic. Its magnetic susceptibility is consistent with values of 3 or 4 for |M_{J}|, with the accompanying magnetic moment being affected by the spin-orbit coupling. Its NMR spectrum is consistent with an |M_{J}| value of 3. Electronic theory calculations from the simplest to the most accurate also give |M_{J}| values of 3 for the ground state and 2 for the first excited state, corresponding to double-group symmetry designations of E_{3g} and E_{2g} for these states.

The green color of uranocene is due to three strong transitions in its visible spectrum. In addition to finding vibrational frequencies, Raman spectra indicate the presence of a low-lying (E_{2g}) excited electronic state. On the basis of calculations, the visible transitions are assigned to transitions primarily of 5f-to-6d nature, giving rise to E_{2u} and E_{3u} states.

== Analogous compounds ==
Analogous compounds of the form M(C_{8}H_{8})_{2} exist for M = (Nd, Tb, Yb, Th, Pa, Np, and Pu). Extensions include the air-stable derivative U(C_{8}H_{4}Ph_{4})_{2} and the cycloheptatrienyl species [U(C_{7}H_{7})_{2}]^{−}. In contrast, bis(cyclooctatetraene)iron has a very different structure, with one each of a η^{6}- and η^{4}-C_{8}H_{8} ligands.
