= Andrew Streitwieser =

American chemist (1927–2022)

- Born: 1927; Buffalo, New York
- Died: February 23, 2022 (aged 94–95)
- Citizenship: U.S.
- Education: Columbia College, B.S. Columbia University, Ph.D. MIT, Post Doc.
- Children: 2
- Scientific career
- Workplaces: University of California, Berkeley
- Doctoral advisor: William von Eggers Doering
- Other academic advisors: John D. Roberts
- Doctoral students: Peter J. Stang

Andrew Streitwieser was an American chemist known for his contributions to physical organic chemistry.

Streitwieser was born in 1927 in Buffalo, New York and he grew up in New York City. He attended Columbia College and then Columbia University where he earned a PhD in the research group of William von Eggers Doering in 1952. He then was a postdoctoral fellow in the laboratory of John D. Roberts at MIT. He has been Professor of Chemistry at the University of California, Berkeley since 1953.

Streitwieser was one of the pioneers of molecular orbital theory and his book Molecular Orbital Theory for Organic Chemists had a lasting impact on the field. He is also well-known for proposing the currently accepted interpretation of the origin of secondary deuterium kinetic isotope effects. Streitwieser developed the technique of using protium/deuterium exchange to measure the acidity of exceedingly weak carbon acids and was a codeveloper of the MSAD acidity scale, named for the first initials of the chemists who developed it. His Chemical Reviews article titled "Solvolytic Displacement Reactions at Saturated Carbon" was influential in the field of physical organic chemistry. Streitwieser is also the author of the widely used university textbook Introduction to Organic Chemistry (4th revised ed., 1998, with Heathcock and Kosower, ISBN 0139738509, German translation, Organische Chemie, ISBN 3527258108), as well as the autobiography A Lifetime of Synergy With Theory and Experiment (ISBN 0841218366).

Streitwieser was elected to the United States National Academy of Sciences in 1969 and was an American Chemical Society Fellow. He is the recipient of the ACS Award in Petroleum Chemistry (1967), James Flack Norris Award in Physical Organic Chemistry (1982), the Guggenheim Fellowship (1968), the Arthur C. Cope Scholar Award (1989), and the Roger Adams Award (2009).
