= Cyclooctatetraenide anion =

Ion

Names
- Preferred IUPAC name Cyclooctatetraenediide

Identifiers
CAS Number	34510-09-3
3D model (JSmol)	Interactive image
- InChI: InChI=1S/C8H8/c1-2-4-6-8-7-5-3-1/h1-8H/q-2 Key: GSYKYIXVPVFJRF-UHFFFAOYSA-N
- SMILES: c1=c[cH-]c=c[cH-]c=c1

Properties
Chemical formula	C_{8}H_{8}^{2−}
Molar mass	104.15 g/mol
- Except where otherwise noted, data are given for materials in their standard state (at 25 °C [77 °F], 100 kPa). Infobox references

In chemistry, the cyclooctatetraenide anion or cyclooctatetraenide, more precisely cyclooctatetraenediide, is an aromatic species with a formula of [C_{8}H_{8}]^{2−} and abbreviated as COT^{2−}. It is the dianion of cyclooctatetraene. Salts of the cyclooctatetraenide anion can be stable, e.g., dipotassium cyclooctatetraenide or disodium cyclooctatetraenide. More complex coordination compounds are known as cyclooctatetraenide complexes, such as the actinocenes.

The structure is a planar symmetric octagon stabilized by resonance, meaning each atom bears a charge of −1/4. The length of the bond between carbon atoms is 1.432 Å. There are 10 π electrons. The structure can serve as a ligand with various metals.

== List of salts ==
name	formula	CAS	remarks	references
Samarium(II) cyclooctatetraenide	Sm(C_{8}H_{8})			
Dipotassium samarium(II) cyclooctatetraenide	K_{2}Sm(C_{8}H_{8})_{2}			
Neodymium cyclooctatetraenide	Nd(C_{8}H_{8})_{2}			
Terbium cyclooctatetraenide	Tb(C_{8}H_{8})_{2}			
Protactinocene	(Pa(C_{8}H_{8})_{2})	51056-18-9		
Thorocene	(Th(C_{8}H_{8})_{2})	12702-09-9		
Uranocene	U(C_{8}H_{8})_{2}	11079-26-8	green	
Neptunocene	(Np(C_{8}H_{8})_{2})	154974-81-9	dark brown	
Plutonocene	(Pu(C_{8}H_{8})_{2})	37281-23-5	red	
Cerocene	Ce^{3+}(C_{8}H_{8}^{1.5-})_{2}	37205-27-9		

== See also ==
- Tropylium ion
- Cyclopentadienyl anion
