= Bimane =

Names
- Preferred IUPAC name 1H,7H-Pyrazolo[1,2-a]pyrazole-1,7-dione

Identifiers
CAS Number	79769-56-5
3D model (JSmol)	Interactive image
ChemSpider	26286941
PubChem CID	13017386
UNII	M4U7HN57SZ
CompTox Dashboard (EPA)	DTXSID30515298
- InChI: InChI=1S/C6H4N2O2/c9-5-1-3-7-4-2-6(10)8(5)7/h1-4H Key: DOYVLWSSQKOKHQ-UHFFFAOYSA-N; InChI=1/C6H4N2O2/c9-5-1-3-7-4-2-6(10)8(5)7/h1-4H Key: DOYVLWSSQKOKHQ-UHFFFAOYAT
- SMILES: O=C1C=CN2N1C(C=C2)=O

Properties
Chemical formula	C_{6}H_{4}N_{2}O_{2}
Molar mass	136.110 g·mol^{−1}
- Except where otherwise noted, data are given for materials in their standard state (at 25 °C [77 °F], 100 kPa). verify (what is ?) Infobox references

Bimane is a heterocyclic chemical compound. Bimane forms the core of a class of fluorescent dyes known as bimane dyes.
