= Dipotassium cyclooctatetraenide =

Names
- Preferred IUPAC name Dipotassium cycloocatetraenediide

Identifiers
CAS Number	59391-85-4
3D model (JSmol)	Interactive image
ChemSpider	57575621
PubChem CID	12716830
- InChI: InChI=1S/C8H8.2K/c1-2-4-6-8-7-5-3-1;;/h1-8H;;/q-2;2*+1/b2-1-,5-3-,8-6-;; Key: JEUFATMWOKTCQC-YGFQESQOSA-N; InChI=1/C8H8.2K/c1-2-4-6-8-7-5-3-1;;/h1-8H;;/q-2;2*+1/b2-1-,5-3-,8-6-;; Key: JEUFATMWOKTCQC-YGFQESQOBL
- SMILES: [K+].c1=c[cH-]c=c[cH-]c=c1.[K+]

Properties
Chemical formula	C_{8}H_{8}K_{2}
Appearance	beige solid
- Except where otherwise noted, data are given for materials in their standard state (at 25 °C [77 °F], 100 kPa). Infobox references

Dipotassium cyclooctatetraenide, sometimes abbreviated K_{2}COT, is an organopotassium compound with the formula K_{2}C_{8}H_{8}. It is a brown solid that is used as a precursor to cyclooctatetraenide complexes, such as uranocene (U(C_{8}H_{8})_{2}). Analogs of K_{2}C_{8}H_{8} are known with ring substituents, with different alkali metals, and with various complexants.

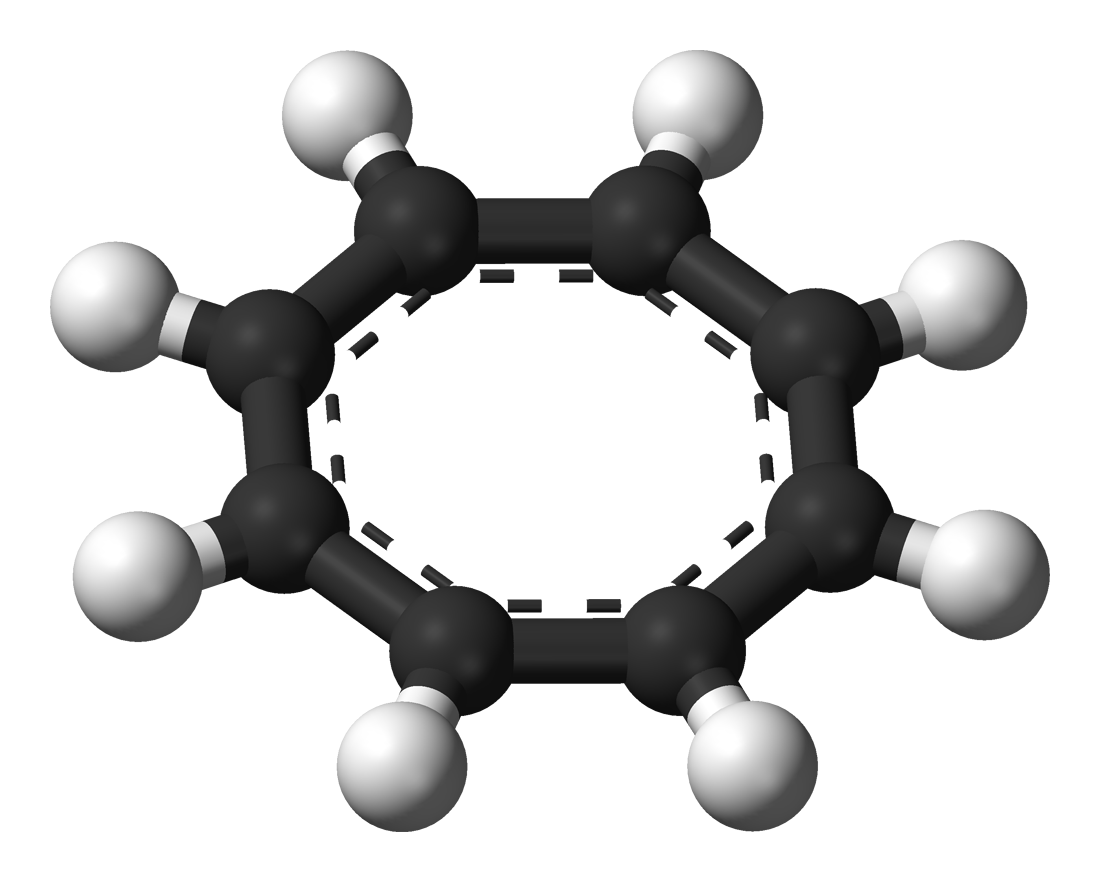
Ball-and-stick model of COT^{2−}

== Preparation and structure ==
Potassium cyclooctatetraenide is formed by the reaction of cyclooctatetraene with potassium metal:

2 K + C_{8}H_{8} → K_{2}C_{8}H_{8}

The reaction entails 2-electron reduction of the polyene and is accompanied by a color change from colorless to brown.

The structure of K_{2}(diglyme)C_{8}H_{8} has been characterized by X-ray crystallography of the derivatives with diglyme complexed to the potassium cations. The C_{8}H_{8} unit is planar with an average C-C distance of 1.40 A.
