= Hepatic arterial infusion =

- Specialty: Oncology

Hepatic arterial infusion (HAI) is a medical procedure that delivers chemotherapy directly to the liver. The procedure, mostly used in combination with systemic chemotherapy, plays a role in the treatment of liver metastases in patients with colorectal cancer (CRC). Although surgical resection remains the standard of care for these liver metastases, majority of patients have lesions that are unresectable.

The liver derives its blood supply from two sources – via the hepatic arterial circulation and the portal circulation. Liver metastases get most of their blood supply primarily from the hepatic artery, whereas the normal liver cells get their blood supply from the portal circulation. This allows for chemotherapeutic drugs to be delivered directly to the cancer cells if infused into the hepatic artery. Multiple trials have compared HAI (with various chemotherapeutic agents) to systemic chemotherapy. Compared to systemic Fluoropyrimidine, HAI with Floxuridine (FUDR) had an increased response, but there was no overall increase in patient survival. Efforts have been made to increase the efficacy and safety of HAI chemotherapy: when a combination of FUDR and dexamethasone was used for HAI, both response rate and median survival increased. In another study, a combination of FUDR and leucovorin for HAI increased the response rate, and reduced the biliary toxicity seen with the use of FUDR alone. Considering improvements in the surgical placement of the HAI pump and studies showing promising results when HAI therapy is used together with systemic oxaliplatin or irinotecan, there is once again an increased interest in the role of HAI as a treatment option in patients with cancer, who have unresectable CRC liver metastases. However, studies recommend that this treatment modality be restricted to centers with expertise in the surgical placement of these pumps, and the technical aspects of localized chemotherapy.

== Procedure ==
Before the placement of the HAI pump, the patients undergo an arteriogram to outline the blood supply of the liver and to identify any anatomical anomalies. The procedure begins with an exploratory laparotomy to confirm the unresectable nature of the tumor, and then the gallbladder is removed by performing a cholecystectomy. This is done to prevent treatment induced cholecystitis. The distal gastroduodenal artery, the right gastric artery, and small branches supplying the stomach and duodenum are ligated. This total devascularization of the distal stomach and proximal duodenum minimizes the risk of any extra hepatic perfusion. The catheter is placed at the junction of the proper and common hepatic arteries, and threaded through the gastroduodenal (mostly), or celiac artery. The catheter is fixed in this position and the pump is placed in a subcutaneous pocket. Finally, to confirm adequate placement and hepatic perfusion, and to rule out extrahepatic perfusion, a dye (fluorescein or methylene blue) is injected into the pump. After the procedure and before starting the HAI based treatment, a technetium 99m-labeled macroaggregated albumin scan is performed to again confirm adequate hepatic perfusion and no misperfusion outside of the liver.

== Complications ==
The complications of HAI therapy can be divided into those related to the surgical placement of the pump, technical catheter-related complications, and those related to the chemotherapeutic agents used.

Relating to the surgical HAI pump placement, early postoperative complications consist of arterial injury leading to hepatic artery thrombosis, inadequate perfusion of the entire liver due to the inability to identify an accessory hepatic artery, extrahepatic perfusion to the stomach or duodenum, or hematoma formation in the subcutaneous pump pocket. Late complications are more common and include inflammation or ulceration of the stomach or duodenum, and pump pocket infection.

The most common catheter related complications include displacement of the catheter, occlusion of the hepatic artery because of the catheter, and catheter thrombosis. These catheter related complications don't occur as frequently with increased surgical experience and with improvements in pump design.

The most common toxicities caused by the chemotherapeutic agents were gastrointestinal symptoms, chemical hepatitis, and bone marrow inhibition. The most serious and dose limiting complication of HAI is hepatobiliary toxicity. This occurs more commonly with FUDR than any other chemotherapeutic agent. Patients undergoing HAI therapy therefore have regular liver function tests to monitor any damage to the liver. As previously mentioned, studies have been carried out to come up with treatment algorithms to minimize this serious side effect. It has been shown that adding leucovorin and FUDR for infusion through the pump not only reduces the biliary toxicity of the drug, but also increases the response rate. However, biliary sclerosis is not seen with HAI using 5-FU. 5-FU is associated with an increased risk of myelosuppression. Logically, it would make sense to therefore consider alternating between HAI FUDR and HAI 5-FU.
