= Monophosphate =

Monophosphate refers to any compound containing one phosphate unit.

== Nucleotides ==
- Adenosine monophosphate
- Nucleoside monophosphate
- Uridine monophosphate
- Cytidine monophosphate
- Thymidine monophosphate
- Guanosine monophosphate
- Thiamine monophosphate
- Deoxyadenosine monophosphate
- Deoxyuridine monophosphate
- Deoxycytidine monophosphate
- Deoxyguanosine monophosphate

== Other monophosphates ==
- Boron monophosphate
- Aluminium monophosphate
- Scandium monophosphate
- Chromium monophosphate
- Manganese monophosphate
- Iron monophosphate
- Gallium monophosphate
- Yttrium monophosphate
- Indium monophosphate
- Lanthanum monophosphate
- Cerium monophosphate
- Praseodymium monophosphate
- Neodymium monophosphate
- Promethium monophosphate
- Samarium monophosphate
- Europium monophosphate
- Gadolinium monophosphate
- Terbium monophosphate
- Dysprosium monophosphate
- Holmium monophosphate
- Erbium monophosphate
- Thulium monophosphate
- Ytterbium monophosphate
- Lutetium monophosphate
- Gold monophosphate
- Bismuth monophosphate
- Actinium monophosphate
