= Neptunyl(V) oxalate =

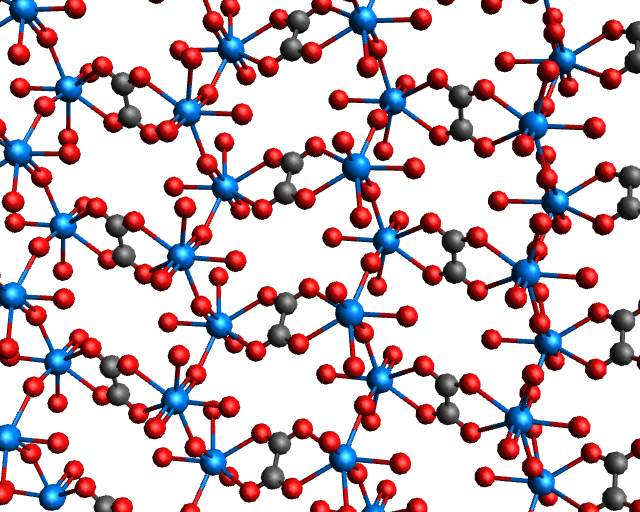

Names
- IUPAC name Dioxoneptunium(V) oxalate

Identifiers
3D model (JSmol)	Interactive image
- InChI: InChI=1S/C2H2O4.2Np.4O/c3-1(4)2(5)6;;;;;;/h(H,3,4)(H,5,6);;;;;;/q;2*+1;;;;/p-2 Key: ADWCQONTARWVKQ-UHFFFAOYSA-L
- SMILES: O=[Np+]=O.O=[Np+]=O.C(=O)(C(=O)[O-])[O-]

Properties
Chemical formula	(NpO_{2})_{2}C_{2}O_{4}
Molar mass	626 g·mol^{−1}
- Except where otherwise noted, data are given for materials in their standard state (at 25 °C [77 °F], 100 kPa). Infobox references

Neptunyl(V) oxalate, or neptunium(V) oxalate, is a compound consisting of neptunyl and oxalate ions with formula (NpO_{2})_{2}C_{2}O_{4}. It is known to form several hydrates with compositions (NpO_{2})_{2}C_{2}O_{4}·xH_{2}O, where x is between 4 and 6. It also forms several coordination complexes, such as Na_{2}NpO_{2}(C_{2}O_{4})OH·H_{2}O or Na_{4}(NpO_{2})_{2}(C_{2}O_{4})_{3}·6H_{2}O, which are sometimes referred to as neptunium(V) oxalates as well. Neptunyl(V) oxalate and its complexes have been investigated in the study of cation-cation interactions, a type of bonding that frequently occurs between neptunyl cations.

== Synthesis ==
A simple method for the preparation of neptunyl(V) oxalate is the reaction of neptunyl(V) nitrate (NpO_{2}NO_{3}) with either sodium oxalate (Na_{2}C_{2}O_{4}), potassium oxalate (K_{2}C_{2}O_{4}), or ammonium oxalate ((NH_{4})_{2}C_{2}O_{4}). When they react in stoichiometric quantities, neptunyl(V) oxalate hydrates are precipitated:

6 H_{2}O + 2 NpO_{2}NO_{3} + M_{2}C_{2}O_{4} → (NpO_{2})_{2}C_{2}O_{4}·6H_{2}O + 2 MNO_{3} (M=Na, K, NH_{4})

It is also formed when neptunyl(V) ions (NpO^{+}_{2}) interact with oxalopolyperoxouranylate nanoclusters at high neptunyl concentrations, and when neptunium(IV) oxalate decomposes in air.

== Properties ==
Neptunyl(V) oxalate forms several hydrates with composition (NpO_{2})_{2}C_{2}O_{4}·xH_{2}O, where x=4, 5, or 6. The compounds (NpO_{2})_{2}C_{2}O_{4}·4H_{2}O and (NpO_{2})_{2}C_{2}O_{4}·5H_{2}O have been studied for their magnetic properties. (NpO_{2})_{2}C_{2}O_{4}·5H_{2}O was determined to have a magnetic moment of 2.560 μ_{B} per neptunium atom as part of a broader study of neptunyl-containing compounds. (NpO_{2})_{2}C_{2}O_{4}·4H_{2}O has been found to undergo a metamagnetic transition at 11.6 K.

=== Structure ===
The structure of the hexahydrate, (NpO_{2})_{2}C_{2}O_{4}·6H_{2}O, has been characterized as part of the study of cation-cation interactions. In it, neptunyl ions are linked through these bonds to form zigzag chains, and are further linked into layers by bridging oxalate groups. Each neptunium atom in the neptunyl ions has a coordination geometry of pentagonal bipyramidal, and is bonded to two water molecules, two oxygen atoms from an oxalate group, and one oxygen atom from a neighboring neptunyl group. The oxalate groups are bidentate (bonding in two spots) to each bonding neptunyl atom, and bond with it side-on. Four water molecules lie between these layers per formula unit, and link these layers through hydrogen bonding.

This chain-like structure leads to (NpO_{2})_{2}C_{2}O_{4}·6H_{2}O's low solubility of 0.62 g/L.

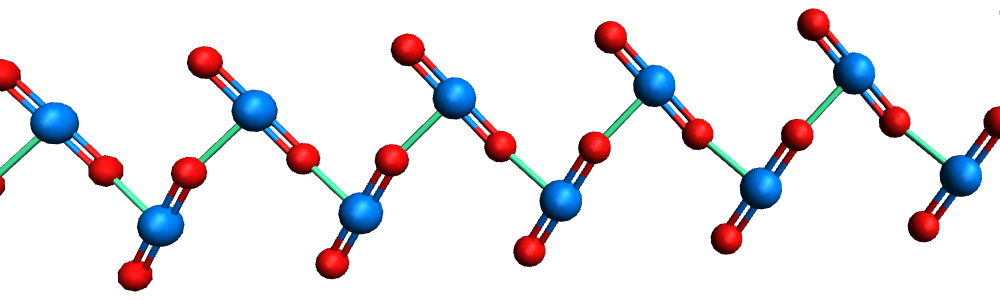
Chains of neptunyl ions in the structure of neptunyl(V) perchlorate tetrahydrate, NpO_{2}ClO_{4}·4H_{2}O, which are the same as in (NpO_{2})_{2}C_{2}O_{4}·6H_{2}O. Sea green bonds represent cation-cation interactions between neptunyl ions.

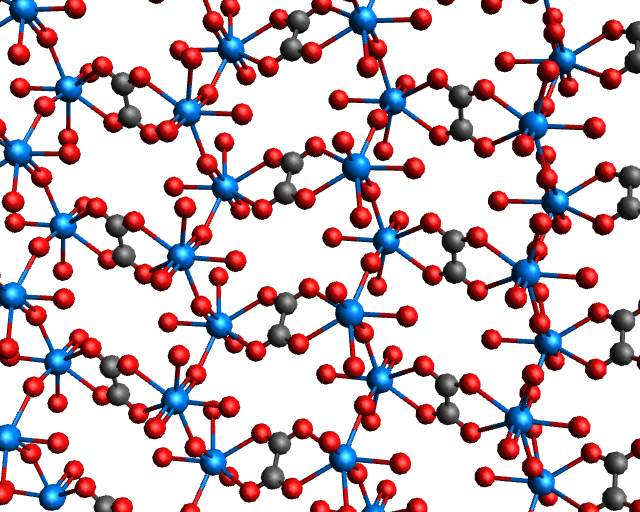
Single-layer structure of neptunyl(V) oxalate hexahydrate. Hydrogen atoms are omitted.

== Complexes ==
Neptunyl(V) oxalate is known to form a complex with imidazole, (NpO_{2})_{2}C_{2}O_{4}(Im)_{6}·5Im·H_{2}O (Im=imidazole), which was one of the first known examples of a compound where imidazole directly binds with an actinide atom. The (NpO_{2})_{2}C_{2}O_{4}(Im)_{6} complex is made up of two neptunyl groups bridged by an oxalate group which bonds with them side-on, as well as six imidazole groups, three bonding to each neptunium atom.

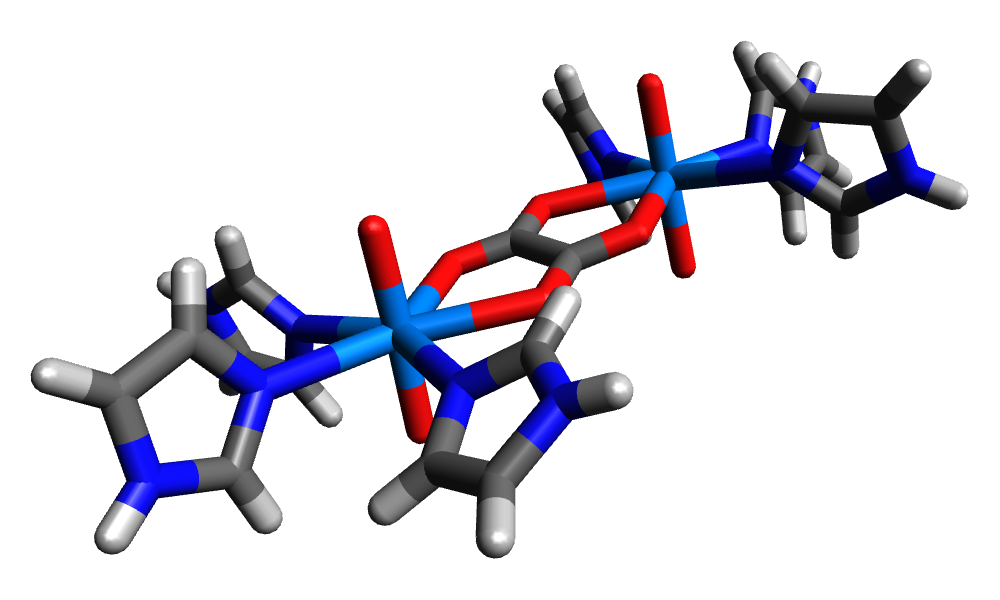
The structure of the (NpO_{2})_{2}C_{2}O_{4}(Im)_{6} (Im=imidazole) complex as found in (NpO_{2})_{2}C_{2}O_{4}(Im)_{6}·5Im·H_{2}O. Red represents oxygen, grey represents carbon, white represents hydrogen, dark blue represents nitrogen, and light blue represents neptunium.

Many monooxalate ([NpO_{2}]^{+}:[C_{2}O_{4}]^{2−} ratio = 1:1) complexes are known, with general formula MNpO_{2}C_{2}O_{4}·xH_{2}O (M=Na, K, Cs, NH_{4}, x=1–3). The compounds CsNpO_{2}C_{2}O_{4}·xH_{2}O and NH_{4}NpO_{2}C_{2}O_{4}·xH_{2}O adopt similar structures, both being made out of cyclic neptunyl trimers. In these trimers, neptunyl ions are linked through cation-cation interactions, with each donating one cation-cation interaction and accepting another. These trimers are linked to each other via oxalate groups, each neptunium atom bonding side-on with two oxalate groups, and each oxalate group bonding side-on with two neptunyl groups, creating a neptunyl oxalate framework. The sodium member of this series, NaNpO_{2}C_{2}O_{4}·3H_{2}O, adopts a different structure. Neptunium atoms have a coordination geometry of pentagonal bipyramidal, being coordinated to one water molecule and two bidentate (bonding in two spots) oxalate groups. Oxalate groups connect neptunyl groups together to form one-dimensional infinite chains. These monooxalate compounds often decompose upon prolonged storage due to conversion to (NpO_{2})_{2}C_{2}O_{4}·6H_{2}O.

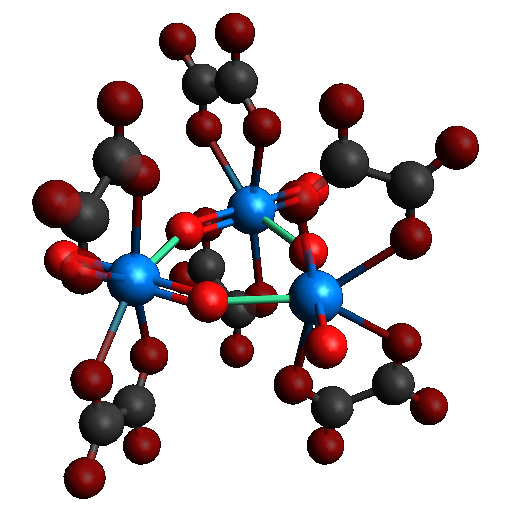
Cyclic neptunyl trimers in the structure of NH_{4}NpO_{2}C_{2}O_{4}.nH_{2}O. Cation-cation interactions are represented by sea green bonds, and surrounding oxalate ions are colored darker.

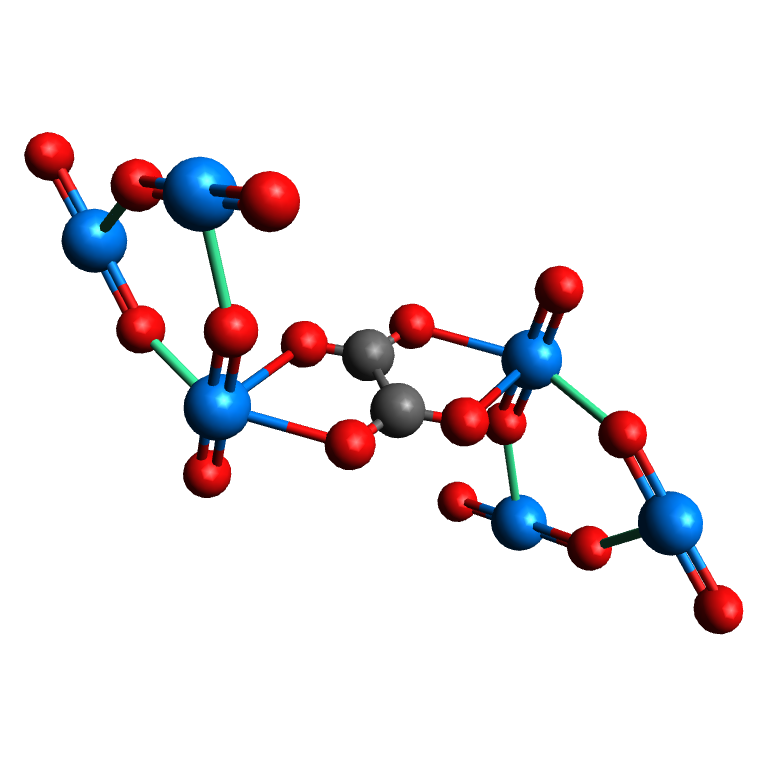
The coordination of bridging oxalate ions in the structure of NH_{4}NpO_{2}C_{2}O_{4}.nH_{2}O. Cation-cation interactions are represented by sea green bonds.

Neptunyl(V) oxalate compounds with [NpO_{2}]^{+}:[C_{2}O_{4}]^{2−} ratios greater than 1:1 are also known, such as Na_{4}(NpO_{2})_{2}(C_{2}O_{4})_{3}·xH_{2}O (x=2, 6) and Co(NH_{3})_{6}NpO_{2}(C_{2}O_{4})_{2}·xH_{2}O (x=1.5, 3, 4, 5). The compounds Na_{4}(NpO_{2})_{2}(C_{2}O_{4})_{3}·2H_{2}O and Na_{4}(NpO_{2})_{2}(C_{2}O_{4})_{3}·6H_{2}O have a [NpO_{2}]^{+}:[C_{2}O_{4}]^{2−} of 2:3, and can be called sesquioxalates. Na_{4}(NpO_{2})_{2}(C_{2}O_{4})_{3}·2H_{2}O has a chain structure, made up of dimers (groups of two) of neptunyl ions which are joined together through bridging oxalate ions. Neptunium has a coordination geometry of pentagonal bipyramidal; the equator is made up of five oxygen atoms from three oxalate groups. The neptunyl groups in dimers are connected by oxygen atoms coming from oxalate. On the contrary, Na_{4}(NpO_{2})_{2}(C_{2}O_{4})_{3}·6H_{2}O adopts a sheet structure. Like Na_{4}(NpO_{2})_{2}(C_{2}O_{4})_{3}·2H_{2}O, neptunyl groups are pentagonal bipyramidal with the equator made up of five oxygen atoms from three oxalate groups. Each oxalate group bridges the neptunyl group to a different neptunyl group, connecting the neptunyl ions together; two oxalate groups are bidentate while the third one is monodentate (bonding in one spot).

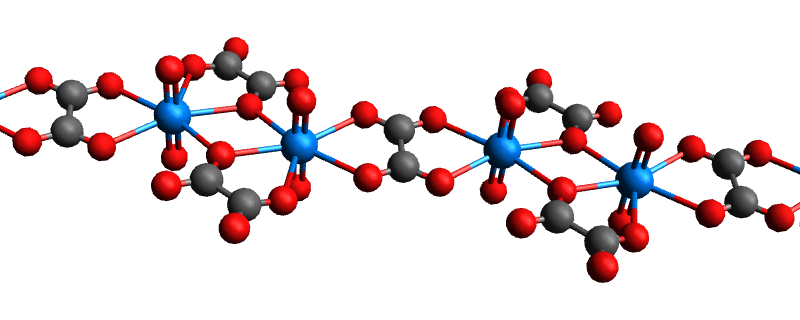
Neptunyl oxalate chains in the structure of Na_{4}(NpO_{2})_{2}(C_{2}O_{4})_{3}·2H_{2}O.

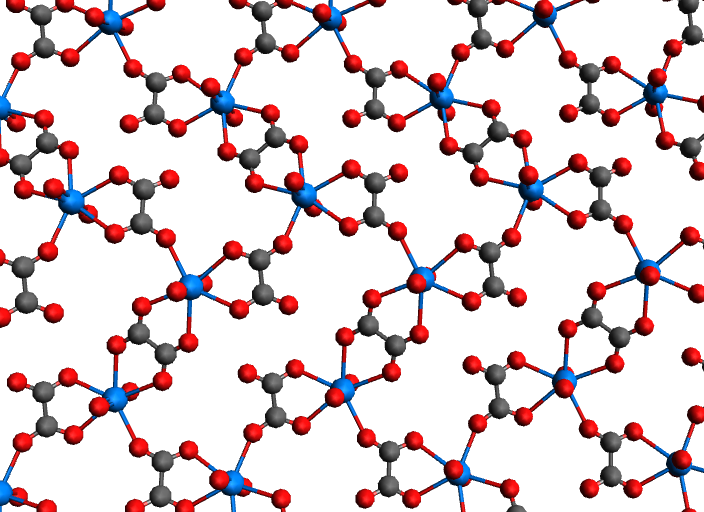
Neptunyl oxalate layers in the structure of Na_{4}(NpO_{2})_{2}(C_{2}O_{4})_{3}·6H_{2}O.

The Co(NH_{3})_{6}NpO_{2}(C_{2}O_{4})_{2}·xH_{2}O compounds can be called dioxalate complexes. In aqueous solution, dioxalate complexes can exist as NpO_{2}(C_{2}O_{4})_{2}(H_{2}O)^{3−}. The oxalate groups in this ion can undergo rapid ligand exchange with other oxalate groups:

[NpO_{2}(C_{2}O_{4})^{1}(C_{2}O_{4})^{2}(H_{2}O)]^{3−} + [(C_{2}O_{4})^{3}]^{2−} → [NpO_{2}(C_{2}O_{4})^{1}(C_{2}O_{4})^{3}(H_{2}O)]^{3−} + [(C_{2}O_{4})^{2}]^{2−}

Where superscripts denote individual oxalate ions. This ion can be isolated from solution in the form of these Co(NH_{3})_{6}NpO_{2}(C_{2}O_{4})_{2}·xH_{2}O compounds. The structures of both Co(NH_{3})_{6}NpO_{2}(C_{2}O_{4})_{2}·1.5H_{2}O and Co(NH_{3})_{6}NpO_{2}(C_{2}O_{4})_{2}·3H_{2}O contain dimers of composition [(NpO_{2})_{2}(C_{2}O_{4})_{4}]^{6−}, hexaamminecobalt(III) (Co(NH_{3})^{3+}_{6}) ions, and waters of crystallization. Again, neptunyl ions are pentagonal bipyramidal, with five oxygen atoms coming from three oxalates, and the neptunyl ions forming dimers are linked by oxalate oxygen atoms. Each of the four oxalate groups bonds with one neptunyl group to form a 5-membered ring, but two of them additionally form a bond to the other neptunyl group. While they both are made out of the same components, they have a different packing. On the contrary, Co(NH_{3})_{6}NpO_{2}(C_{2}O_{4})_{2}·4H_{2}O adopts a chained structure instead. While it again has neptunyl in a pentagonal bipyramidal fashion, with five oxygen atoms from three oxalate groups, two of these oxalate groups bridge to neighboring neptunyl groups, one oxalate being bidentate and one monodentate, and the third oxalate is bidentate, attaching to the side of the chain. The structure of the pentahydrate, Co(NH_{3})_{6}NpO_{2}(C_{2}O_{4})_{2}·5H_{2}O, is unknown, though it is possible that some water molecules bond directly to neptunium atoms. It is believed that neptunium atoms have a coordination geometry of hexagonal bipyramidal. Isostructural compounds containing plutonium instead of neptunium (plutonyl(V) oxalates) are also known.

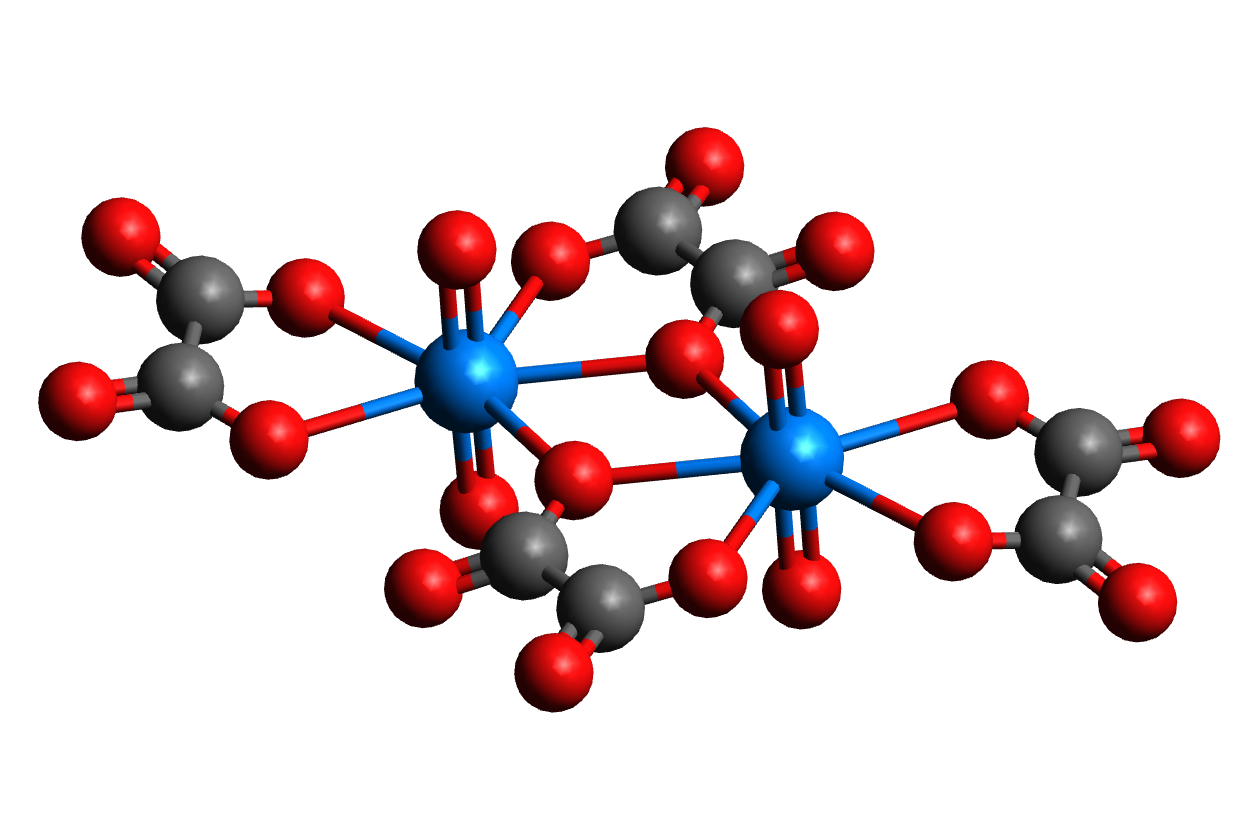
The structure of the [(NpO_{2})_{2}(C_{2}O_{4})_{4}]^{6−} ion in Co(NH_{3})_{6}NpO_{2}(C_{2}O_{4})_{2}·3H_{2}O.

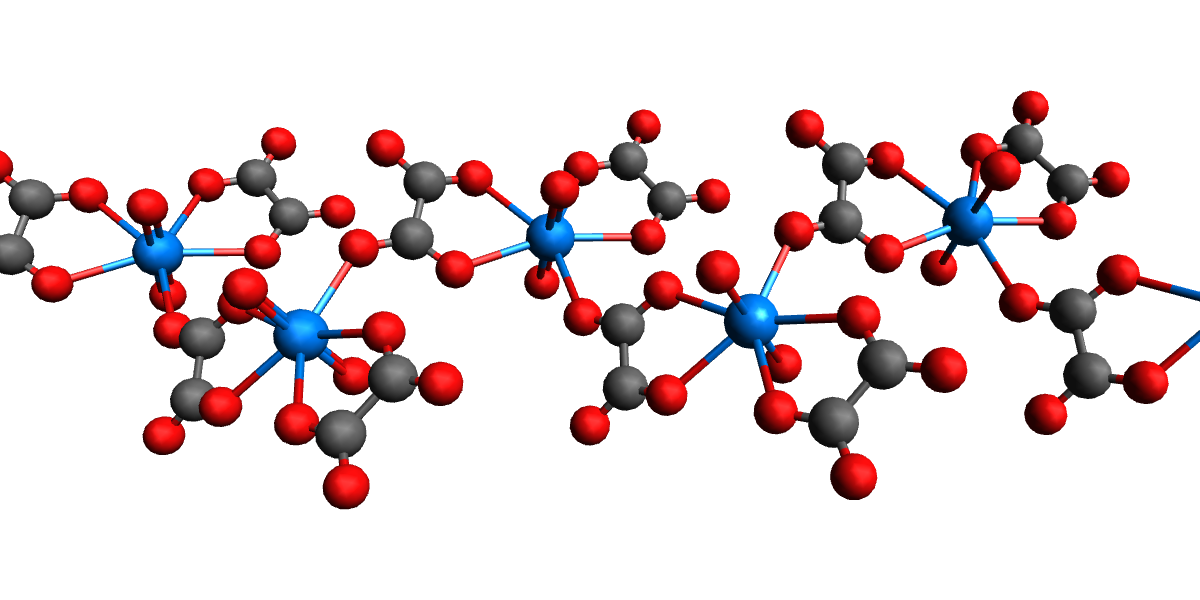
Neptunyl oxalate chains in the structure of Co(NH_{3})_{6}NpO_{2}(C_{2}O_{4})_{2}·4H_{2}O.

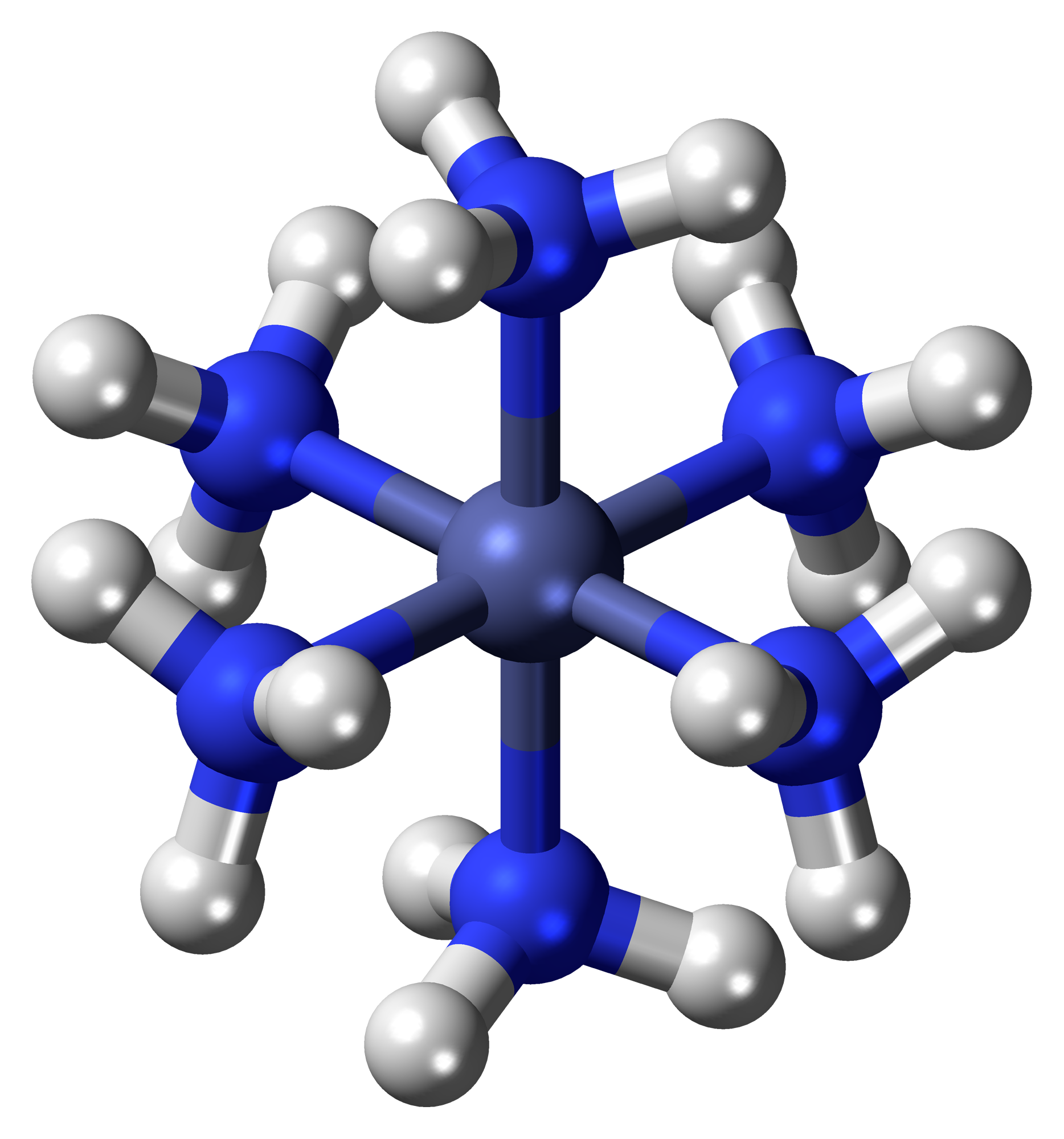
The hexamminecobalt(III) ion, the cation found in Co(NH_{3})_{6}NpO_{2}(C_{2}O_{4})_{2}·6H_{2}O.

A neptunium(V) oxalate compound containing hydroxide ions, Na_{2}NpO_{2}(C_{2}O_{4})OH·H_{2}O, is also known. It has been formed by the hydrothermal reaction between a neptunium(V) stock solution, oxalic acid, calcium chloride, sodium hydroxide, and hydrogen chloride. Its structure consists of chains of composition [NpO_{2}(C_{2}O_{4})OH^{2−}]_{n} separated by sodium ions and water molecules. The chains contain neptunyl dimers which are held together by bridging hydroxide groups. These dimers are bonded with neighboring dimers via oxalate groups, which bond monodentate to one neptunyl group and bidentate to another.

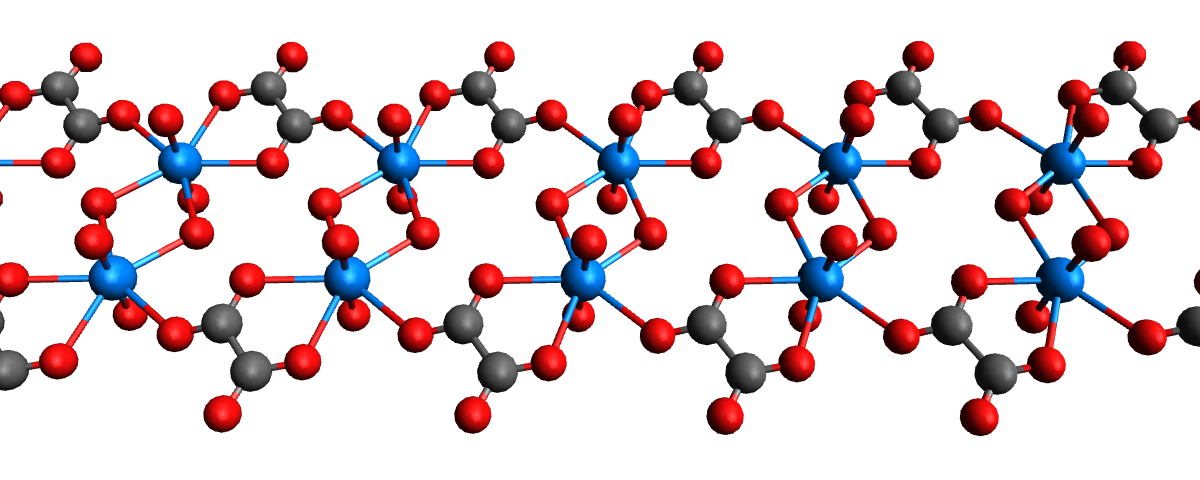
The neptunium oxalate chains in the chemical structure of the compound Na_{2}NpO_{2}C_{2}O_{4}OH. Hydrogen atoms are ommitted.
