= Fluorodeoxyuridylate =

Names
- IUPAC name 2′-Deoxy-5-fluorouridine 5′-(dihydrogen phosphate)
- Systematic IUPAC name [(2R,3S,5R)-5-(5-Fluoro-2,4-dioxo-3,4-dihydropyrimidin-1(2H)-yl)-3-hydroxyoxolan-2-yl]methyl dihydrogen phosphate
- Other names FdUMP

Identifiers
CAS Number	acid: 134-46-3; Na salt: 103226-10-4
3D model (JSmol)	acid: Interactive image; Na salt: Interactive image
ChEBI	acid: CHEBI:2129
ChEMBL	acid: ChEMBL886
ChemSpider	acid: 8321
DrugBank	acid: DB03761
KEGG	acid: C04242
PubChem CID	Na salt: 92043924
UNII	acid: 7CJ707H131
CompTox Dashboard (EPA)	acid: DTXSID60158450
- InChI: InChI=1S/C9H12FN2O8P/c10-4-2-12(9(15)11-8(4)14)7-1-5(13)6(20-7)3-19-21(16,17)18/h2,5-7,13H,1,3H2,(H,11,14,15)(H2,16,17,18)/t5-,6+,7+/m0/s1 Key: HFEKDTCAMMOLQP-RRKCRQDMSA-N; Na salt: InChI=1S/C9H12FN2O8P.Na/c10-4-2-12(9(15)11-8(4)14)7-1-5(13)6(20-7)3-19-21(16,17)18;/h2,5-7,13H,1,3H2,(H,11,14,15)(H2,16,17,18);/q;+1/p-1/t5-,6+,7+;/m0./s1 Key: MMBCLHTXMDSSCH-VWZUFWLJSA-M
- SMILES: acid: C1[C@@H]([C@H](O[C@H]1N2C=C(C(=O)NC2=O)F)COP(=O)(O)O)O; Na salt: C1[C@@H]([C@H](O[C@H]1N2C=C(C(=O)NC2=O)F)COP(=O)(O)[O-])O.[Na+]

Properties
Chemical formula	C_{9}H_{11}FN_{2}NaO_{8}P
Molar mass	348.155 g·mol^{−1}
- Except where otherwise noted, data are given for materials in their standard state (at 25 °C [77 °F], 100 kPa). Infobox references

Fluorodeoxyuridylate (5-FdUMP), also known as 5-fluoro-2'-deoxyuridylate, and 5-fluoro-2'-deoxyuridine 5'-monophosphate, is the monophosphate ester of 5-fluorodeoxyuridine (5-FdU). It is formed in vivo from 5-fluorouracil (5-FU) and 5-FdU.

FdUMP acts as a suicide inhibitor of thymidylate synthase (TS). By inhibiting the deoxynucleotide biosynthesis, FdUMP stops the rapidly proliferation of fast-growing tumors, and it is therefore widely used as a cancer treatment.

5-FU performs as a substrate during part of the catalytic cycle, and it is only during the synthesis of thymine from uridine, when it is combined with other molecules to form 5-FdUMP to produce an irreversible inhibition of the thymidylate synthase functions. This inhibition leads to an imbalance of the nucleotide grouping, stopping DNA synthesis.

== Function ==
=== 5-FU and floxuridine, precursors of FdUMP ===
The prodrug 5-fluorouracil (5-FU) was the first antimetabolite used as a TS inhibitor. It penetrates the cell through the same facilitated transport mechanism as the uracil, due to the analogy between the two molecules (similar shape and size). The transporter recognizes 5-FU as an endogenous molecule. Subsequently, the uracil and 5-FU compete to enter the cellular interior and it is the molecule with the highest concentration that will enter in greater abundance.

For 5-FU to inhibit TS by its mechanism of action, it must first be bioactivated through a series of reactions:

- 5-FU ends up becoming 5-FdUMP (the active form of the drug), that is, the one that is really going to be recognized by the TS and thus be able to inhibit it.
- In addition, the bioactivation pathway followed by 5-FU is the same as that followed by the endogenous substrate (uracil), using the same enzymes to bioactivate itself.

On the other hand, floxuridine (5-FUdR) is another prodrug that also inhibits TS; although its bioactivation process is much simpler than 5-FU, as it only has to be phosphorylated to become 5-FdUMP.

=== Inhibition mechanisms of FdUMP ===
Once the 5-FU or 5-FUdR prodrugs have been bioactivated resulting in FdUMP, they will already be recognized by the TS enzyme. When this happens, the enzyme goes through a conformational change to enable the union of the cofactor 5,10-Methylenetetrahydrofolic (5,10-CH2THF), which is necessary for the operation of the enzyme. Once this compound is united, the inhibition reaction begins with a different mechanism that would take place with the uracil.

The reaction begins when a cysteine residue present at the active enzyme site attacks the pyrimidine in position 2. Due to this, C5 attacks the cofactor forming a tertiary complex that includes the enzyme (TS), the drug (5-FdUMP) and the cofactor (5,10-CH2THF), which is irreversible.

After the formation of the complex, the drug loses its activity, so it is called a suicide inhibitor, as it does its function and remains inactivated due to the covalent bonds formed.

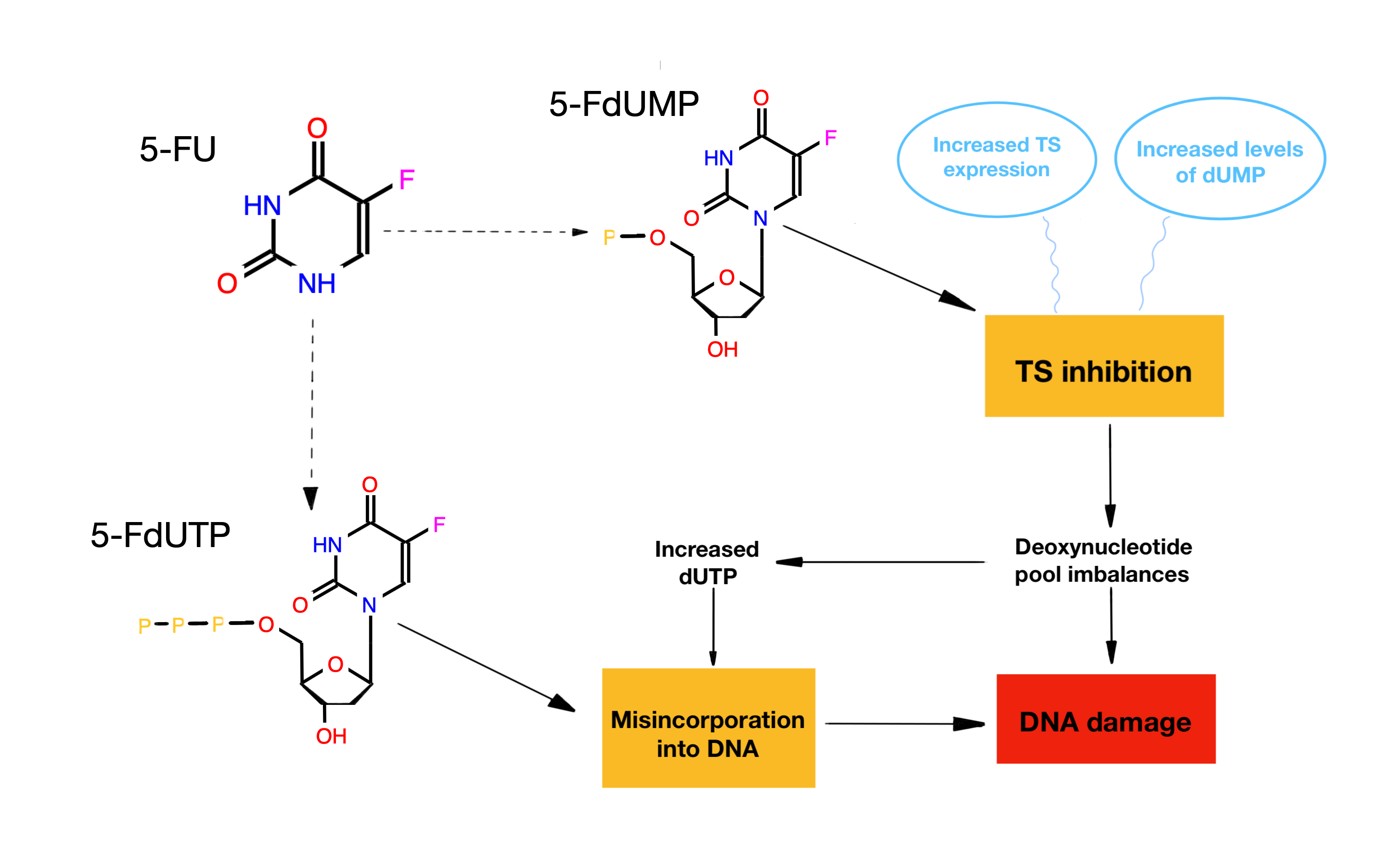
Consequences of the TS inhibition

=== Consequences of the TS inhibition ===
These are two of the different ways to cause cell death in the presence of FdUMP:

- When TS is inhibited, there is a decrease of TMP, among others, since it cannot be synthesized. Due to this, dTTP (the precursor nucleotide of DNA) will not be synthesized either, causing an alteration in the balance of nucleotides, so there will be variations in the mechanisms of synthesis and repair of DNA by the absence of thymine, causing cell death.
- If TS inhibition does not occur, 5- FdUMP, instead of inhibiting the enzyme, can triphosphorylate (5-FdUTP) and act as a substrate for DNA polymerase. Consequently, it is incorporated into DNA and, as it is not a natural substrate, it causes the destabilization of the molecule and the following rupture of the chain, acting as a mutagen and causing cell death.

=== Study about function ===
FdUMP 3D chemical structure

The aim of this study was to compare the effectiveness at the inhibition of the TS of different molecules including FdUMP, 5FU and 5-fluoro-2-desoxiuridine (FUdR). Therefore, several cells lines, including thymidine kinase deficient (TK) and thymidylate synthase deficient (TS) were used in order to determinate the dependency and specificity of TK for the inhibition of TS. The study could show that FdUMP inhibited the cellular growness with a bigger power than 5FU.

These direct inhibitors were also used with Raltitrexed and Pemetrexed, for instance. With the same cell lines, these inhibitors based in folic had also a bigger power than the fluoropyrimidines (FP). Surprisingly, Pemetrexed even inhibited the cellular growness of TS deficient cells.

The nucleotidase and fosfatase incubation resulted in a reduction of the cytotoxicity of FdUMP, which means that the drug can be demoted in cells.

In the in situ TS (TSIA) inhibition test, FM3A cells with 0.5 microM FdUMP and 0.05 microM FdUMP were exposed during 24 h. Finally, TSIA control was reduced in a 1-7%. The inhibition of the nucleotidase and fosfatase activity, decreased the effect of FdUMP, while the inhibitory effect was smaller in cells which had a lack of TK.

FdUMP can enter both intact cells and activated cells in which dephosphorylation has already started. To sum up, it was concluded that FdUMP can stop the FUdR resistance of some cells, by inhibiting TS directly.

== Medical applications in human colon cells ==
=== FA-FdUMP conjugate ===
There are currently several fluoropyrimidine-related chemotherapy treatments, such as 5-fluorouracil (5-FU), that are limited by drug chemoresistance. But it has been shown that the conjugation of FdUMP with folic acid (FA) by a phosphodiester bonding shows improved cytotoxicity to both human and 5-FU-resistant colorectal tumor cells. Therefore, FA-FdUMP conjugate is actually very useful for the treatment of malignant tumors resistant to 5-FU.

=== Adenocarcinoma in colon cells (DNA damages) ===
When comparing the capabilities of 5-FU and FdUMP in relation to human colon adenocarcinoma cells, it has been shown that both drugs can induce apoptosis, although their effect on the cell cycle progression is different. On the other hand, the difference in the moment in which the cell cycle stops suggests that the two drugs cause different types of primary DNA damages that could lead to the activation of different control points, and thus follow different DNA repair pathways.
