= Neptunium(IV) oxalate =

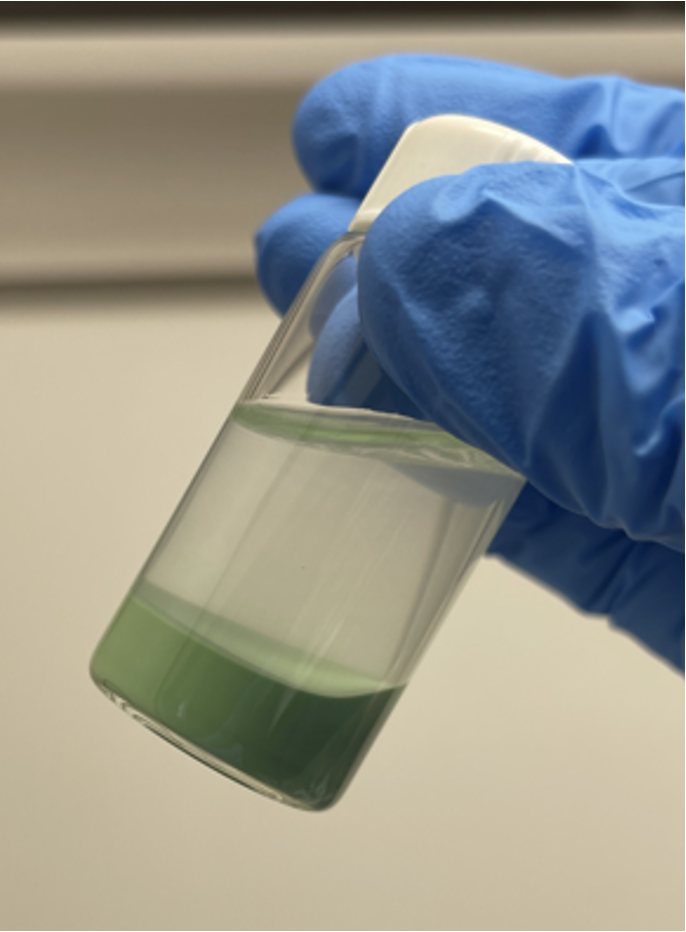
- Neptunium(IV) oxalate hexahydrate under aqueous solution

Identifiers
| CAS Number | 20196-48-9 |
| 3D model (JSmol) | Interactive image |
| ChemSpider | 129549567 |
| CompTox Dashboard (EPA) | DTXSID101336972 |
- InChI: InChI=1S/2C2H2O4.Np/c2*3-1(4)2(5)6;/h2*(H,3,4)(H,5,6);/q;;+4/p-4 Key: KBWUHCITSWHCDN-UHFFFAOYSA-J
- SMILES: C(=O)(C(=O)[O-])[O-].C(=O)(C(=O)[O-])[O-].[Np+4]

Properties
| Chemical formula | Np(C_{2}O_{4})_{2}·xH_{2}O (0 ≤ x ≤ 6) |
| Appearance | Green crystals |
| Solubility in water | Highly insoluble |

Structure (Note: Structural data for the hexahydrate, Np(C_{2}O_{4})_{2}·6H_{2}O.)
| Crystal structure | monoclinic |
| Space group | C2/m |
| Lattice constant | a = 9.0425 Å, b = 8.9475 Å, c = 7.8188 Å α = 90.00°, β = 93.228°, γ = 90.00° |
| Lattice volume (V) | 631.60 Å^{3} |
| Formula units (Z) | 2 |

Related compounds
| Other cations | Thorium oxalate; Uranium(IV) oxalate; Plutonium(IV) oxalate |
| Related neptunium oxalates | Neptunyl(V) oxalate; Neptunyl(VI) oxalate |
- Except where otherwise noted, data are given for materials in their standard state (at 25 °C [77 °F], 100 kPa). Infobox references

Neptunium(IV) oxalate is a chemical compound made up of neptunium(IV) (Np^{4+}) and oxalate (C_{2}O^{2−}_{4}) ions with the formula Np(C_{2}O_{4})_{2}. It has been known at least since 1947. It is known to form several hydrates with formulas Np(C_{2}O_{4})_{2}·xH_{2}O (x = 1, 2, 6). The hexahydrate (x = 6) is a highly insoluble solid prepared by adding oxalic acid to aqueous solutions containing neptunium(IV) and nitric acid, and forms green crystals. The structure of the compound was determined through X-ray diffraction.

At high temperatures, the hexahydrate decomposes, forming other hydrates and eventually neptunium(IV) oxide, NpO_{2}. Due to this, the high-temperature calcination of neptunium(IV) oxalate is used to produce NpO_{2}, which can be used for nuclear power applications or preparation of other neptunium compounds. Neptunium(IV) oxalate is also used to separate neptunium from other metals. The presence of neptunium in this compound causes it to be radioactive.

== Synthesis ==
Neptunium(IV) oxalate production usually starts from neptunium-nitric acid (HNO_{3}) solutions, though solutions with hydrochloric acid (HCl) can be used instead. The presence of higher neptunium oxidation states like +5 reduces the amount of oxalate filtered out, so it must be ensured that neptunium is in the +4 oxidation state in the initial nitric acid solution. Hydrazine (N_{2}H_{4}) or hydrazinium nitrate (N_{2}H_{5}NO_{3}) is added to the initial solution to stabilize the +4 oxidation state and prevent oxidation. Iron(II) sulfamate (Fe(NH_{2}SO_{3})_{2}) or ascorbic acid (C_{6}H_{8}O_{6}) is then added to reduce any neptunium(V) to neptunium(IV). With ascorbic acid, the reduction happens as follows:

2 NpO^{2+}_{2} + H_{2}A → 2 NpO^{+}_{2} + A + 2 H^{+}
2 NpO^{+}_{2} + 6 H^{+} + H_{2}A → 2 Np^{4+} + A + 4 H_{2}O (Note: Here, H_{2}A represents ascorbic acid (C_{6}H_{8}O_{6}), and A represents dehydroascorbic acid (C_{6}H_{6}O_{6}).)

Ascorbic acid is a slow reducing agent, but the process is sped up rapidly with increased nitric acid concentration and/or temperature. After neptunium(IV) solution is prepared, neptunium(IV) oxalate is produced via the addition of oxalic acid:

Np^{4+} + 2 H_{2}C_{2}O_{4} + 6 H_{2}O → Np(C_{2}O_{4})_{2}·6H_{2}O + 4 H^{+}

Oxalic acid is often added in a two-step precipitation process. After addition, the solid neptunium(IV) oxalate can easily be filtered out.

== Physical properties ==
Neptunium(IV) oxalate forms several hydrates, with formulas Np(C_{2}O_{4})_{2}·xH_{2}O (x=1, 2, 6). When neptunium(IV) oxalate is precipitated from aqueous solutions, green crystals of the hexahydrate (Np(C_{2}O_{4})_{2}·6H_{2}O) are formed. Other hydrates, such as the monohydrate (Np(C_{2}O_{4})_{2}·H_{2}O) and dihydrate (Np(C_{2}O_{4})_{2}·2H_{2}O), are formed by heating this compound. The dihydrate can also be produced by the dehydration of the hexahydrate with sulfuric acid. An anhydrous (lacking water) form, Np(C_{2}O_{4})_{2}, is formed on further heating.

Neptunium(IV) oxalate hexahydrate is highly insoluble in water. A study on its solubility in nitric acid–oxalic acid solutions found that its value ranges between 4.0 and 37.4 mg/L at 22 °C, but it increases with increasing temperature (19.0–373.5 mg/L at 45 °C, 32.4–420.1 mg/L at 60 °C). When the ratio of neptunium(IV) ions to oxalate ions is close to 1:2, solubility decreases as neptunium(IV) oxalate is precipitated out, but when it is less than or more than 1:2, solubility increases due to the formation of Np(C_{2}O_{4})^{2+} and Np(C_{2}O_{4})^{2−}_{3} ions, respectively. Equilibrium equations:

Np(C_{2}O_{4})_{2}·6H_{2}O (s) ⇌ Np(C_{2}O_{4})_{2} (aq) + 6 H_{2}O
Np(C_{2}O_{4})_{2} + 2 H^{+} ⇌ Np(C_{2}O_{4})^{2+} + H_{2}C_{2}O_{4}
Np(C_{2}O_{4})_{2} + H_{2}C_{2}O_{4} ⇌ Np(C_{2}O_{4})^{2−}_{3} + 2 H^{+}

== Structure ==
The structure of the hexahydrate (Np(C_{2}O_{4})_{2}·6H_{2}O) was determined via X-ray diffraction. While initial studies from Grigor'ev et al. suggested that each neptunium atom was bonded to four oxalate groups with a coordination geometry of cubic, later studies from Sockwell et al. suggest that each neptunium atom is bonded to two water molecules as well. Neptunium, oxalate, and water molecules join together to form layers of composition [Np(C_{2}O_{4})_{2}(H_{2}O)_{2}]_{n}. Three of the oxalate groups per neptunium atom lie perpendicular to the layers, while the other lies parallel, providing room to fit the two water molecules. Between these [Np(C_{2}O_{4})_{2}(H_{2}O)_{2}]_{n} layers lie the rest of the water molecules, four per formula unit. Each oxalate group donates two oxygen atoms to neptunium, and each water molecule donates one atom, so neptunium atoms are bonded to ten oxygen atoms total.

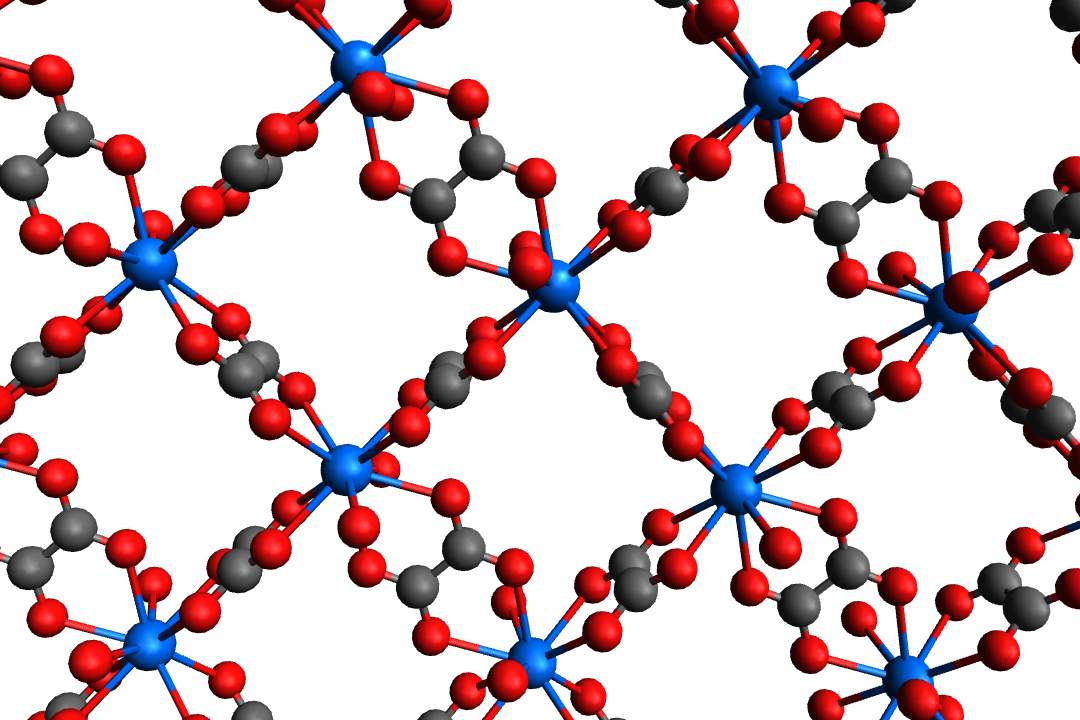
A single layer.

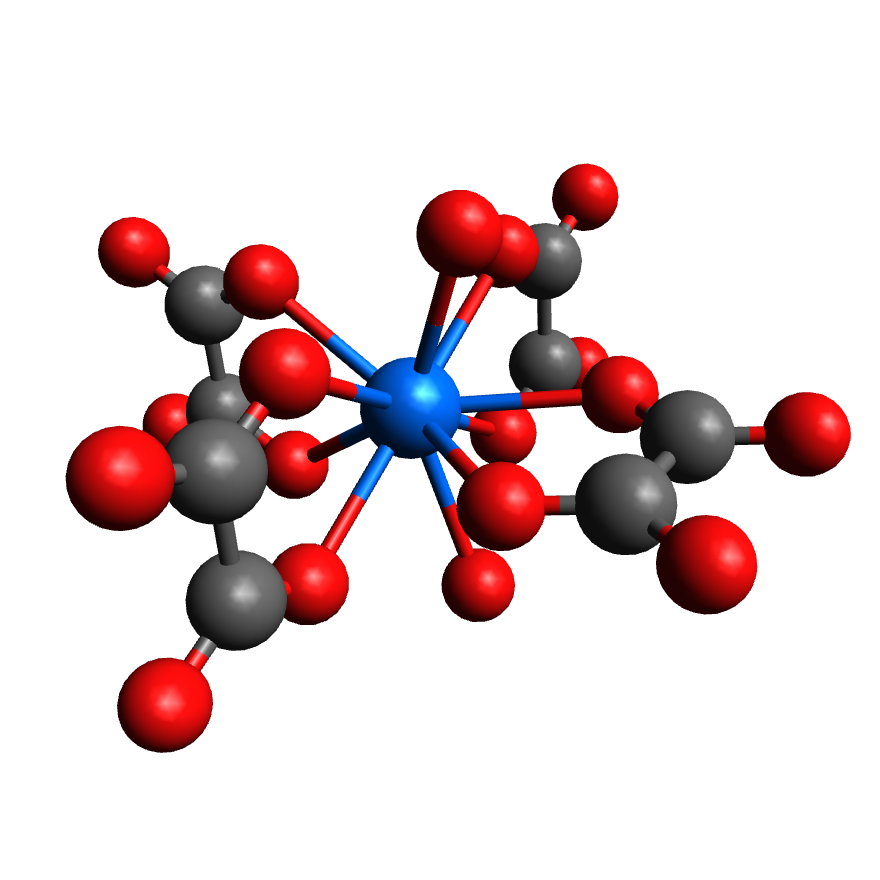
The coordination sphere of neptunium within the layers.

Diagram of the [Np(C_{2}O_{4})_{2}(H_{2}O)_{2}]_{n} layers in Np(C_{2}O_{4})_{2}·6H_{2}O's structure. Hydrogen atoms are omitted. Blue is neptunium, grey is carbon, and red is oxygen.

== Decomposition ==
Neptunium(IV) oxalate decomposes when heated. Starting with the hexahydrate, Np(C_{2}O_{4})_{2}·6H_{2}O, four water molecules per formula unit are lost between 80 and 90 °C. The fifth one is split off at 100–120 °C, and the last is split off at 190–200 °C. The oxalate groups decompose between 170 °C and 370 °C. One study states that an intermediate (NpO_{2})_{2}C_{2}O_{4} phase is formed as neptunium is oxidized to the +5 oxidation state, but later work suggests that oxalate is lost gradually. The same work also reports the formation of an unidentified compound around 350–390 °C during decomposition. Raman spectroscopy rules out this compound being neptunium(V) oxide (Np_{2}O_{5}) or a neptunium carbonate compound, so it is proposed this compound could be hyperstoichiometric neptunium(IV) oxide (NpO_{2+x}), though its existence is controversial. The decomposition ultimately results in neptunium(IV) oxide (NpO_{2}), which is formed above 300 °C; neptunium(IV) oxalate is fully converted to neptunium(IV) oxide at 500 °C.

== Applications ==
=== Neptunium separation and purification ===
Neptunium(IV) oxalate is an intermediate in neptunium separation and purification. Adding oxalic acid to a solution of other metals, such as alkali, alkaline earth, or transition metals, will precipitate neptunium as neptunium(IV) oxalate, allowing it to be separated from most other metals. It is also used in the separation of neptunium from other actinides, where a modification of the PUREX process with adjusted acid and tributyl phosphate concentrations is used. Neptunium(IV) oxalate is the form of neptunium which is isolated in this process, and it can then be calcined to produce neptunium(IV) oxide, NpO_{2}.

=== Synthesis of other neptunium compounds ===
Neptunium(IV) oxalate can be easily filtered out and decomposed, allowing it to be used for the production of neptunium(IV) oxide, NpO_{2}. The calcination of neptunium(IV) oxalate is the main method of producing NpO_{2}, first appearing in 1961. After being precipitated, neptunium(IV) oxalate is heated in a stream of air or nitrogen, where the temperature is raised to 100–150 °C over the course of an hour. After being held at that temperature for another hour, the temperature is further increased 500–550 °C for an hour, held there for two hours, and then cooled to room temperature under the gas stream. This method has been used by the Savannah River Plant facilities for production of plutonium-238 for radioisotope thermoelectric generators. Neptunium(IV) oxide is also a major form of neptunium in radioactive waste, and is used to make other neptunium compounds, like neptunium(III) fluoride (via reaction with hydrogen gas and hydrogen fluoride), neptunium(IV) fluoride (via reaction with hydrogen fluoride) or neptunium(IV) chloride (via reaction with carbon tetrachloride).

Neptunium(IV) oxalate has been known at least since 1947, when it was used in the synthesis of neptunium(IV) chloride by reacting it with carbon tetrachloride. Neptunium(IV) oxalate, when reacted with ozone while suspended in water, is oxidized to a neptunium(V) oxalate compound, NpO_{2}HC_{2}O_{4}, and subsequently to neptunyl(VI) hydroxide (NpO_{2}(OH)_{2}). This reaction is proposed as a method of producing NpO_{2}(OH)_{2} for laboratory studies.

== Related compounds ==
Other oxalates where neptunium is in the +4 oxidation state include an acid oxalate with formula (H_{3}O)_{2}Np_{2}(C_{2}O_{4})_{5}·7H_{2}O. This compound can be formed in many of the same conditions as Np(C_{2}O_{4})_{2}·6H_{2}O can, and can be obtained in pure form at nitric acid concentrations of >3 M and neptunium concentrations of 0.01–0.02 M. Other double salts with formulas M_{2}Np_{2}(C_{2}O_{4})_{5} (M=Na, K, NH_{4}) are known. A neptunium(IV) oxalate complex with the formula Np(C_{2}O_{4})^{6−}_{5} is known, and can be crystallized with hexaaminecobalt(III) as the compound [Co(NH_{3})_{6}]_{2}[Np(C_{2}O_{4})_{5}]·4H_{2}O. The neptunium atoms form ionic bonds with the oxygen atoms from the oxalate groups, and, unlike in neutral neptunium(IV) oxalate itself, the oxalate groups are non-bridging. As these related compounds contain neptunium, like with neutral neptunium(IV) oxalate, they are radioactive.
