= Chromium(III) phosphate =

- Cr^{3+}PO^{3−}_{4}

Names
- IUPAC name Chromium(III) phosphate
- Other names: Chromium phosphate; Chromium monophosphate; Chromium orthophosphate; Chromic phosphate

Identifiers
CAS Number	7789-04-0; 84359-31-9 (hexahydrate)
3D model (JSmol)	Interactive image
ChemSpider	56424
ECHA InfoCard	100.029.219
EC Number	232-141-0
PubChem CID	62673
UNII	AQ86ZJ9U98
CompTox Dashboard (EPA)	DTXSID70884435
- InChI: InChI=1S/Cr.H3O4P/c;1-5(2,3)4/h;(H3,1,2,3,4)/q+3;/p-3 Key: IKZBVTPSNGOVRJ-UHFFFAOYSA-K
- SMILES: [O-]P(=O)([O-])[O-].[Cr+3]

Properties
Chemical formula	CrPO_{4}
Molar mass	146.97 g/mol
Density	4.236 g/cm^{3}
Melting point	1,907 °C (3,465 °F; 2,180 K)
Boiling point	2,671 °C (4,840 °F; 2,944 K)
Solubility in water	insoluble, exothermal blue solution

Structure
Crystal structure	monoclinic

Hazards
- GHS labelling
Pictograms	(GHS07: Exclamation mark)
Signal word	Warning
Hazard statements	H302, H315, H319
Precautionary statements	P264, P264+P265, P270, P280, P301+P317, P302+P352, P305+P351+P338, P321, P330, P332+P317, P337+P317, P362+P364, P501
- NIOSH (US health exposure limits)
PEL (Permissible)	TWA 1 mg/m^{3}
REL (Recommended)	TWA 0.5 mg/m^{3}
IDLH (Immediate danger)	250 mg/m^{3}
- Except where otherwise noted, data are given for materials in their standard state (at 25 °C [77 °F], 100 kPa). Infobox references

Chromium(III) phosphate describes inorganic compounds with the chemical formula CrPO_{4}·nH_{2}O, where n = 0, 4, or 6. All are deeply colored solids. Anhydrous CrPO_{4} is green while the hexahydrate CrPO_{4}·6H_{2}O is violet.

== Structure and properties ==
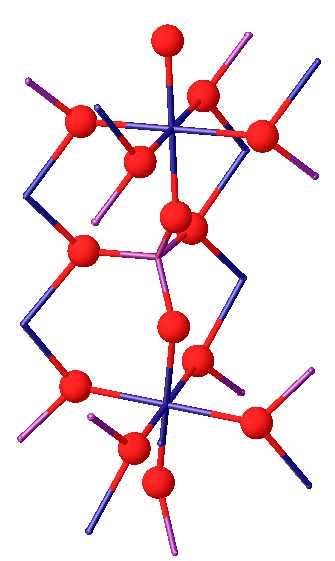
structure of CrPO_{4}

Chromium(III) phosphate can exist as two isomorphs. Its β-isoform is orthorhombic with the Cmcm space group (a = 516.5 pm (5.165 Å), b = 775.0 pm (7.750 Å), c = 613.1 pm (6.131 Å)). The structure consists of infinite chains of trans edge-sharing CrO_{6} octahedra, which run parallel to the c-axis, and are linked by PO_{4} tetrahedra. Above 1,175 °C (1,448 K), β-CrPO_{4} converts to α-CrPO_{4}. α-CrPO_{4} is orthorhombic as well, with the Imma space group (a = 1.0380, b = 1.2845, c = 0.6278 nm). The structure consists of an infinite network of linked polyhedra with a CrO_{6} octahedron and a PO_{4} tetrahedron sharing a common edge. The Cr^{3+} site form edge-sharing Cr(2)/Cr(2') pairs and share two corners with the four Cr(I) octahedra.

=== Magnetic properties ===
The magnetic properties of the β-CrPO_{4} are a result of the cation-cation distances along the octahedral chains which give rise to strong direct-exchange interactions and even metal-metal bonding. Neutron diffraction studies reveal that the spiral moments in β-CrPO_{4} are collinear and anti-ferromagnetically coupled along the chains in the 001 planes, at low temperature (5K, μeff = 2.55 μB). Observations from a diffraction study has shown that at low temperature (2K), the α-CrPO_{4} octahedra CrO_{6} units build up an infinite, three-dimensional network expected to provide strong Cr-O-Cr magnetic superexchange linkages with exchange pathway through the phosphate group. These linkages give the structure its anti-ferromagnetic characteristic (Ɵ = -35.1 K, μeff = 3.50 μB) which results in the antiparallel magnetic spins in the plane that is perpendicular to the chains of the octahedral CrO_{6}.

== Synthesis ==
Chromium phosphate is prepared by treating a phosphoric acid solution of chromium trioxide with hydrazine.

=== Hexahydrate ===
CrPO_{4}·6H_{2}O, is prepared by reducing chromium trioxide, CrO_{3}, with ethanol in the presence of orthophosphoric acid, H_{3}PO_{4}, at temperatures ranging from −24 °C to +80 °C.

=== Mesoporous phase ===
Gel-like chromium(III) phosphate is prepared through the reduction of ammonium dichromate, (NH_{4})_{2}Cr_{2}O_{7}, using ethanol, CH_{3}COOH, and nitric acid, HNO_{3}. This process is done in the presence of ammonium dihydrogen phosphate and urea at an elevated temperature where tetradecyltrimethylammonium bromide (TTBr) is used as structure directing agent.

=== Films ===
Preparation of textured chromium phosphate is carried out by mixing equimolar solutions of aqueous chromium nitrate and diammonium phosphate in a dish placed in a sealed chamber with the low temperature ammonia vapor catalyst diffusing into the solution at a constant rate. After 24h, the resulting purple film grows out from the liquid through the hydrolysis and polycondensation occurring in the reaction environment at the air/liquid and film/liquid boundary. Surface tension makes the film compact making it easy to insert a microscope slide and lift the film from underneath the solution surface. Once obtained the solution is washed with deionized water and ethanol, then dried in a vacuum.

=== Amorphous phase ===
The preparation of anhydrous chromium(III) phosphate begins by grinding a mixture of 75 mol% of chromium(III) oxide, Cr_{2}O_{3}, and 25 mol% of diammonium phosphate, (NH_{4})_{2}HPO_{4}. This mixture is pressed into pellets and heated under air pressure at 400 °C for 24h in order to remove ammonia and water. After this, a heating sequence of 450 °C (24 h), 700 °C (3⋅24 h), 800 °C (24 h) and 850 °C (2⋅24 h) occurs. The pellet mixture is gradually cooled thereafter.

== Uses ==
=== Ion exchange ===
At a high temperature and pH ranging from 283-383 K and pH 4-7 respectively, equilibrated KOH/HCl solution, insoluble CrPO_{4} solid and aqueous cation solution yield a sorption reaction. Studies reveal that CrPO_{4} catalyzes the adsorption of divalent cations onto its amorphous surface through the cation exchange mechanism. The mechanism suggests that the H^{+} ions are liberated from the solid to aqueous phase as the cations become hydrolyzed and adsorb onto the catalyst surface. Thus, a decrease in the pH of the reaction is used as a direct indicator of the rate of adsorption in the reaction:

n P-OH + M^{z+} ⇌ (P-O)_{n}M^{(z-n)} + n H^{+} where (P-O) = solid

A plot of the Kurbatov equation is used to relate the release of H^{+} ion to the equilibrium constant of the reaction:

log K_{d} = log K_{ex} + npH_{eq}

where K_{d} (L g^{-1}) represents the distribution coefficient, and n is the slope of the straight line giving an indication of the H^{+}/M^{z+} stoichiometry of the exchange reaction. Under similar conditions, the selectivity of CrPO_{4} for dative cations follows the sequence: Pb^{2+} > Cu^{2+} > Ni^{2+} ≅ Cd^{2+}. Increases in temperature and pH enhances the ion exchange reaction.

Chromium(III) phosphate is also used to catalyze cation exchange in sorption reactions. This catalysis is widely used in the reduction of metal toxicity during environmental clean-ups. This has been applied in decreasing the concentration of lead in aquatic habitat and drinking water.

=== Anti-corrosive coating ===
Paints containing chromium(III) phosphate have been used as corrosion-resistant coating for metals. The paints consist of aqueous acidic chromium(III) phosphate solution which convert to a consistent film when applied onto metals heavily used in manufacturing and utility such as zinc, zinc alloy, aluminum and aluminum alloy substrates. Application methods include electroplating, immersing or spraying the solution on the surface of the substrate.

=== Catalyst ===
Chromium(III) phosphate has various applications in the polymer industry. Combined chromium(III) aluminum phosphate is widely used as a catalyst in the alkylation of aromatic hydrocarbons using alcohols such as the methylation of toluene using methanol. The alcohol is dehydrated into ether while the alkyl substituted product could be used as an intermediate in the manufacture of synthetic fibers such as polyethylene terephthalate.

=== Polymer ===
Pretreatment with chromium(III) phosphate-silicate is also used as a laminated structure to dampen vibration and noise in a motor.

== Toxicity ==
Although chromium(III) phosphate is hardly soluble in water, overexposure to the compound from the environment, industrial locations and abrasions from metal on metal implants could have harmful effects. The toxicity of chromium(III) phosphate depends on the duration of exposure, chromium(III) phosphate concentration, entry routes across a membrane barrier and release of trivalent chromium ion from the chromium(III) phosphate. Macrophage cells in the body exposed to chromium(III) phosphate engulf or phagocytize the compound into its endosomal and lysosomal environment which is acidic. This catalyzes a proteolytic reaction yielding a dose-dependent increase in chromium(III) ion release in the affected cells. The Cr^{3+} ion has toxic effects on the proteins of the cytosol and mitochondria by oxidatively modifying their chemical properties thus disenabling them from performing their functions. Proteins with high metal affinity such as enolase, catalase enzymes and hemoglobin, ferritin molecular transporters are affected. This may ultimately lead to nephrotoxicity, reproductive and developmental toxicity due to tissue damage, necrosis and inflammation.

== See also ==
- Chromium(III)
- Chromium(IV)
- Aluminum phosphate
- Chromic acid
- Chrome alum
- Chromate Conversion Coating
