= Neodymium(III) phosphate =

Inorganic compound

Identifiers
CAS Number	14298-32-9
3D model (JSmol)	Interactive image
ChemSpider	146173
ECHA InfoCard	100.034.741
EC Number	238-232-1
PubChem CID	167060
CompTox Dashboard (EPA)	DTXSID3065748
- InChI: InChI=1S/Nd.H3O4P/c;1-5(2,3)4/h;(H3,1,2,3,4)/q+3;/p-3 Key: DZNFWGVDYGAMJB-UHFFFAOYSA-K
- SMILES: [O-]P(=O)([O-])[O-].[Nd+3]

Properties
Chemical formula	NdO_{4}P
Molar mass	239.212 g·mol^{−1}
- Except where otherwise noted, data are given for materials in their standard state (at 25 °C [77 °F], 100 kPa). Infobox references

Neodymium(III) phosphate is an inorganic compound, with the chemical formula of NdPO_{4}.

== Properties ==
Neodymium(III) phosphate hemihydrate can be obtained by the reaction of neodymium(III) chloride and phosphoric acid:

NdCl_{3} + H_{3}PO_{4} → NdPO_{4} + 3 HCl

Its anhydrous form can be obtained by the reaction of silicon pyrophosphate (SiP_{2}O_{7}) and neodymium(III) fluoride.

Neodymium(III) phosphate reacts with calcium pyrophosphate to obtain Ca_{9}Nd(PO_{4})_{7}.
