= Thorium oxalate =

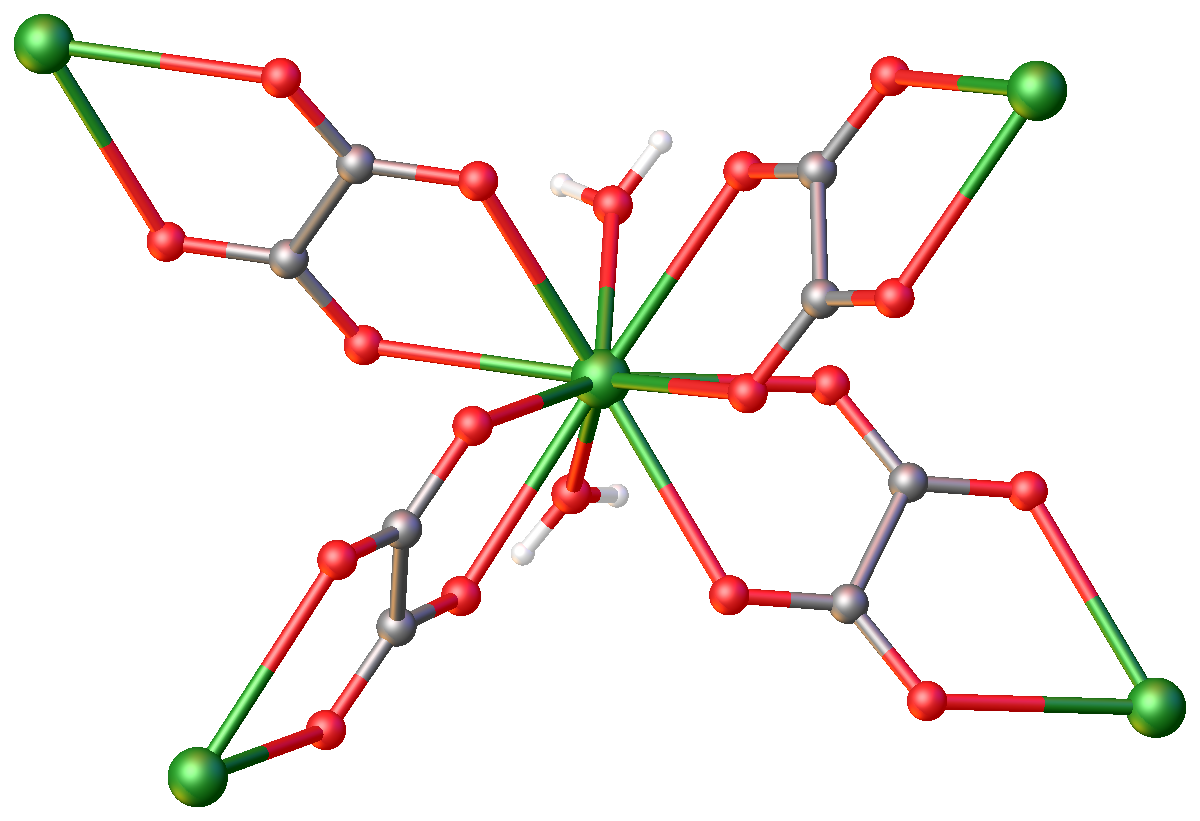

Identifiers
CAS Number	2040-52-0
3D model (JSmol)	Interactive image
ChemSpider	23350268
ECHA InfoCard	100.016.400
EC Number	218-038-3
PubChem CID	74880
UNII	68C5PQN2GF
CompTox Dashboard (EPA)	DTXSID90942566
- InChI: InChI=1S/2C2H2O4.Th/c2*3-1(4)2(5)6;/h2*(H,3,4)(H,5,6); Key: MVVXFNGAKVVFBW-UHFFFAOYSA-N
- SMILES: C(=O)(C(=O)O)O.C(=O)(C(=O)O)O.[Th]

Properties
Chemical formula	C_{4}O_{8}Th
Molar mass	408.07 g/mol 444.114 g/mol (dihydrate)
Density	4.637 g/cm^{3} (anhydrous)
Solubility product (K_{sp})	5.01 × 10^{−25}
- Except where otherwise noted, data are given for materials in their standard state (at 25 °C [77 °F], 100 kPa). Infobox references

Thorium oxalate is the inorganic compound with the formula Th(C_{2}O_{4})_{2}(H_{2}O)_{4}. It is a white insoluble solid prepared by the reaction of thorium(IV) salts with oxalic acid. The material is a coordination polymer. Each Th(IV) center is bound to 10 oxygen centers: eight provided by the bridging oxalates and two by a pair of aquo ligands. Two additional waters of hydration are observed in the lattice.

The solubility product (K_{sp}) of thorium oxalate is 5.01 × 10^{−25}. The density of anhydrous thorium oxalate is 4.637 g/cm^{3}.
