= Dysprosium(III) phosphate =

Identifiers
CAS Number	13863-49-5
3D model (JSmol)	Interactive image
ChemSpider	13493949
ECHA InfoCard	100.034.172
EC Number	237-605-6
PubChem CID	14671408
CompTox Dashboard (EPA)	DTXSID20930173
- InChI: InChI=1S/Dy.H3O4P/c;1-5(2,3)4/h;(H3,1,2,3,4)/q+3;/p-3 Key: UIUJMPLGCICBOO-UHFFFAOYSA-K
- SMILES: [O-]P(=O)([O-])[O-].[Dy+3]

Properties
Chemical formula	DyPO_{4}
Appearance	solid
Solubility in water	insoluble
- Except where otherwise noted, data are given for materials in their standard state (at 25 °C [77 °F], 100 kPa). Infobox references

Dysprosium(III) phosphate is an inorganic compound with the chemical formula DyPO_{4}.

== Preparation ==
Dysprosium(III) phosphate can be obtained by reacting dysprosium(III) oxide and ammonium dihydrogen phosphate at high temperature:

Dy_{2}O_{3} + 2 (NH_{4})(H_{2}PO_{4}) → 2 DyPO_{4} + 2 NH_{3} + 3 H_{2}O

== Properties ==
Dysprosium(III) phosphate decomposes into dysprosium oxyphosphate and phosphorus pentoxide above 1200 °C. It reacts with sodium fluoride to obtain NaDyFPO_{4}:

NaF + DyPO_{4} → NaDyFPO_{4}

It reacts with sodium molybdate at high temperature to generate Na_{2}Dy(MoO_{4})(PO_{4}):

Na_{2}MoO_{4} + DyPO_{4} → Na_{2}Dy(MoO_{4})(PO_{4})
