= Gold(III) phosphate =

Names
- Other names: Auric phosphate

Identifiers
CAS Number	1204296-55-8
3D model (JSmol)	Interactive image
PubChem CID	25254913
- InChI: InChI=1S/Au.H3O4P/c;1-5(2,3)4/h;(H3,1,2,3,4)/q+3;/p-3
- SMILES: [O-]P(=O)([O-])[O-].[Au+3]

Properties
Chemical formula	AuPO_{4}
Molar mass	291.94 g/mol
Appearance	Pale yellow solid
Density	5.74 g/cm^{3}
Melting point	450 °C (842 °F; 723 K) (decomposes)
Solubility in water	Insoluble
Solubility	Insoluble in acetone

Structure
Crystal structure	Monoclinic
Coordination geometry	4 (Au)
Molecular shape	Square planar (around Au)

Thermochemistry
Std enthalpy of formation (Δ_{f}H^{⦵}_{298})	-169.8 kJ/mol (predicted)
- Except where otherwise noted, data are given for materials in their standard state (at 25 °C [77 °F], 100 kPa). Infobox references

Gold(III) phosphate is a chemical compound with the formula AuPO_{4}. It is a pale yellow solid that is insoluble in water and acetone. It decomposes at 450 °C into gold metal, phosphorus pentoxide, and oxygen.

== Production ==
Gold(III) phosphate is produced by the reaction of gold(III) hydroxide and phosphoric acid at 130 °C:

AuO(OH) + H_{3}PO_{4} → AuPO_{4} + 2H_{2}O

It can also be produced by the reaction of gold(III) hydroxide with a mixture of nitric acid and phosphorus pentoxide.
