= Cation–cation bond =

Cation-cation interactions often occur between molecular cations of transition metals and f-elements (so-called yl cations). They are distinguished as a separate type of intermolecular interactions, since without taking them into account, cations usually repel each other in accordance with Coulomb's law.

== Cation-cation interactions in f-elements ==
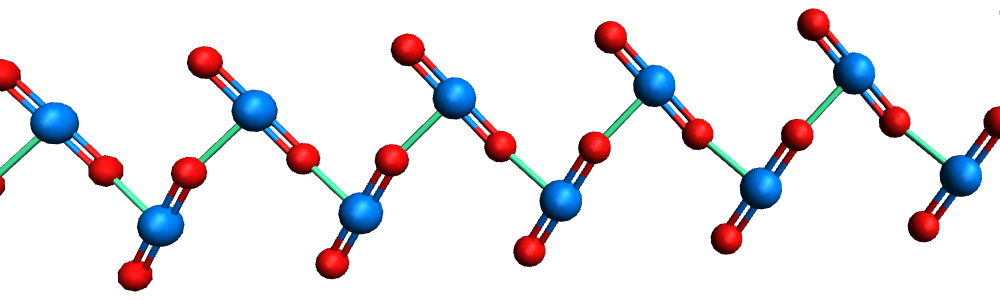
Chains of neptunyl ions in the structure of neptunyl(V) perchlorate tetrahydrate, NpO_{2}ClO_{4}(H_{2}O)_{4}. Sea green bonds represent cation-cation interactions between neptunyl ions.

Of particular interest are cation-cation interactions between actinide cations - uranium, in the form of uranyl UO_{2}^{2+}, neptunium in the form of neptunyl NpO_{2}^{2+}, plutonium and americium, which are essentially a manifestation of specific complex formation. They are a special case of intermolecular interactions that occur in molecular ions. It was first discovered when studying the behavior of neptunium(V) compounds in solutions of uranyl perchlorate. Great impact to crystallochemistry of cation-cation bonds was made by Mikhail Grigoriev.

The cation-cation interaction [NpO_{2}]^{+} determines the crystal structure of Np(V) compounds, and the strength of cation-cation bonds between neptunyl ions in a solid is comparable to the strength of ordinary bonds with acid ligands, although in an aqueous solution, apparently, there are somewhat fewer of these connections. In an organic solution, the intensity of C-C interactions can remain high. In the absence of mutual coordination of neptunium ions, Np(V) compounds can exhibit both structural similarity with An(VI) compounds and fundamental differences (showing a tendency to unite Np coordination polyhedra through common equatorial edges). Cation-cation interactions can be detected not only by data from structural studies, but also according to vibrational spectroscopy data. For uranyl, cation-cation interactions are also recorded in the gas phase.

== Cation-cation interactions in transition metal ions ==
For transition metals, cation-cation interactions appear in nitrene complexes. Nitrenium ligands provide an excellent platform for the simple and efficient synthesis of extremely rare complexes that have positively charged ligands coordinated to positively charged metals to form stable cation-cation and cation-dication coordination bonds.
