= Plutonium compounds =

Chemical compounds containing the element plutonium

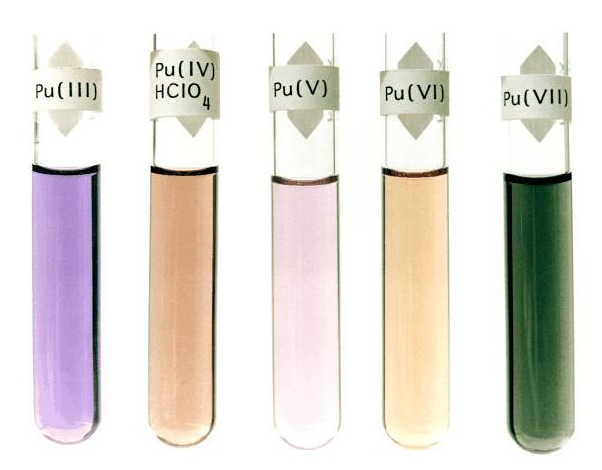
Various oxidation states of plutonium in solution

Plutonium compounds are compounds containing the element plutonium (Pu). At room temperature, pure plutonium is silvery in color but gains a tarnish when oxidized. The element displays four common ionic oxidation states in aqueous solution and one rare one:

- Pu(III), as Pu^{3+} (blue lavender)
- Pu(IV), as Pu^{4+} (yellow brown)
- Pu(V), as PuO^{+}_{2} (light pink) (Note: The PuO^{+}_{2} ion is unstable in solution and will disproportionate into Pu^{4+} and PuO^{2+}_{2}; the Pu^{4+} will then oxidize the remaining PuO^{+}_{2} to PuO^{2+}_{2}, being reduced in turn to Pu^{3+}. Thus, aqueous solutions of PuO^{+}_{2} tend over time towards a mixture of Pu^{3+} and PuO^{2+}_{2}. UO^{+}_{2} is unstable for the same reason.)
- Pu(VI), as PuO^{2+}_{2} (pink orange)
- Pu(VII), as PuO^{3−}_{5} (green)-the heptavalent ion is rare.

The color shown by plutonium solutions depends on both the oxidation state and the nature of the acid anion. It is the acid anion that influences the degree of complexing—how atoms connect to a central atom—of the plutonium species.

A +8 oxidation state has been reported as well in the volatile tetroxide PuO_{4}. Though it readily decomposes via a reduction mechanism similar to FeO_{4}, it is stated that PuO_{4} can be stabilized in alkaline solutions, tetrachloromethane, and chloroform. However, a more recent study showed that Pu(VIII) does not form in aqueous alkaline solutions.

Metallic plutonium is produced by reacting plutonium tetrafluoride with barium, calcium or lithium at 1200 °C. Metallic plutonium is attacked by acids, oxygen, and steam but not by alkalis and dissolves easily in concentrated hydrochloric, hydroiodic and perchloric acids. Molten metal must be kept in a vacuum or an inert atmosphere to avoid reaction with air. At 135 °C the metal will ignite in air and will explode if placed in carbon tetrachloride.

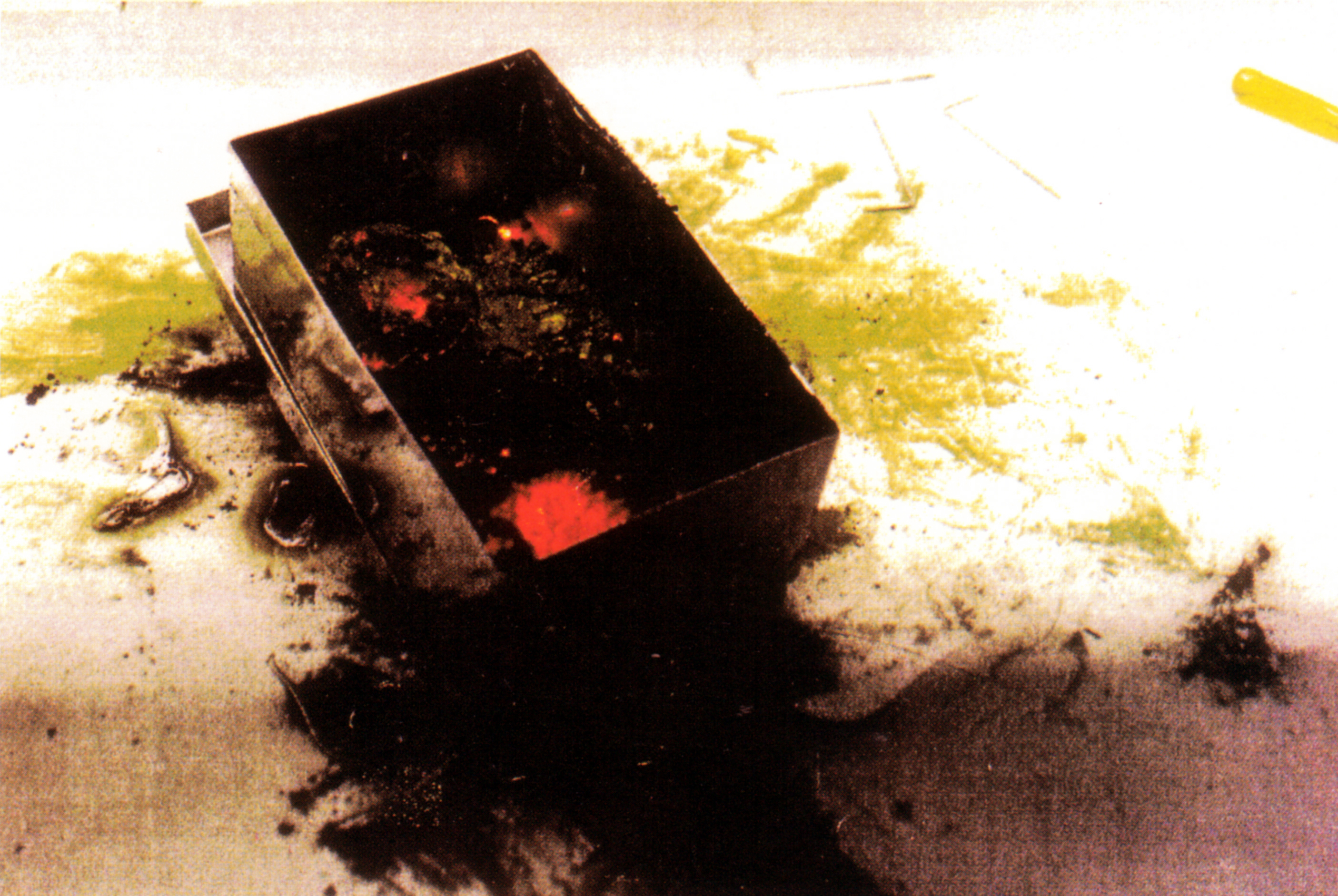
Plutonium pyrophoricity can cause it to look like a glowing ember under certain conditions.

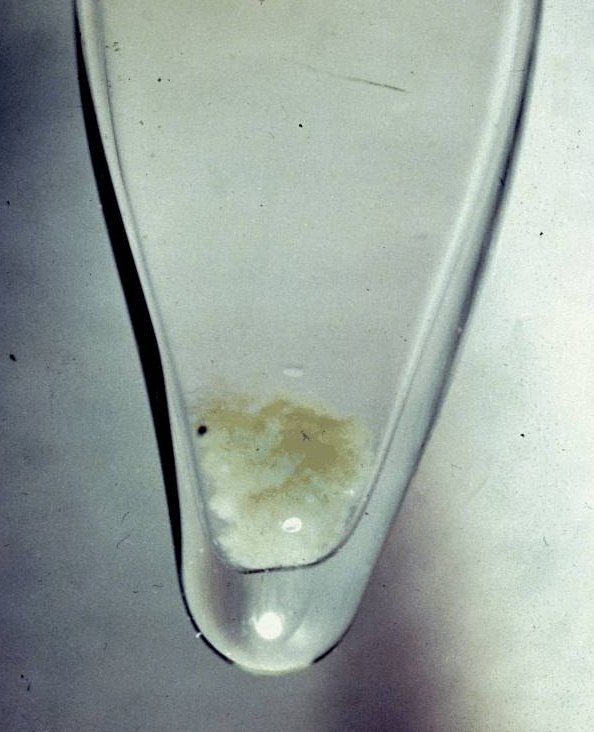
Twenty micrograms of pure plutonium hydroxide

Plutonium is a reactive metal. In moist air or moist argon, the metal oxidizes rapidly, producing a mixture of oxides and hydrides. If the metal is exposed long enough to a limited amount of water vapor, a powdery surface coating of PuO_{2} is formed. Also formed is plutonium hydride but an excess of water vapor forms only PuO_{2}.

Plutonium shows enormous, and reversible, reaction rates with pure hydrogen, forming plutonium hydride. It also reacts readily with oxygen, forming PuO and PuO_{2} as well as intermediate oxides; plutonium oxide fills 40% more volume than plutonium metal. The metal reacts with the halogens, see below. The following oxyhalides are observed: PuOF, PuOCl, PuOBr, and PuOI. It will react with carbon to form PuC, nitrogen to form PuN, and silicon to form PuSi_{2}.

Powders of plutonium, its hydrides and certain oxides like Pu_{2}O_{3} are pyrophoric, meaning they can ignite spontaneously at ambient temperature and are therefore handled in an inert, dry atmosphere of nitrogen or argon. Bulk plutonium ignites only when heated above 400 °C. Pu_{2}O_{3} spontaneously heats up and transforms into PuO_{2}, which is stable in dry air, but reacts with water vapor when heated.

Crucibles used to contain plutonium need to be able to withstand its strongly reducing properties. Refractory metals such as tantalum and tungsten along with the more stable oxides, borides, carbides, nitrides and silicides can tolerate this. Melting in an electric arc furnace can be used to produce small ingots of the metal without the need for a crucible.

Cerium is used as a chemical simulant of plutonium for development of containment, extraction, and other technologies.

== Halides ==
Plutonium reacts readily with halogens, forming halides of composition PuX_{3} (X=F, Cl, Br, I) or PuX_{4} (X=F). The higher plutonium fluorides PuF_{5} and PuF_{6} and the higher plutonium chloride PuCl_{4} are also known, though PuF_{5} and PuCl_{4} are only known in the gas phase. Several of these compounds form hydrates, with compositions PuF_{3}·0.40H_{2}O, PuF_{3}·0.75H_{2}O, PuF_{4}·2.5H_{2}O, PuCl_{3}·3H_{2}O, PuCl_{3}·6H_{2}O, and PuBr_{3}·6H_{2}O.

=== Fluorides ===
The compounds PuF_{3}, PuF_{4}, and PuF_{6} are well-characterized. The plutonium(III) fluoride hydrate PuF_{3}·0.75H_{2}O can be prepared from adding hydrofluoric acid to a plutonium(III) solution in nitric acid, from which it precipitates. The hydrate can then be converted to the anhydrous form by heating in hydrofluoric acid stream. However, this method for PuF_{3} production is not favored as it can lead to problems with filtration after the product is precipitated. Alternatively, it can be produced by reacting plutonium compounds, such as PuO_{2} or Pu_{2}(C_{2}O_{4})_{3} with gaseous fluorinating agents, such as HF, F_{2}, NF_{3}, ClF_{3}, or CCl_{2}F_{2}. This method also produces other plutonium fluorides, but these can be reduced to the trifluoride by action of reducing agents such as hydrogen gas. Due to the toxicity of these fluorinating agents, other methods have also been proposed, such as the reaction of plutonium dioxide with ammonium bifluoride. PuF_{3} is used to prepare plutonium metal, forming the metal on action by calcium and iodine.

As with PuF_{3}, a plutonium(IV) fluoride (PuF_{4}) hydrate, PuF_{4}·2.5H_{2}O, can be precipitated by hydrofluoric acid in aqueous solution. Surprisingly, however, decomposition of this compound in vacuum yields PuF_{3} instead of PuF_{4}. Like with PuF_{3}, though, it can be converted to PuF_{4} by heating in a stream of HF. It is most commonly produced by reacting plutonium dioxide with hydrofluoric acid at high temperatures with oxygen gas. Several other materials can be used in place of plutonium dioxide, like plutonium(IV) nitrate or plutonium peroxide. Anhydrous PuF_{4} adopts a polymeric structure, isostructural with uranium tetrafluoride. In addition to the anhydrous form, two distinct hydrates of PuF_{4} are known: the aforementioned PuF_{4}·2.5H_{2}O, and PuF_{4}·xH_{2}O (0.5 ≤ x ≤ 2.0). The hydrates are also isostructural to the corresponding uranium compounds. PuF_{4}·xH_{2}O (0.5 ≤ x ≤ 2.0) adopts a cubic structure, while PuF_{4}·2.5H_{2}O adopts an orthorhombic structure. PuF_{4} has been found to slowly age over time; a 30 year old sample of PuF_{4} was found to contain 88% anhydrous PuF_{4}, 8% PuF_{4}·1.6H_{2}O, and 4% PuO_{2}. It is an important intermediate in plutonium metal production.

Upon reaction with fluorine gas at high temperatures, PuF_{4} is oxidized to plutonium hexafluoride, PuF_{6}. It is also readily produced upon reaction with powerful fluorinating agents, like krypton difluoride and dioxygen difluoride. Unlike the related compound uranium hexafluoride, PuF_{6} is unstable and highly reactive. PuF_{6} solid is prone to radiolysis from alpha particles produced in the radioactive decay of plutonium, forming PuF_{4} and fluorine gas; however, gas phase reaches a stable equilibrium. It undergoes slow hydrolysis to plutonyl fluoride PuO_{2}F_{2}. In hydrofluoric acid solution, PuO_{2}F_{2} forms a hydrate, PuO_{2}F_{2}·H_{2}O, and a solid incorporating HF, PuO_{2}F_{2}·HF·4H_{2}O.

Plutonium also forms a few fluorides intermediate between PuF_{4} and PuF_{6}, namely plutonium(V) fluoride PuF_{5}, as well as the mixed-valent Pu_{4}F_{17}. Pu_{4}F_{17} is a brick-red solid formed during the production of PuF_{6}. PuF_{5} is a weakly-characterized compound only known in the gas phase.

=== Chlorides ===
The only stable binary plutonium chloride in the solid phase is plutonium(III) chloride, PuCl_{3}. It can be produced in several ways. For medium-scale reactions (between 1 and 10 grams), the best method of PuCl_{3} production is the action of hydrochloric acid on plutonium(III) oxalate. Plutonium(III) oxalate can also be converted to plutonium(III) chloride by action of hexachloropropene. Analytically pure samples of PuCl_{3} can be created by reacting plutonium(IV) oxide prepared by calcination of plutonium(IV) oxalate with phosgene or carbon tetrachloride at elevated temperatures (>500 °C). PuCl_{3} has been determined to adopt the uranium(III) chloride-type structure. In addition to anhydrous PuCl_{3}, multiple hydrates are also known, with compositions PuCl_{3}·3H_{2}O and PuCl_{3}·6H_{2}O. PuCl_{3}·6H_{2}O, which can be synthesized by evaporating HCl solutions, adopts the GdCl_{3}·6H_{2}O-type structure, (Note: PuCl_{3}·6H_{2}O is known to be isostructural with SmCl_{3}·6H_{2}O, which adopts the GdCl_{3}·6H_{2}O-type structure.) consisting of PuCl_{2}(H_{2}O)^{+}_{6} cations which are linked by chloride anions. It melts in its own waters of crystallization at 94 °C. PuCl_{3}·3H_{2}O is isostructural with NdCl_{3}·3H_{2}O.

While it does not exist as a solid, dissociating into plutonium(III) chloride and chlorine gas, binary plutonium tetrachloride is known in the gas phase, and it forms several stable adducts, such as with dimethoxyethane or diphenylsulfoxide. Plutonium tetrachloride gas is formed from the reaction of plutonium(III) chloride with chlorine gas at high temperatures, enhancing the volatility of the product. The dimethoxyethane adduct, PuCl_{4}(DME)_{2} (DME=dimethoxyethane), can be prepared by evaporating a plutonium(IV) solution in HCl, adding the residue to a solution of DME, and then adding (CH_{3})_{3}SiCl. This adduct can be used to prepare other compounds. For example, when it is dissolved in tetrahydrofuran, it forms the mixed-valence complex [Pu^{III}Cl_{2}(thf)_{5}]^{+}[Pu^{IV}Cl_{5}(thf)]^{−} (THF=tetrahydrofuran).

Despite solid PuCl_{4} being unknown, several stable solid plutonium(IV) chlorides derived from PuCl_{4}, such as the hexachloroplutonates, are well-characterized. The hexachloroplutonate ion (PuCl^{2−}_{6}) is the dominant plutonium species in concentrated hydrochloric acid, and several compounds are known containing this ion. Dicaesium hexachloroplutonate (Cs_{2}PuCl_{6}) can be precipitated from concentrated HCl solution by the addition of caesium chloride. Cs_{2}PuCl_{6} can be used to prepare other plutonium compounds, such as the cyclopentadienide complex (η^{5}-C_{5}H_{5})_{3}PuCl. Other hexachloroplutonates are also known, such as K_{2}PuCl_{6}, Rb_{2}PuCl_{6}, (N(CH_{3})_{4})_{2}PuCl_{6}, and (N(C_{2}H_{5})_{4})_{2}PuCl_{6}.

=== Bromides ===
The only stable compound in the plutonium-bromine system is PuBr_{3}. It is formed via several methods, the two best ones being direct synthesis from plutonium and bromine, and reaction of plutonium hydride with hydrobromic acid. It is also prepared by the hydrobromination of various plutonium compounds, like Pu_{2}(C_{2}O_{4})_{3}, PuCl_{3}, and PuBr_{3}·6H_{2}O, vacuum decomposition of PuBr_{3}·6H_{2}O, or reaction of Pu(OH)_{4} with bromine. Its structure, termed the PuBr_{3} structure, consists of PuBr_{8} polyhedra, where plutonium has a coordination geometry of bicapped trigonal prismatic, which link together to form infinite chains. A hydrate of plutonium(III) bromide, PuBr_{3}·6H_{2}O, is also known, and is formed from plutonium bromide solutions containing water. Its structure consists of the complex [PuBr_{2}(H_{2}O)_{6}]^{+}, and is isostructural with GdCl_{3}·6H_{2}O. It also forms a complex with tetrahydrofuran, PuBr_{3}(THF)_{4} (THF=tetrahydrofuran), which can be formed by reacting plutonium and bromine in THF solution, though the hexahydrate is formed if water is present in the THF solution. The THF complex is used in the synthesis of other plutonium compounds.

A few plutonium bromide complexes are known containing plutonium(IV). Plutonium tetrabromide forms stable complexes with hexamethylphosphoramide (PuBr_{4}·2[(CH_{3})_{2}N]_{3}PO) triphenylphosphine oxide (PuBr_{4}·2(C_{6}H_{5})_{3}PO), and tricyclohexylphosphine oxide (PuBr_{4}·2(C_{6}H_{11})_{3}PO), as well as an unstable complex with acetonitrile (PuBr_{4}·4CH_{3}CN), which decomposes to a plutonium(III) compound. The plutonium(IV) complex ion PuBr^{2−}_{6} is also known, found in the tetraethylammonium salt [(C_{2}H_{5})_{4}N]_{2}PuBr_{6}.

=== Iodides ===
Plutonium(III) iodide can be prepared by reacting plutonium metal with either hydroiodic acid or mercury(II) iodide. It is extremely moisture-sensitive, and when even traces of water are present in its formation conditions, plutonium oxyiodide, PuOI, is formed instead. It adopts the PuBr_{3}-type structure. Several plutonium triiodide complexes are known, such as PuI_{3}(THF)_{4} (THF=tetrahydrofuran), PuI_{3}(DMSO)_{4} (DMSO=dimethylsulfoxide), and PuI_{3}(py)_{4} (py=pyridine). These complexes can be formed by reacting plutonium metal with iodine in tetrahydrofuran, dimethylsulfoxide, or pyridine solutions, respectively. PuI_{3} is a poorly characterized solid.

== Organoplutonium compounds ==
The organometallic chemistry of plutonium complexes is typical for organoactinide species; a characteristic example of an organoplutonium compound is plutonocene. It is synthesized from the reaction of tetraethylammonium hexachloroplutonate(IV) ([N(C_{2}H_{5})_{4}]_{2}PuCl_{6}) with dipotassium cyclooctatetraenide (K_{2}(C_{8}H_{8})) in THF at room temperature. It is a dark red, very air-sensitive solid that is sparingly soluble in toluene and chlorocarbons. Computational chemistry methods indicate an enhanced covalent character in the plutonium-ligand bonding. Plutonium forms a sandwich complex with 1,4-bis(trimethylsilyl)cyclooctatetraenyl (1,4-COT’’) and its 1,3 isomer. This compound is prepared by the oxidation of the anionic green Pu(III) complex Li(THF)_{4}[Pu(1,4-COT’’)_{2}] with cobalt(II) chloride which leads to the formation of Pu(1,4-COT’’)(1,3-COT’’). The reaction is easily noticeable by the THF solution changing to a dark red colour, characteristic of Pu(IV).

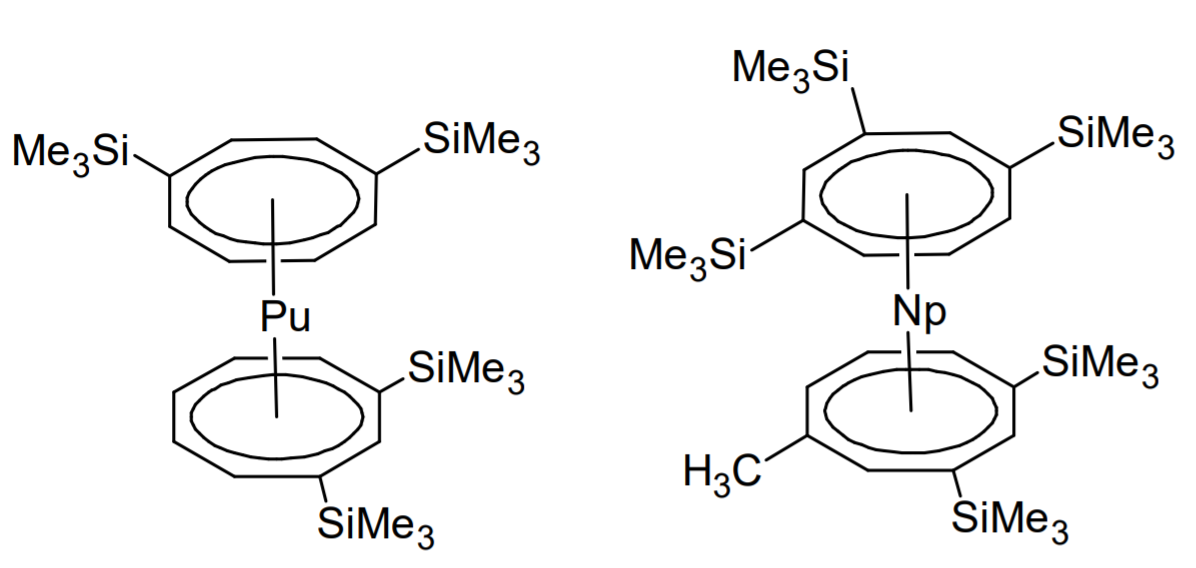
The structure of Pu(3-COT’’)(4-COT’’) (left)

Plutonium can form a cyclopentadienyl complex PuCp_{3}, produced from the reaction of plutonium(III) chloride and beryllocene. It is green, with structure similar to the related uranium and neptunium complexes. The formal +2 oxidation state of plutonium is known in the complex [K(2.2.2-cryptand)] [Pu^{II}Cp″_{3}], Cp″ = C_{5}H_{3}(SiMe_{3})_{2}.

== See also ==
- Uranium compounds
- Neptunium compounds
- Americium compounds
- Samarium compounds
