= Plutonium(III) oxalate =

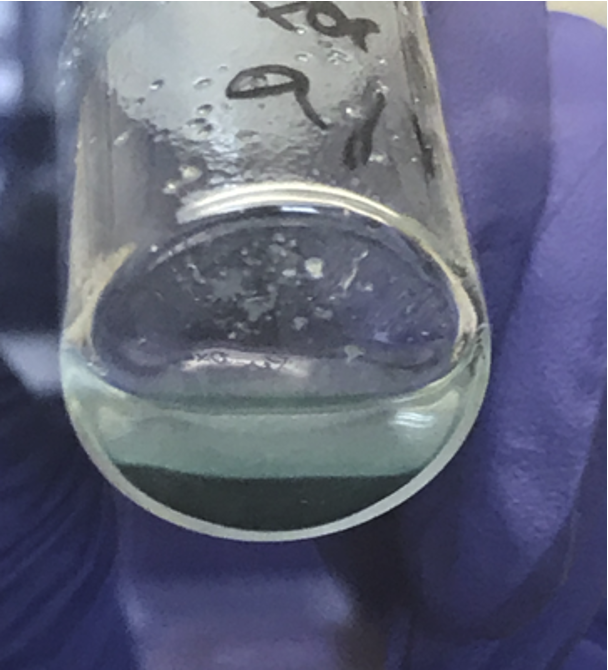
- Plutonium(III) oxalate hydrate

Names
- IUPAC name Plutonium(III) oxalate

Identifiers
CAS Number	56609-10-0 (anhydrous)
3D model (JSmol)	Interactive image
- InChI: InChI=1S/3C2H2O4.2Pu/c3*3-1(4)2(5)6;;/h3*(H,3,4)(H,5,6);;/q;;;2*+3/p-6 Key: PHGVNOKIRFLVGH-UHFFFAOYSA-H
- SMILES: C(=O)(C(=O)[O-])[O-].C(=O)(C(=O)[O-])[O-].C(=O)(C(=O)[O-])[O-].[Pu+3].[Pu+3]

Properties
Chemical formula	Pu_{2}(C_{2}O_{4})_{3}·xH_{2}O (0 ≤ x ≤ 10.5)
Appearance	Turquoise-blue solid
Melting point	225 °C (437 °F; 498 K) (anhydrous; decomposes)
Solubility in water	Highly insoluble

Structure (Note: This data is reported for the nonahydrate, Pu_{2}(C_{2}O_{4})_{3}·9H_{2}O.)
Crystal structure	monoclinic
Space group	P2_{1}/c
Lattice constant	a = 11.246 Å, b = 9.610 Å, c = 10.315 Å α = 90.00°, β = 114.477°, γ = 90.00°
Lattice volume (V)	1014.6 Å^{3}
Formula units (Z)	4

Related compounds
Other anions	Plutonium(III) carbonate
Other cations	Americium(III) oxalate Curium(III) oxalate
Related plutonium oxalates	Plutonium(IV) oxalate Plutonyl oxalate
- Except where otherwise noted, data are given for materials in their standard state (at 25 °C [77 °F], 100 kPa). Infobox references

Plutonium(III) oxalate is a chemical compound consisting of plutonium(III) (Pu^{3+}) and oxalate (C_{2}O^{2−}_{4}) ions, with the anhydrous form having a chemical formula Pu_{2}(C_{2}O_{4})_{3}. It forms hydrates, which have a formula of Pu_{2}(C_{2}O_{4})_{3}·xH_{2}O (0 ≤ x ≤ 10.5), with the form with 9 ≤ x ≤ 10.5 being most commonly produced under standard conditions. The structure of this hydrate has been characterized through X-ray diffraction, showing it forms honeycomb-like layers. Like all plutonium compounds, it is radioactive.

Plutonium(III) oxalate is produced by adding oxalic acid (H_{2}C_{2}O_{4}) to solutions containing plutonium(III), but due to plutonium(III)'s instability towards oxidation, reducing agents have to be added for stabilization. At high temperatures, the compound decomposes, going through several different phases before arriving at plutonium(IV) oxide (PuO_{2}). Because of this, it is used for the production of plutonium(IV) oxide, along with the related compound plutonium(IV) oxalate (Pu(C_{2}O_{4})_{2}). Other plutonium compounds can also be made with plutonium(III) oxalate, like plutonium(III) fluoride (PuF_{3}) or plutonium(III) chloride (PuCl_{3}).

== History ==
Plutonium(III) oxalate has been used since the Manhattan Project to precipitate plutonium as a salt. The instability of plutonium's +3 oxidation state has made it difficult to prepare for applications such as production of plutonium(IV) oxide, for which plutonium(IV) oxalate has been used instead. However, a 1965 report provided methods to prepare plutonium(III) oxalate using ascorbic acid to achieve the necessary oxidation state.

== Synthesis ==
The synthesis of plutonium(III) oxalate requires an acidic solution containing plutonium ions. To set plutonium in the +3 oxidation state, reducing agents have to be applied, as plutonium(III) is unstable and susceptible to oxidation. An oxidation inhibitor has to be added as well to prevent formation of oxidizing agents that could potentially re-oxidize the reducing agents or plutonium(III). After the plutonium(III) solution has been prepared, the slow addition of oxalic acid precipitates highly insoluble plutonium(III) oxalate hydrates with very low losses, which can easily be filtered:

2 Pu^{3+} (aq) + 3 H_{2}C_{2}O_{4} + x H_{2}O → Pu_{2}(C_{2}O_{4})_{3}·xH_{2}O ↓ + 6 H^{+} (9 ≤ x ≤ 10.5)

The initial solution is usually a nitric acid solution prepared via ion exchange, but hydrochloric acid (HCl) and sulfamic acid (H_{3}NSO_{3}) solutions can be used as well, which are prepared by dissolving plutonium metal in the respective acid. For reducing agents, ascorbic acid (C_{6}H_{8}O_{6}) is often used as it has been found to quickly reduce plutonium:

2 Pu^{4+} + H_{2}A → 2 Pu^{3+} + A + 2 H^{+} (Note: Here, H_{2}A represents ascorbic acid, and A represents dehydroascorbic acid, (C_{6}H_{6}O_{6}). The reduction from Pu(IV) to Pu(III) is assumed to have the same reaction as the ascorbic acid reduction of other metals, as given by.)

Other agents like hydroxylamine (NH_{2}OH) can be added as well. For oxidation inhibitors, sulfamic acid or hydrazine (N_{2}H_{4}) can be used.

== Properties ==
=== Structure ===
While the structure of anhydrous plutonium(III) oxalate is unknown, two possible structures have been predicted with density functional theory calculations. One structure consists of plutonium-oxalate layers in a honeycomb-like arrangement, and the other consists of 2D sheets which are connected into a 3D network via bridging oxalate groups. Both of these structures have been calculated to be stable.

On the other hand, the structure of the plutonium(III) oxalate hydrate is known, and has been characterized through X-ray diffraction. It has been determined to adopt the same structure as lanthanum(III) oxalate decahydrate, La_{2}(C_{2}O_{4})_{3}·10H_{2}O. It is made up of repeating honeycomb-like layers of composition Pu_{2}(C_{2}O_{4})_{3}(H_{2}O)_{6}. Within these layers, each plutonium(III) center is chelated (bonded with as to form a ring) by three oxalate ions and coordinated by three water molecules, having a coordination geometry of tricapped trigonal prismatic. A variable amount of water molecules lie between these layers, depending on exact synthesis conditions. The hydration number ranges between 9 and 10.5 water molecules per formula unit, although this form is sometimes referred to as the decahydrate.

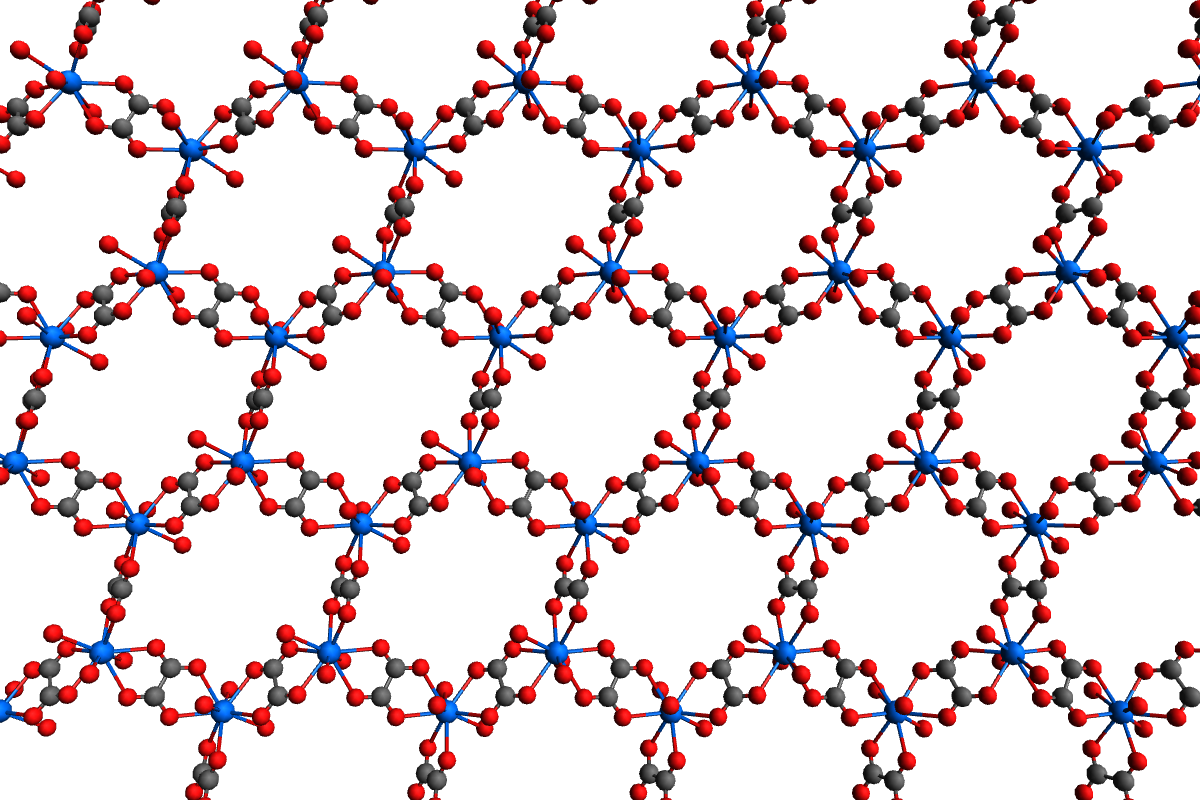
A single [Pu_{2}(C_{2}O_{4})_{3}(H_{2}O)_{6}]_{n} layer in plutonium(III) oxalate hydrate. Blue is plutonium, grey is carbon, and red is oxygen. Hydrogen atoms are omitted.

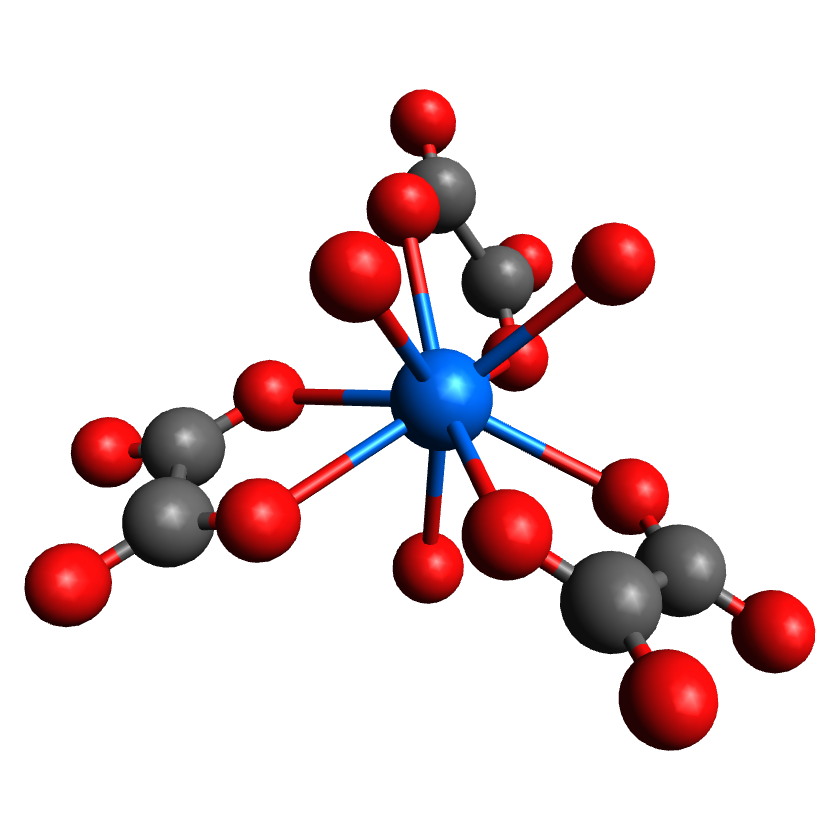
Zoom-in on the coordination sphere of a single plutonium atom within the layers. Blue is plutonium, grey is carbon, and red is oxygen. Hydrogen atoms are omitted.

=== Decomposition ===
Data on the thermal decomposition of plutonium(III) oxalate is reported for the nonahydrate (Pu_{2}(C_{2}O_{4})_{3}·9H_{2}O). Upon heating in air, it loses water between 30 and 225 °C, becoming an octahydrate, dihydrate, and monohydrate before reaching anhydrous plutonium(III) oxalate (Pu_{2}(C_{2}O_{4})_{3}). Starting at 225 °C, Pu_{2}(C_{2}O_{4})_{3} begins to decompose to plutonium(IV) oxide, PuO_{2}, though complete conversion only occurs between 400 °C and 450 °C. The transition from Pu_{2}(C_{2}O_{4})_{3} to PuO_{2} goes through several phases, with compositions Pu_{2}(C_{2}O_{4})_{2}CO_{3}, Pu_{2}C_{2}O_{4}(CO_{3})_{2}, and PuOCO_{3}.

Diagram of the reactions that occur during the dehydration of plutonium(III) oxalate at high temperatures.

The thermal decomposition follows a different pathway in argon. The process starts from the heptahydrate, Pu_{2}(C_{2}O_{4})_{3}·7H_{2}O, which loses water to transform into Pu_{2}(C_{2}O_{4})_{3}·2H_{2}O at 80–135 °C, Pu_{2}(C_{2}O_{4})_{3}·H_{2}O at 135–160 °C, and Pu_{2}(C_{2}O_{4})_{3} at 160–275 °C. This compound is converted to PuO_{2} between 275 and 700 °C.

At room temperature in air, plutonium(III) oxalate also decomposes, albeit much more slowly. After approximately 20 weeks it decomposes into PuOCO_{3}, and over a period of a few months to years converts at least partially to PuO_{2}. Comparisons of the decomposition of the related compound plutonium(IV) oxalate with different isotopes of plutonium suggest that oxidation by air is the driving force behind this decomposition. However, the splitting apart of the waters of crystallization by alpha particles occurs as a secondary decomposition mechanism with more radioactive isotopes of plutonium like plutonium-240.

== Uses ==
Plutonium(III) oxalate is frequently used as a starting material for the preparation of other plutonium compounds. For example, plutonium(IV) oxide is mainly produced by the high-temperature heating of either plutonium(III) oxalate or the related compound plutonium(IV) oxalate. During this process, it is slowly heated up to 700 °C to avoid rapid decomposition and evolution of gases, and afterwards it is heated to 1000 °C to remove any carbon left behind. In addition, plutonium(III) oxalate has been used to synthesize plutonium(III) perrhenate, via reaction with rhenium(VII) oxide.

=== Halide production ===
Plutonium(III) oxalate can also be used to produce plutonium halides. The compound plutonium(III) fluoride has been prepared at the 150–300 gram scale by heating plutonium(III) oxalate in a stream of hydrogen between 150 and 600 °C, and then in a stream of hydrogen fluoride between 200 and 300 °C:

Pu_{2}(C_{2}O_{4})_{3} + 6 HF → 2 PuF_{3} + 3 CO + 3 CO_{2} + 3 H_{2}O

Plutonium(III) oxalate as a hydrate can also be used to prepare plutonium(III) chloride (PuCl_{3}) by reaction with chlorinating agents. Reaction with hydrogen chloride is considered the best method for PuCl_{3} for medium-scale reactions (between 1 and 10 grams):

Pu_{2}(C_{2}O_{4})_{3}·10H_{2}O + 6 HCl → 2 PuCl_{3} + 3 CO_{2} + 3 CO + 13 H_{2}O

Alternatively, the liquid hexachloropropene can be used as a chlorinating agent to avoid working with hazardous gases:

Pu_{2}(C_{2}O_{4})_{3}·10H_{2}O + 3 C_{3}Cl_{6} → 2 PuCl_{3} + 3 C_{3}Cl_{4}O + 3 CO_{2} + 3 CO + 10 H_{2}O

To prepare plutonium(III) bromide (PuBr_{3}), it can be reacted with hydrogen bromide (HBr) between 400 and 600 °C.
