= Plutonium(III) chloride =

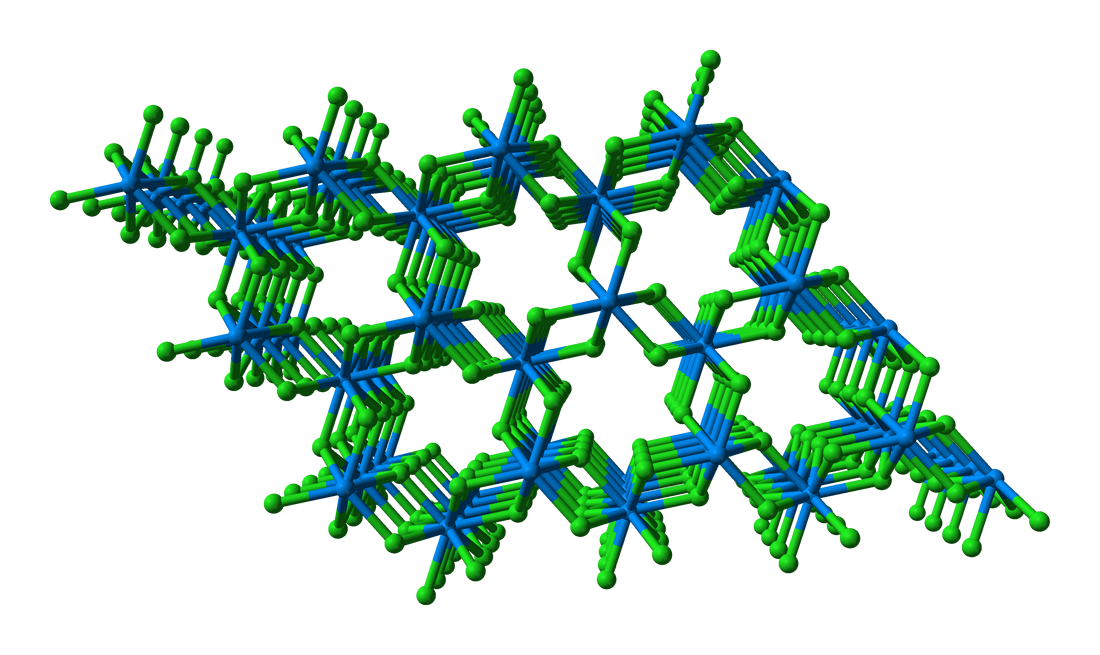
- Ball-and-stick model of the crystal structure of plutonium(III) chloride

Names
- IUPAC name Plutonium(III) chloride
- Other names Plutonium trichloride

Identifiers
CAS Number	13569-62-5
3D model (JSmol)	Interactive image
ChemSpider	14483818
PubChem CID	19902959
CompTox Dashboard (EPA)	DTXSID90601161
- InChI: InChI=1S/3ClH.Pu/h3*1H;/q;;;+3/p-3 Key: CYMMZQWRMUVJRR-UHFFFAOYSA-K; InChI=1S/3ClH.Pu/h3*1H;/q;;;+3/p-3 Key: CYMMZQWRMUVJRR-DFZHHIFOAR; Key: CYMMZQWRMUVJRR-UHFFFAOYSA-K
- SMILES: [Pu+3].[Cl-].[Cl-].[Cl-]

Properties
Chemical formula	PuCl_{3}
Molar mass	350 g·mol^{−1}
Appearance	Green solid
Density	5.71 g/cm^{3}, solid
Melting point	767 °C (1,413 °F; 1,040 K)
Boiling point	1,767 °C (3,213 °F; 2,040 K)

Related compounds
Other anions	Plutonium(III) fluoride Plutonium(III) bromide Plutonium(III) iodide
Other cations	Samarium(III) chloride
Related plutonium chlorides	Plutonium(IV) chloride
- Except where otherwise noted, data are given for materials in their standard state (at 25 °C [77 °F], 100 kPa). verify (what is ?) Infobox references

Plutonium(III) chloride or plutonium trichloride is an inorganic compound of plutonium and chlorine with the chemical formula PuCl_{3}. It is the only stable solid chloride of plutonium, though another plutonium chloride, plutonium tetrachloride, is known in the gas phase. It can exist as an anhydrous solid (containing no water), or in the form of hydrates (solids containing water), such as the hexahydrate, PuCl_{3}·6H_{2}O. It is used in the processing of plutonium metal and in molten-salt reactors.

Plutonium(III) chloride can be synthesized through a variety of reactions, many involving the reaction of other plutonium compounds, such as plutonium(III) oxalate (Pu_{2}(C_{2}O_{4})_{3}), plutonium(IV) oxide (PuO_{2}), or plutonium hydride (PuH_{x}), with chlorinating agents like hydrogen chloride (HCl), hexachloropropene (C_{3}Cl_{6}), phosgene (COCl_{2}), carbon tetrachloride (CCl_{4}), or chlorine gas (Cl_{2}). The structure of both anhydrous plutonium(III) chloride and PuCl_{3}·6H_{2}O are known.

== Synthesis ==
Multiple different methods have been used to synthesize plutonium(III) chloride, which all involve the chlorination of plutonium or plutonium compounds. Many of these methods also use plutonium(III) oxalate, which can be prepared by carefully adding oxalic acid to an acidic plutonium(III) solution, resulting in the decahydrate, Pu_{2}(C_{2}O_{4})_{3}·10H_{2}O. Purification of PuCl_{3} is achieved through sublimation, just as in other lanthanide and actinide trihalides.

=== Using hydrogen chloride ===
For medium-scale reactions (between 1 and 10 grams), the best method of preparing plutonium(III) chloride is by reacting plutonium(III) oxalate with hydrogen chloride, HCl:

Pu_{2}(C_{2}O_{4})_{3}·10H_{2}O + 6 HCl → 2 PuCl_{3} + 3 CO_{2} + 3 CO + 13 H_{2}O

For processing 100 gram quantities of plutonium, it can be converted to plutonium hydride which is reacted with hydrogen chloride in a fluidized bed reactor at 450 °C. To remove oxychlorides, the resulting PuCl_{3} is melted at 800 °C and sparged with HCl for 45 minutes.

Plutonium(III) chloride can also be formed from an aqueous solution of hydrogen chloride (hydrochloric acid) containing plutonium(III). Upon evaporation of the HCl solution, a residue of plutonium(III) chloride hexahydrate, PuCl_{3}·6H_{2}O, is formed. The hexahydrate can then be dehydrated in a stream of HCl to give the anhydrous solid PuCl_{3}.

Hydrogen chloride corrodes plutonium metal, forming plutonium(III) chloride as a thin surface layer:

2 Pu + 6 HCl → 2 PuCl_{3} + 3 H_{2}

=== Using hexachloropropene ===
Due to the difficulty in handling hazardous gases, hexachloropropene (C_{3}Cl_{6}) is used as a chlorinating agent instead of more dangerous compounds. Plutonium(III) oxalate (Pu_{2}(C_{2}O_{4})_{3}) has been used as an efficient initial source of plutonium. To produce plutonium(III) chloride, Pu_{2}(C_{2}O_{4})_{3} is heated with C_{3}Cl_{6}:

Pu_{2}(C_{2}O_{4})_{3}·10H_{2}O + 3 C_{3}Cl_{6} → 2 PuCl_{3} + 3 C_{3}Cl_{4}O + 3 CO_{2} + 3 CO + 10 H_{2}O

=== Using chlorine gas ===
Plutonium(III) chloride can be produced via reacting plutonium metal with chlorine gas at temperatures between 300 °C and 500 °C, followed by sublimation at 600–800 °C. Chlorine is used to chlorinate plutonium(IV) oxide (PuO_{2}) in the carbochlorination process, in which carbon is used as a reducing agent:

2 PuO_{2} + 3 C + 3 Cl_{2} → 2 PuCl_{3} + 2 CO + CO_{2}

=== Using other gaseous chlorinating agents ===
Plutonium(IV) oxide (PuO_{2}) can also be chlorinated with phosgene (COCl_{2}) or carbon tetrachloride above 500 °C, yielding analytically pure samples of PuCl_{3}. This method has been used at Los Alamos National Laboratory. One method for the continuous production of PuCl_{3} using phosgene is as follows: Plutonium(IV) oxalate hydrate (Pu(C_{2}O_{4})_{2}·6H_{2}O) is precipitated from plutonium(IV) solution, dried, and calcined (heated to decomposition without oxygen) to form plutonium(IV) oxide (PuO_{2}). The resulting PuO_{2} is then heated with phosgene in a tube furnace at 500 °C. This method produces plutonium at a rate of 250 grams / hour.

=== Using ammonium chloride ===
To ensure a high-purity product, plutonium(III) chloride can be prepared by reacting plutonium metal with ammonium chloride at high temperatures. The ammonium chloride sublimes, producing ammonia (NH_{3}) and hydrogen chloride. The hydrogen chloride subsequently reacts with the plutonium metal to form PuCl_{3}:

2 Pu + 6 NH_{4}Cl → 2 PuCl_{3} + 6 NH_{3} + 3 H_{2}

== Properties ==
The color of plutonium(III) chloride depends on its method of production. Plutonium(III) chloride produced via dehydration of the hexahydrate is slate-blue, while when prepared by one of the anhydrous methods the compound is blue-green to emerald green. When condensated from the gas phase, it appears as an emerald green solid. It is significantly hygroscopic, and is readily hydrated by atmospheric moisture, requiring it to be kept in an controlled, dehumidified atmosphere. Its hydration by atmospheric moisture leads to the formation of several hydrates, or compounds containing water. These include the monohydrate (PuCl_{3}·H_{2}O), dihydrate (PuCl_{3}·2H_{2}O), and hexahydrate (PuCl_{3}·6H_{2}O). Which hydrate is formed depends on the partial pressure of water in the atmosphere. Plutonium(III) chloride hexahydrate has a melting point of 94 °C, at which it melts in its own waters of crystallization, forming a solution. In a vacuum at 27 °C, it decomposes to give the monohydrate, and upon heating between 400 and 520 °C, it gives plutonium oxychloride, PuOCl.

It is the only stable solid binary chloride of plutonium, but other chlorides are known in the gas phase. When heated with chlorine at high temperatures, plutonium(III) chloride reacts to form the compound plutonium tetrachloride, increasing its volatility. Upon condensing, it reverts to PuCl_{3}.

2 PuCl_{3} + Cl_{2} ⇌ 2 PuCl_{4}

PuCl_{3} is also antiferromagnetic below temperatures of around 4.5 K.

=== Structure ===
Anhydrous PuCl_{3} is isostructural with (has the same structure as) the related uranium(III) chloride, UCl_{3}, having a hexagonal structure. Each plutonium atom is surrounded by nine chlorine atoms. Six of the nine chlorine atoms form a triangular prism, which have Pu-Cl bond lengths of 2.886 Å. Each of three rectangular sides of the triangular prism are capped off by chlorine atoms, which have Pu-Cl distances of 2.919 Å. This gives each plutonium atom a coordination geometry of tricapped trigonal prismatic. The prisms' triangular bases connect to form infinite chains. This structure is related to the structures of plutonium(III) bromide (PuBr_{3}) and plutonium(III) iodide (PuI_{3}); however, one of the three bromine or iodine atoms that would have capped off one of the rectangular sides of the triangular prism is too far away from the plutonium atom to bond. Unlike in PuBr_{3}, where the Pu-Br bonds are predominantly covalent, the Pu-Cl bonds within PuCl_{3} are predominantly ionic.

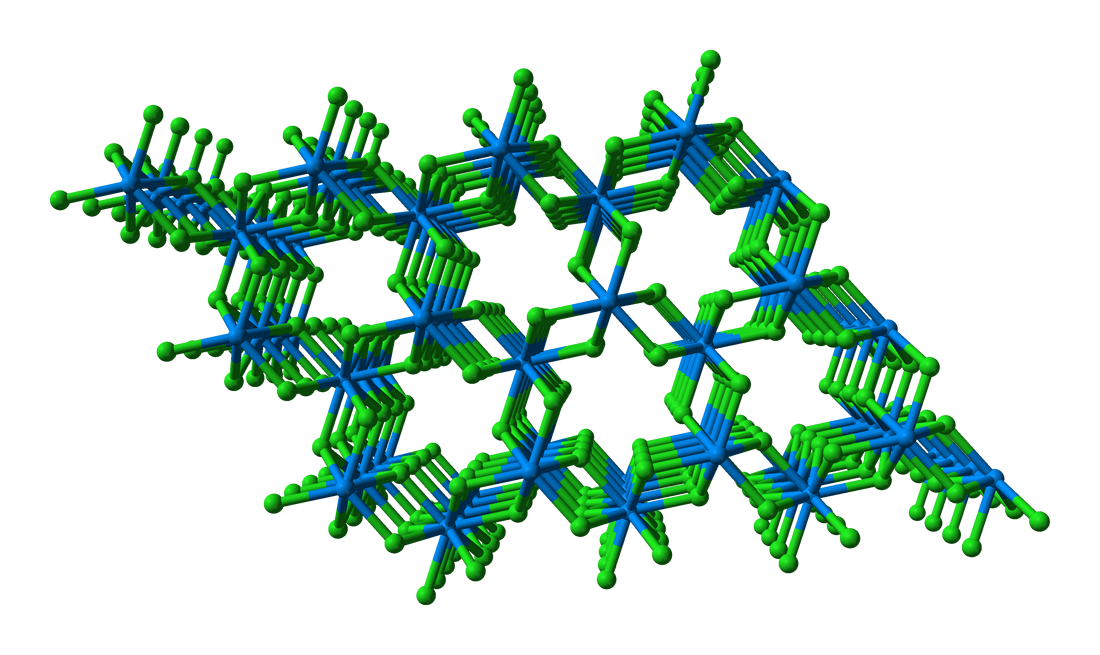
The crystal structure of PuCl_{3}. Blue is plutonium, green is chlorine.

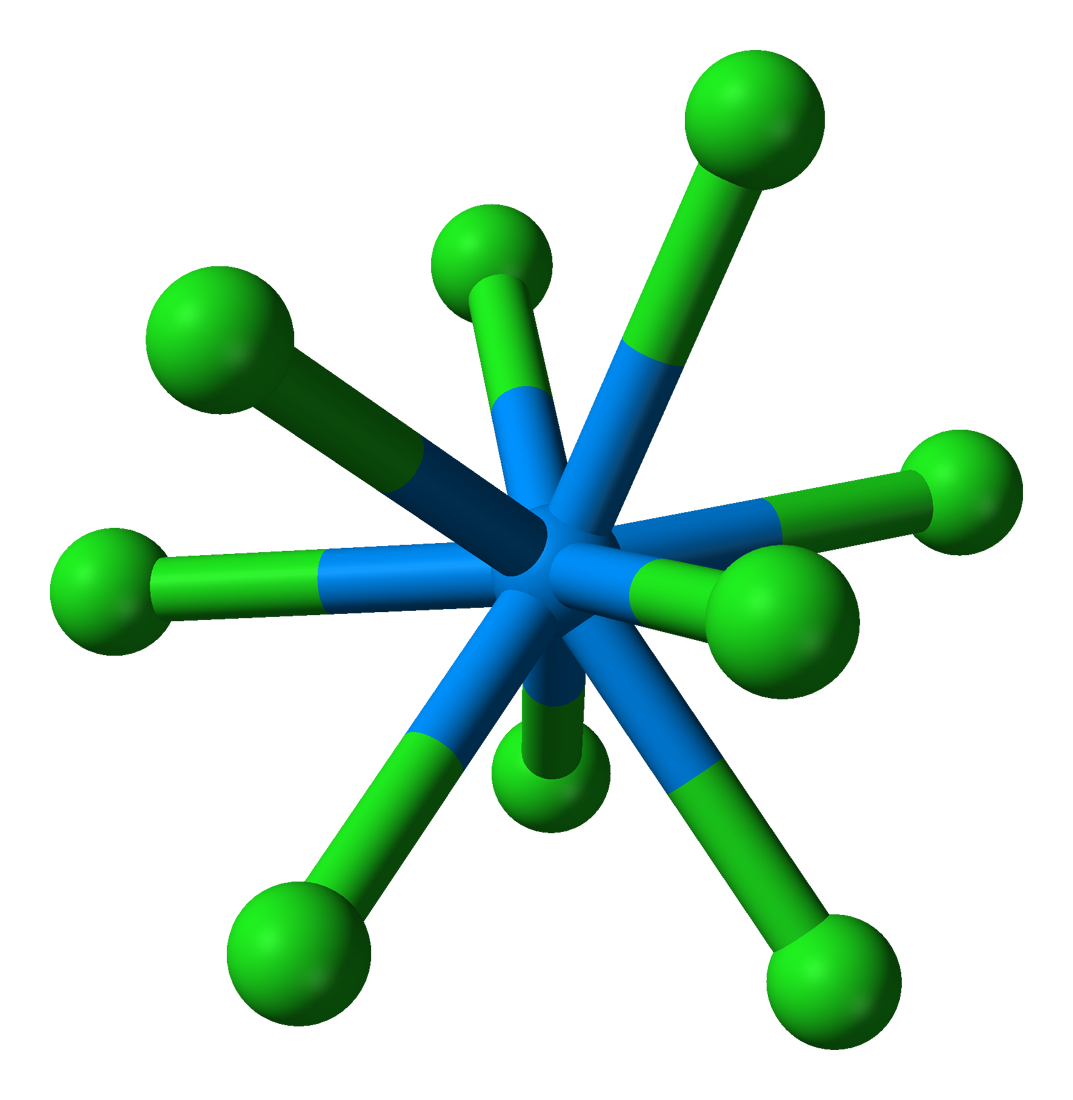
The coordination sphere of each plutonium atom in the structure of PuCl_{3}. Blue is plutonium, green is chlorine.

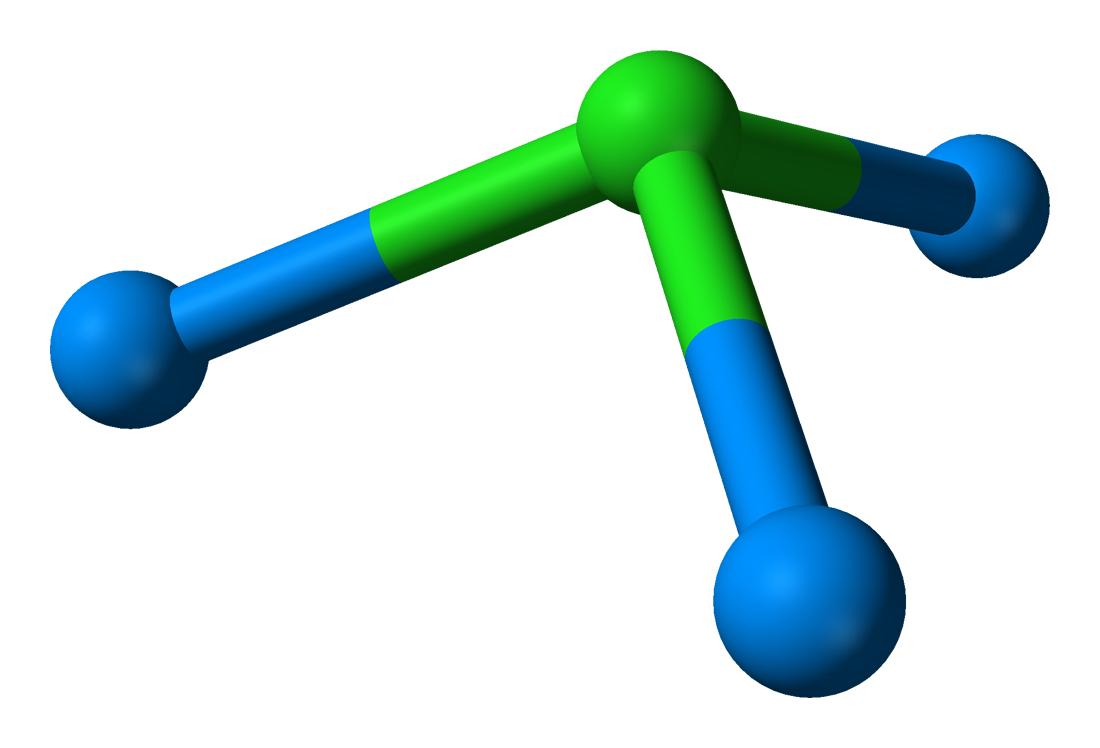
The coordination sphere of each chlorine atom in the structure of PuCl_{3}. Blue is plutonium, green is chlorine.

Plutonium(III) chloride hexahydrate, PuCl_{3}·6H_{2}O, adopts the GdCl_{3}·6H_{2}O-type structure, (Note: PuCl_{3}·6H_{2}O is known to be isostructural with SmCl_{3}·6H_{2}O, which adopts the GdCl_{3}·6H_{2}O-type structure.) which is seen across all the lanthanide chlorides except those of lanthanum (LaCl_{3}) and cerium (CeCl_{3}). In this structure, each plutonium atom is bonded to six water ligands and two chloride ligands, forming monomeric PuCl_{2}(H_{2}O)^{+}_{6} groups. The PuCl_{2}(H_{2}O)^{+}_{6} groups are linked together by chloride ions via hydrogen bonding.

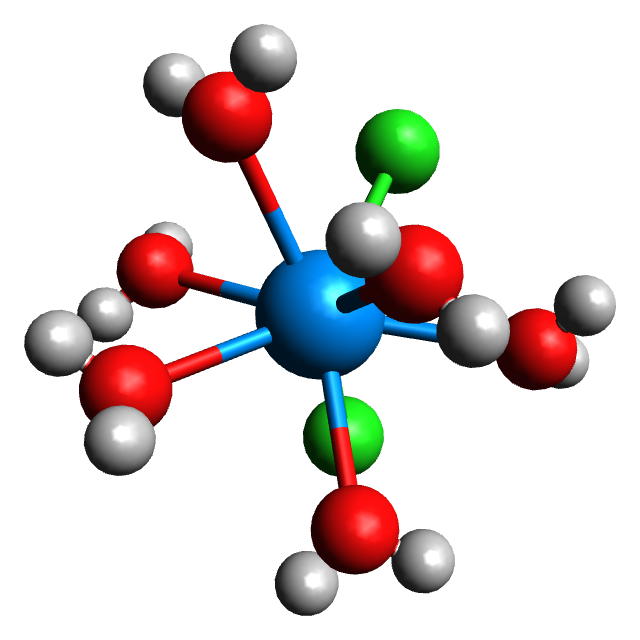
A model of the PuCl_{2}(H_{2}O)^{+}_{6} ion, as found in the structure of PuCl_{3}·6H_{2}O. Blue is plutonium, green is chloride, red is oxygen, and white is hydrogen.

Plutonium(III) chloride trihydrate (PuCl_{3}·3H_{2}O) adopts the same structure as the corresponding neodymium compound, NdCl_{3}·3H_{2}O.

== Uses ==
=== Plutonium metal processing ===
Plutonium(III) chloride is an intermediate in the production of plutonium metal. Plutonium metal produced from the reduction of plutonium tetrafluoride and plutonium(IV) oxide can be impure, notably with americium (Am) created via the beta decay of plutonium-241. To separate americium impurities from plutonium, the impure plutonium metal is placed in a mixture of molten magnesium chloride (MgCl_{2}), sodium chloride, and potassium chloride. Plutonium(III) chloride is produced when plutonium metal is oxidized by the magnesium chloride, but is subsequently reduced back to plutonium metal by americium. The reactions that occur are:

2 Am + 3 MgCl_{2} → 2 AmCl_{3} + 3 Mg
2 Pu + 3 MgCl_{2} → 2 PuCl_{3} + 3 Mg
Am + PuCl_{3} → AmCl_{3} + Pu

After the americium is oxidized, the americium(III) chloride (AmCl_{3}) and molten salt mixture can be separated, leaving behind a plutonium metal button.

=== Molten-salt reactors ===
Plutonium(III) chloride is a common nuclear material for use in molten-salt reactors, reactors which use molten salts with actinides dissolved in them as their fuel, such as a mixture of sodium chloride and plutonium(III) chloride. Molten salts containing chlorides, like plutonium(III) chloride, are often used, as they have low melting points and can dissolve high concentrations of actinides.
