= Plutonium oxalate =

Plutonium oxalate can refer to:

- Plutonium(III) oxalate, Pu_{2}(C_{2}O_{4})_{3}
- Plutonium(IV) oxalate, Pu(C_{2}O_{4})_{2}
