= Plutonium tetrachloride =

Names
- IUPAC name Plutonium(IV) chloride

Identifiers
CAS Number	161280-01-9
3D model (JSmol)	Interactive image
CompTox Dashboard (EPA)	DTXSID90615460
- InChI: InChI=1S/4ClH.Pu/h4*1H;/q;;;;+4/p-4 Key: QNJPYBOCFFOTGM-UHFFFAOYSA-J
- SMILES: [Cl-].[Cl-].[Cl-].[Cl-].[Pu+4]

Properties
Chemical formula	PuCl_{4}
Molar mass	386 g·mol^{−1}

Related compounds
Other anions	Plutonium tetrafluoride
Other cations	Neptunium tetrachloride; Uranium tetrachloride
- Except where otherwise noted, data are given for materials in their standard state (at 25 °C [77 °F], 100 kPa). Infobox references

Plutonium tetrachloride or plutonium(IV) chloride is an inorganic compound of plutonium and chlorine with the chemical formula PuCl_{4}. While it is not known as a solid, gaseous PuCl_{4} is known. In addition, it is known to form several stable adducts. The dimethoxyethane adduct, PuCl_{4}(DME)_{2}, has been used as a precursor to other plutonium compounds.

== Synthesis ==
The compound is formed when plutonium trichloride is put in a stream of chlorine:

2 PuCl_{3} + Cl_{2} → 2 PuCl_{4}

== Physical properties ==
The compound is not stable as a solid; however, it is known in the gas phase. When condensed, it forms plutonium(III) chloride and chlorine gas:

2 PuCl_{4} → 2 PuCl_{3} + Cl_{2}

However, several stable adducts, such as with dimethoxyethane (PuCl_{4}(DME)_{2}) or diphenylsulfoxide, and ammoniates (solids incorporating ammonia), are known. The diphenylsulfoxide adduct appears as a red solid.

== Complexes ==
=== With dimethoxyethane ===
Plutonium tetrachloride forms a stable adduct with dimethoxyethane (CH_{3}OCH_{2}CH_{2}OCH_{3}) with formula PuCl_{4}(DME)_{2} (DME=dimethoxyethane). This compound can be prepared via evaporation of a hydrochloric acid solution containing plutonium(IV), adding the product to dimethoxyethane, and then adding trimethylsilyl chloride. This adduct can be used to prepare other compounds. For example, when it is dissolved in tetrahydrofuran, it is partially reduced to form the mixed-valence complex [Pu^{III}Cl_{2}(THF)_{5}]^{+}[Pu^{IV}Cl_{5}(THF)]^{−}. (THF=tetrahydrofuran). It has also been used to prepare the compound plutonium(IV) N-(tert-butyl)isobutyramide (Pu(ita)_{4}, ita=N-(tert-butyl)isobutyramide) through reaction with potassium N-(tert-butyl)isobutyramide. Pu(ita)_{4} has been investigated in the production of oxidation state-pure plutonium(IV) oxide.

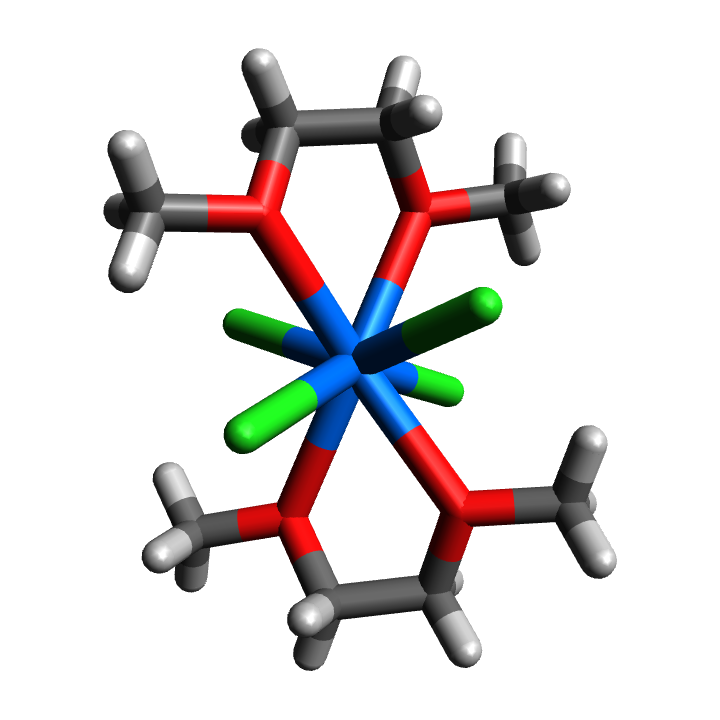
The structure of the dimethoxyethane adduct of plutonium tetrachloride. Green represents chlorine atoms, red represents oxygen atoms, grey represents carbon atoms, white represents hydrogen atoms, and blue represents plutonium atoms.

=== Other complexes ===
Plutonium tetrachloride also forms an adduct with diphenylsulfoxide (Ph_{2}SO). This adduct has been prepared by boiling a solution consisting of plutonium(IV) dissolved in hydrochloric acid, suspending the residue in acetonitrile, and adding to it an acetonitrile solution of diphenylsulfoxide. The resulting product has the formula PuCl_{4}(Ph_{2}SO)_{3}, and is a rare example of plutonium in its +4 oxidation state with a coordination number of 7 (forming 7 bonds).

When the related compound dicaesium hexachloroplutonate is reacted with liquid ammonia at low temperatures, the ammoniate (solid incorporating ammonia). The initial product has composition PuCl_{4}·~7–8NH_{3}, which decomposes over a period of weeks to form PuCl_{4}·5NH_{3}. PuCl_{4}·5NH_{3} is stable at room temperature. Both compounds are ammine complexes, meaning that the ammonia in them is bonded to the plutonium atoms.

== Related compounds ==
=== Anionic derivatives ===
Even though binary plutonium(IV) chloride is not known as a solid, solid compounds derived from it, such as dicaesium hexachloroplutonate (Cs_{2}PuCl_{6}), are known. In this compound, the +4 oxidation state of plutonium is stabilized by complexing with caesium chloride. It is made up of discrete hexachloroplutonate (PuCl^{2−}_{6}) ions.

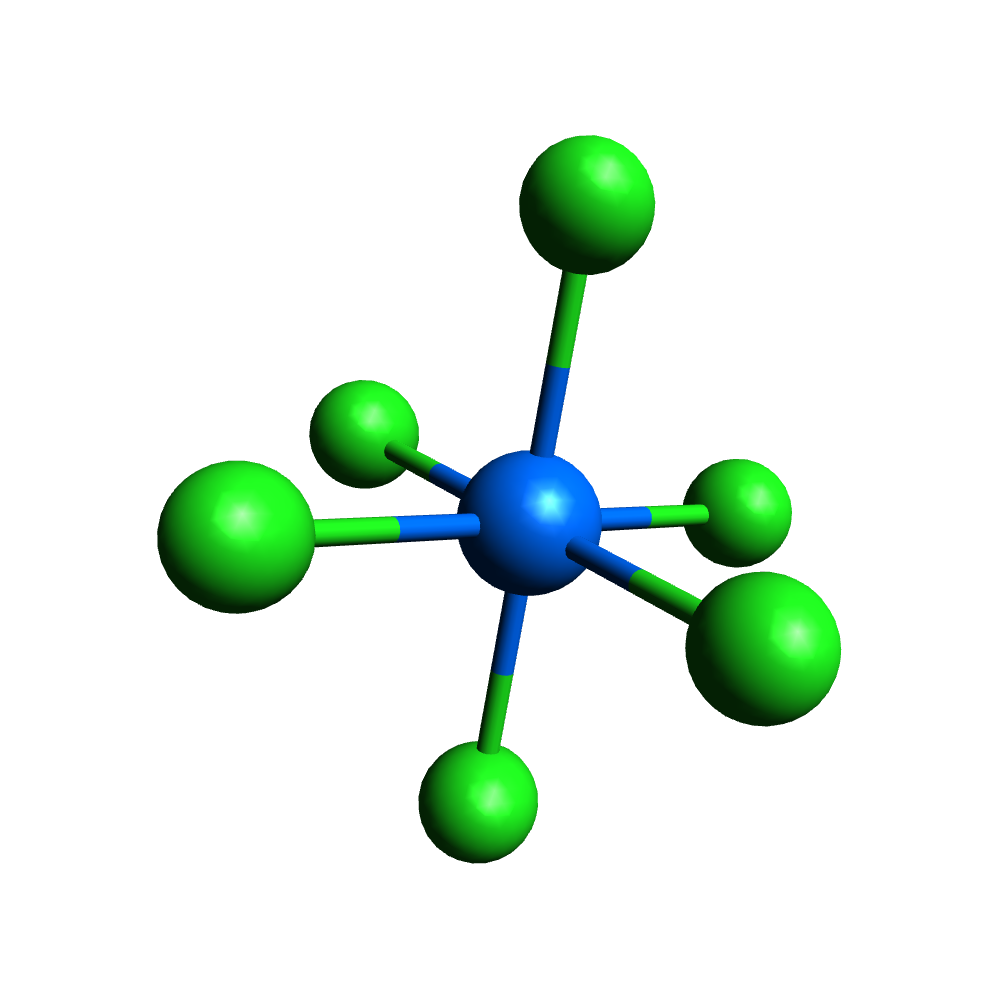
Diagram of the hexachloroplutonate ion. Green spheres represent chlorine atoms, and blue spheres represent plutonium atoms.
