= Plutonium(III) iodide =

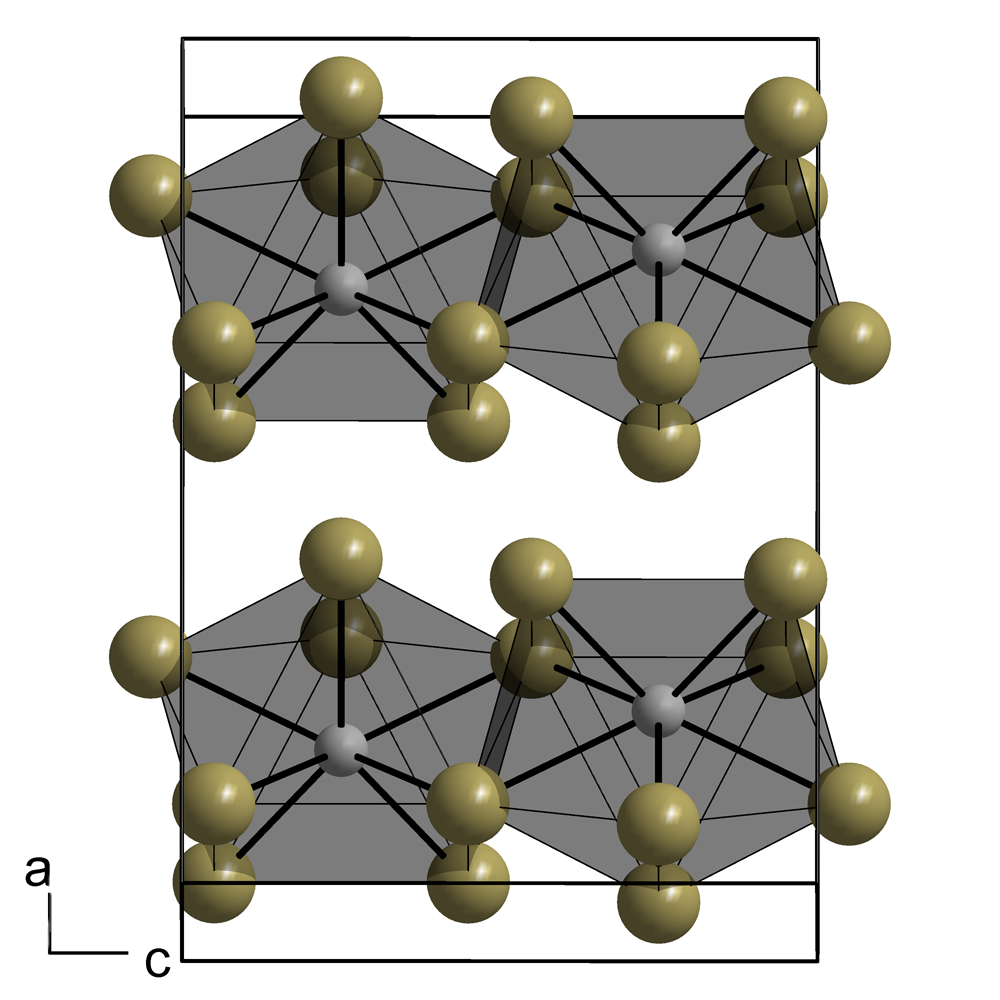

Identifiers
CAS Number	13813-46-2
3D model (JSmol)	Interactive image
PubChem CID	145816492
- InChI: InChI=1S/3HI.Pu/h3*1H;/q;;;+3/p-3 Key: OYUSUDICDNMHEI-UHFFFAOYSA-K
- SMILES: [I-].[I-].[I-].[Pu+3]

Properties
Appearance	green solid
Density	6.92 g·cm^{−3}
Melting point	777 °C

Structure
Crystal structure	orthorhombic
Space group	Ccmm (No. 63)
Lattice constant	a = 433 pm, b = 1395 pm, c = 996 pm

Related compounds
Other anions	plutonium(III) hydride plutonium(III) fluoride plutonium(III) chloride plutonium(III) bromide
Other cations	neptunium(III) iodide americium(III) iodide
- Except where otherwise noted, data are given for materials in their standard state (at 25 °C [77 °F], 100 kPa). Infobox references

Plutonium(III) iodide is the iodide of plutonium with the chemical formula PuI_{3}.

== Preparation ==
Plutonium(III) iodide can be formed by the reaction of plutonium and mercury(II) iodide:

2 Pu + 3 HgI_{2} → 2 PuI_{3} + 3 Hg

It can also be produced by reacting plutonium and hydrogen iodide at 450 °C. Even if there is only a small amount of oxygen and water in the reaction, the generated plutonium(III) iodide will immediately hydrolyze into plutonium oxyiodide.

2 Pu + 6 HI → 2 PuI_{3} + 3 H_{2}

== Properties ==
Plutonium(III) iodide is a green solid with a melting point of 777 °C. It is orthorhombic (plutonium(III) bromide structure), space group Ccmm (No. 63), lattice parameters a = 433 pm, b = 1395 pm and c = 996 pm.

== External reading ==
- Clark, David L.; Hecker, Siegfried S.; Jarvinen, Gordon D.; Neu, Mary P. (2006), "Plutonium", in Morss, Lester R.; Edelstein, Norman M.; Fuger, Jean (eds.), The Chemistry of the Actinide and Transactinide Elements, Dordrecht: Springer Netherlands, pp. 813–1264, doi:10.1007/1-4020-3598-5_7, ISBN 978-1-4020-3555-5
