= Plutonium nitride =

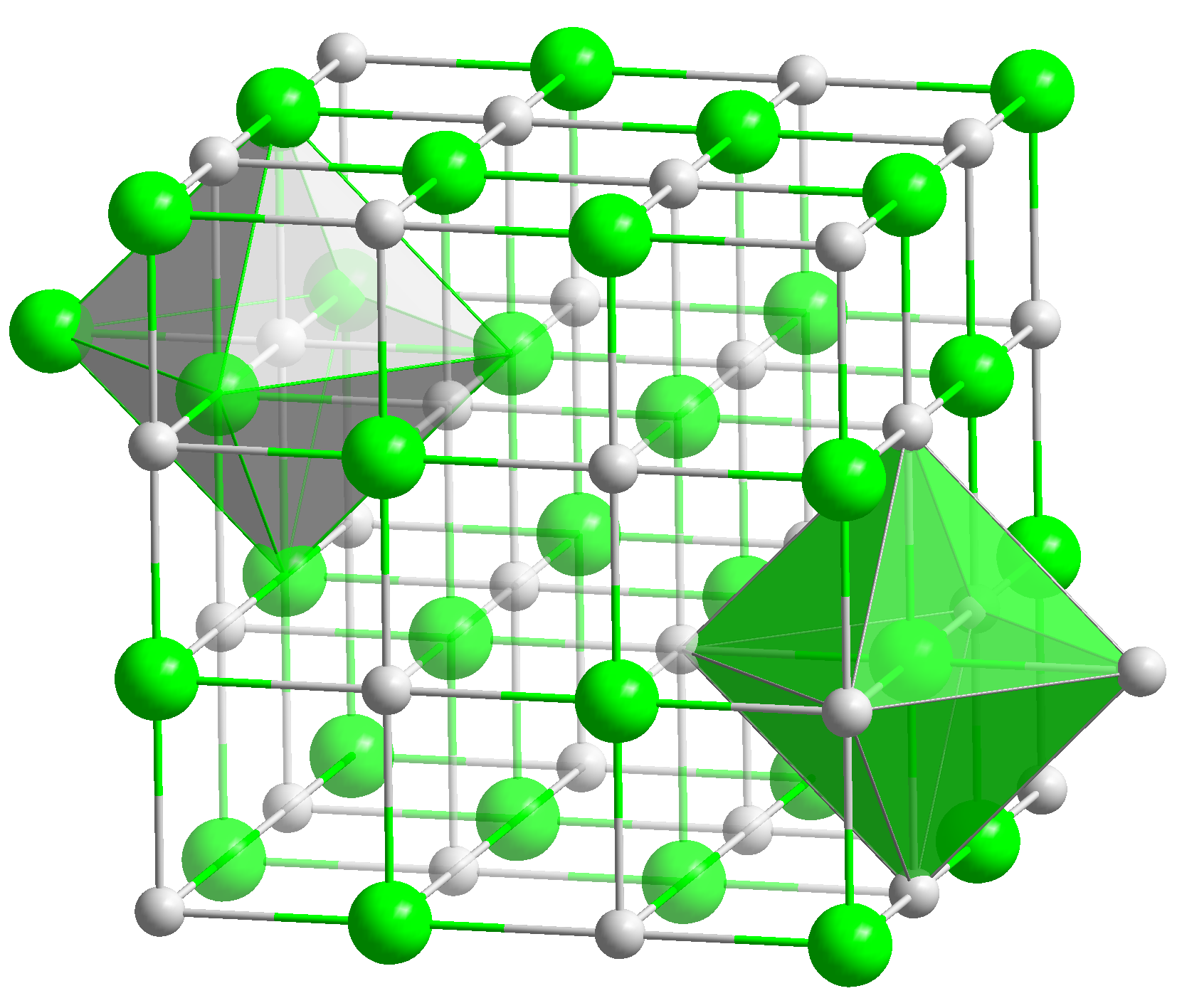

Names
- Other names plutonium mononitride, azanylidyneplutonium, plutonium(III) nitride

Identifiers
CAS Number	12033-54-4
3D model (JSmol)	Interactive image
ChemSpider	129548931
- InChI: InChI=1S/N.Pu Key: DPJMGCIEQAVKAI-UHFFFAOYSA-N
- SMILES: N#[Pu]

Properties
Chemical formula	NPu
Molar mass	258 g·mol^{−1}
Appearance	Grey crystalline solid
Density	14.2 g/cm^{3}
Melting point	2,589 °C (4,692 °F; 2,862 K)
Solubility in water	insoluble
- Except where otherwise noted, data are given for materials in their standard state (at 25 °C [77 °F], 100 kPa). Infobox references

Plutonium nitride is a binary inorganic compound of plutonium and nitrogen with the chemical formula PuN.

== Synthesis ==
Plutonium nitride can be prepared by the reaction of plutonium hydrides with nitrogen or ammonia at a temperature of 650 °C and a pressure of 0.3 kPa.

Another method to prepare plutonium nitride is from the reduction of plutonium(III) iodide with sodium in liquid ammonia:

PuI_{3} + NH_{3} + 3Na → PuN + 3NaI + 3/_{2}H_{2}

Other reactions can also produce plutonium nitride:

Pu + 1/_{2}N_{2} + 3/_{2}H_{2} → PuN + 3/_{2}H_{2} (at 1000°C)
PuCl_{3} + 1/_{2}N_{2} + 3/_{2}H_{2} → PuN + 3HCl (at 800–900°C)

== Physical properties ==
Plutonium nitride forms grey crystals in the cubic system with Fm3m space group. It can be dissolved electrochemically.

== Uses ==
Plutonium nitride can be used as fuel in nuclear reactors.
