= Plutonium(IV) oxalate =

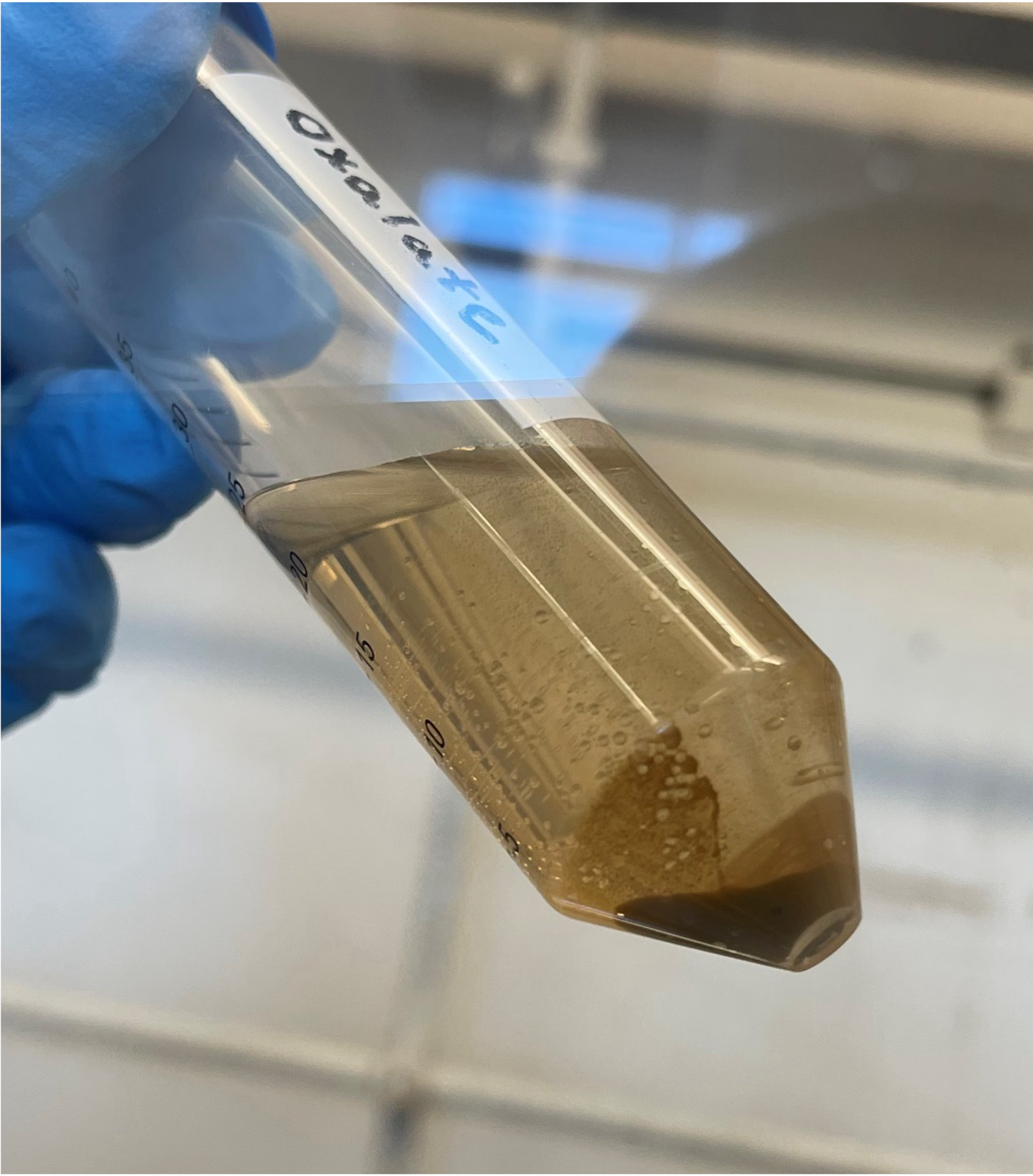

Names
- IUPAC name Plutonium(IV) oxalate

Identifiers
CAS Number	26588-74-9
3D model (JSmol)	Interactive image; monohydrate: Interactive image; hexahydrate: Interactive image
ChemSpider	67156769
- InChI: InChI=1S/2C2H2O4.Pu/c2*3-1(4)2(5)6;/h2*(H,3,4)(H,5,6);/q;;+4/p-4 Key: HRBJILZCKYHUJF-UHFFFAOYSA-J; monohydrate: InChI=1S/2C2H2O4.H2O.Pu/c2*3-1(4)2(5)6;;/h2*(H,3,4)(H,5,6);1H2;/q;;;+4/p-4 Key: HREQBACQGGWTFI-UHFFFAOYSA-J; hexahydrate: InChI=1S/2C2H2O4.6H2O.Pu/c2*3-1(4)2(5)6;;;;;;;/h2*(H,3,4)(H,5,6);6*1H2;/q;;;;;;;;+4/p-4 Key: RDOKXICWLPUQSX-UHFFFAOYSA-J
- SMILES: C(=O)(C(=O)[O-])[O-].C(=O)(C(=O)[O-])[O-].[Pu+4]; monohydrate: C(=O)(C(=O)[O-])[O-].C(=O)(C(=O)[O-])[O-].[Pu+4].O; hexahydrate: C(=O)(C(=O)[O-])[O-].C(=O)(C(=O)[O-])[O-].[Pu+4].O.O.O.O.O.O

Properties
Chemical formula	Pu(C_{2}O_{4})_{2}
Molar mass	580 g·mol^{−1}

Related compounds
Other cations	Thorium(IV) oxalate Uranium(IV) oxalate Neptunium(IV) oxalate
Related plutonium oxalates	Plutonium(III) oxalate Plutonyl oxalate
- Except where otherwise noted, data are given for materials in their standard state (at 25 °C [77 °F], 100 kPa). Infobox references

Plutonium(IV) oxalate is a compound consisting of plutonium and oxalate with the formula Pu(C_{2}O_{4})_{2}. It is produced by addition of oxalic acid to plutonium solution, and is widely used in the synthesis of plutonium(IV) oxide for nuclear reprocessing, plutonium recovery from radioactive waste, or lab use. It is also a starting material for the production of other plutonium compounds, such as plutonium(III) fluoride, plutonium(IV) fluoride, or plutonium(III) chloride.

== Synthesis ==
Plutonium(IV) oxalate is prepared by the combination of oxalic acid solution and plutonium(IV)-nitric acid solution, after which it precipitates as the hexahydrate, Pu(C_{2}O_{4})_{2}·6H_{2}O. Hydrogen peroxide can be added to prevent reduction to plutonium(III):

Pu(NO_{3})_{4} + H_{2}C_{2}O_{4} + 6 H_{2}O → Pu(C_{2}O_{4})_{2}·6H_{2}O ↓ + 4 HNO_{3}

There are three ways that these solutions can be combined: direct strike (adding oxalic acid to nitric acid solution), reverse strike (adding nitric acid solution to oxalic acid), and continuous (adding nitric acid solution and oxalic acid simultaneously).

== Properties ==
Plutonium(IV) oxalate forms several hydrates, notably the hexahydrate, Pu(C_{2}O_{4})_{2}·6H_{2}O, which has been variously described as tan or yellow-green. Other hydrates are known, such as the monohydrate (Pu(C_{2}O_{4})_{2}·H_{2}O) and dihydrate (Pu(C_{2}O_{4})_{2}·2H_{2}O), and the compound can also be found without water as Pu(C_{2}O_{4})_{2}.

=== Decomposition ===
The thermal decomposition of plutonium(IV) oxalate hexahydrate starts by it losing water. It goes through the dihydrate, Pu(C_{2}O_{4})_{2}·2H_{2}O, and the monohydrate, Pu(C_{2}O_{4})_{2}·H_{2}O, as intermediates before arriving at anhydrous plutonium(IV) oxalate:

Pu(C_{2}O_{4})_{2}·6H_{2}O → Pu(C_{2}O_{4})_{2}·2H_{2}O + 4 H_{2}O (between 60–100 °C)
Pu(C_{2}O_{4})_{2}·2H_{2}O → Pu(C_{2}O_{4})_{2}·H_{2}O + H_{2}O (between 100–120 °C)
Pu(C_{2}O_{4})_{2}·H_{2}O → Pu(C_{2}O_{4})_{2} + H_{2}O (between 120–180 °C)

The anhydrous form loses carbon dioxide to produce anhydrous plutonium(III) oxalate, Pu_{2}(C_{2}O_{4})_{3}. Upon heating, it loses carbon monoxide, going through several carbonate oxalate phases with compositions Pu_{2}(C_{2}O_{4})_{2}CO_{3} and Pu_{2}C_{2}O_{4}(CO_{3})_{2}, before arriving at plutonium(IV) oxycarbonate PuOCO_{3}. PuOCO_{3} finally releases carbon dioxide to form plutonium dioxide:

2 Pu(C_{2}O_{4})_{2} → Pu_{2}(C_{2}O_{4})_{2}CO_{3} + 2 CO_{2} + CO (between 180–210 °C)
Pu_{2}(C_{2}O_{4})_{2}CO_{3} → Pu_{2}C_{2}O_{4}(CO_{3})_{2} + CO (between 210–235 °C)
Pu_{2}C_{2}O_{4}(CO_{3})_{2} → 2 PuOCO_{3} + 2 CO (between 235–260 °C)
PuOCO_{3} → PuO_{2} + CO_{2} (between 260–400 °C)

Plutonium(IV) oxalate also slowly degrades under ambient conditions. The end product is proposed to be either a colloidal PuO_{2} polymer or PuOCO_{3}.

=== Structure ===
Two structures are predicted for anhydrous Pu(C_{2}O_{4})_{2}. In the first one, each plutonium atom is at the center of a cube formed by eight oxygen atoms coming from four oxalate groups (giving it a coordination geometry of cubic). The plutonium atoms are bonded with both oxygen atoms coming from each oxalate. In the second one, each plutonium atom is at the center of a distorted square antiprism formed by eight oxygen atoms coming from four oxalate groups (giving it a coordination geometry of square antiprismatic). Unlike in the first one, only one oxygen from each oxalate group bonds with the plutonium center, as the other oxygen atom is too far away to form a bond. In both structures, each oxalate group bridges between two plutonium atoms, and both structures consist of two-dimensional plutonium-oxalate layers, though layer-layer interactions are stronger in the second one than in the first one. The second structure has been calculated to be more stable.

The structure of plutonium(IV) hexahydrate (Pu(C_{2}O_{4})_{2}·6H_{2}O) consists of alternating layers of Pu(C_{2}O_{4})_{2}(H_{2}O)_{2} and interstitial water molecules (four waters per formula unit). Within the Pu(C_{2}O_{4})_{2}(H_{2}O)_{2} layers, each plutonium atom is coordinated to ten oxygen atoms, eight from four oxalate groups and two from two water molecules. Three-quarters of the oxalate groups lie perpendicular to the layers, while one quarter of them lie parallel to the plane, providing enough space to fit the two water molecules.

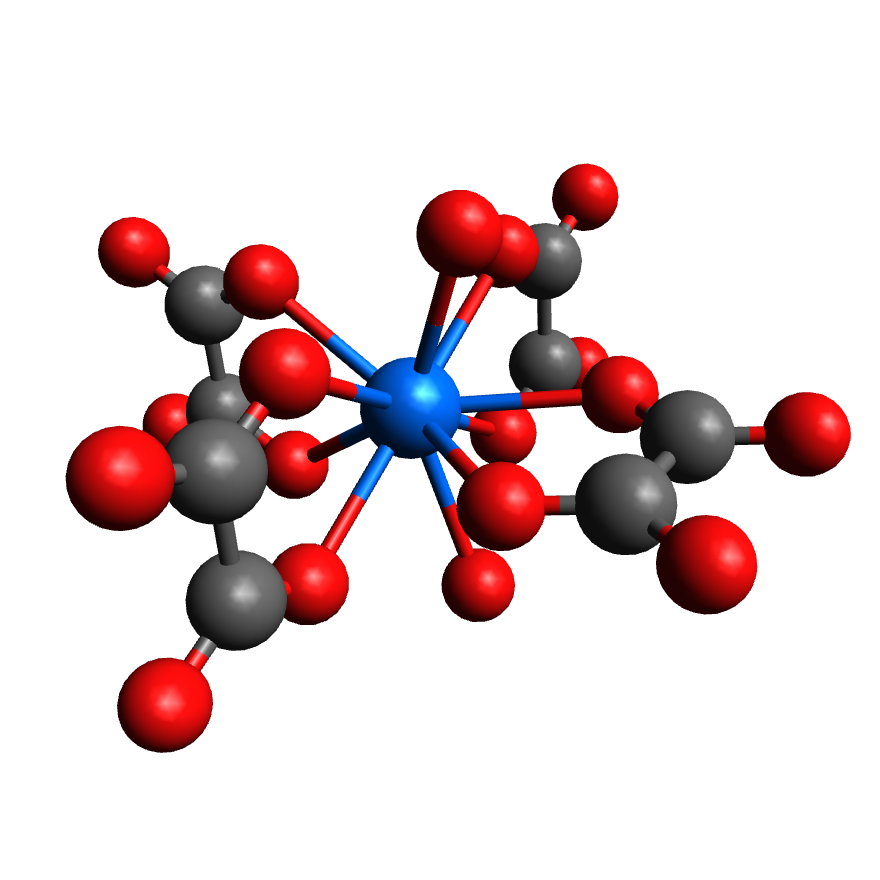
Coordination of plutonium in plutonium(IV) oxalate hexahydrate. Blue is plutonium, grey is carbon, and red is oxygen. Hydrogen atoms are omitted.

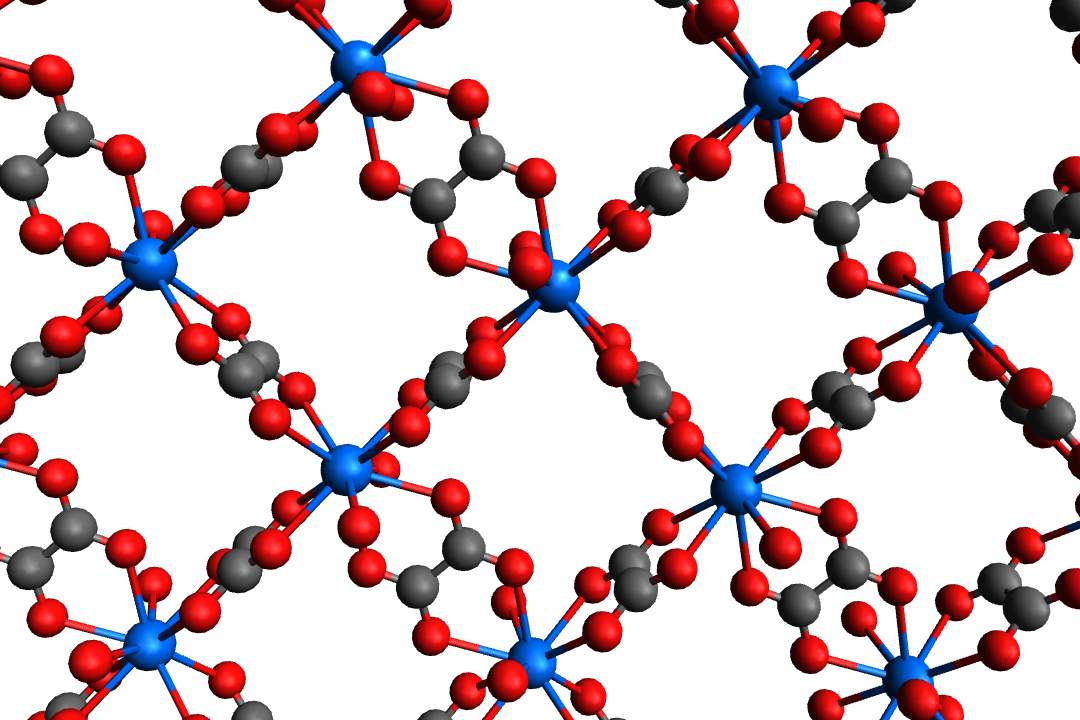
Single layer of plutonium(IV) oxalate hexahydrate. Blue is plutonium, grey is carbon, and red is oxygen. Hydrogen atoms are omitted.

== Uses ==
Plutonium(IV) oxalate is widely used to produce plutonium(IV) oxide (PuO_{2}) via thermal decomposition for applications such as nuclear reprocessing, recovery of plutonium from waste and residues, laboratory use, or plutonium(III) chloride production. The related compound plutonium(III) oxalate can also be used to produce PuO_{2}. After it is synthesized (see synthesis details above), it is first slowly heated up to 700 °C, and then heated afterwards at 1000 °C to remove any leftover carbon. Plutonium(IV) oxide produced by this method appears as a yellow-buff bulky powder. In addition, it can also be converted to plutonium(IV) oxide by hydrothermal methods. This has been proposed as an alternative to thermal decomposition. Because it can be synthesized from nitrate solution and then be converted to the oxide, it can be used in the conversion of plutonium(IV) nitrate to PuO_{2} as an intermediate.

It can also be used for the production of plutonium fluorides. Upon reaction with hydrogen fluoride, it either produces plutonium(III) fluoride (PuF_{3}) or plutonium(IV) fluoride (PuF_{4}). When reducing agents such as hydrogen gas are present, PuF_{3} is formed:

2 Pu(C_{2}O_{4})_{2} + 6 HF → 2 PuF_{3} + 3 CO + 5 CO_{2} + 3 H_{2}O (at 600 °C)
