= Californium(III) oxyiodide =

Names
- Other names Californium oxyiodide

Identifiers
CAS Number	20758-83-2
3D model (JSmol)	Interactive image
- InChI: InChI=1S/Cf.HI.O/h;1H;/q+3;;-2/p-1 Key: GURMYTIIBHTWGL-UHFFFAOYSA-M
- SMILES: [Cf+3].[I-].[O-2]

Properties
Chemical formula	CfIO
Molar mass	394 g·mol^{−1}
Appearance	dark crystals

Structure
Crystal structure	tetragonal

Related compounds
Related compounds	Plutonium oxyiodide
- Except where otherwise noted, data are given for materials in their standard state (at 25 °C [77 °F], 100 kPa). Infobox references

Californium(III) oxyiodide is an inorganic compound of californium, iodine, and oxygen with the formula CfOI. It is obtained by heating Cf_{2}O_{3} in HI. The compound is isostructural with CfOCl and CfOBr. All are prepared by the same method.
