= 1,1,1,2,2,3,3-Heptachloropropane =

Names
- Preferred IUPAC name 1,1,1,2,2,3,3-Heptachloropropane

Identifiers
CAS Number	594-89-8
3D model (JSmol)	Interactive image
ChemSpider	11187
ECHA InfoCard	100.008.962
EC Number	209-856-1
PubChem CID	11677
UNII	J7BW4GD9PS
CompTox Dashboard (EPA)	DTXSID50208130
- InChI: InChI=1S/C3HCl7/c4-1(5)2(6,7)3(8,9)10/h1H Key: YFIIENAGGCUHIQ-UHFFFAOYSA-N
- SMILES: C(C(C(Cl)(Cl)Cl)(Cl)Cl)(Cl)Cl

Properties
Chemical formula	C_{3}HCl_{7}
Molar mass	285.21 g/mol
Melting point	29 °C (84 °F; 302 K)
Boiling point	243.5 °C (470.3 °F; 516.6 K)

Hazards
- GHS labelling
Pictograms	(GHS07: Exclamation mark)
Signal word	Warning
Hazard statements	H315, H319, H335, H413
Precautionary statements	P261, P264, P271, P273, P280, P302+P352, P304+P340, P305+P351+P338, P312, P321, P332+P313, P337+P313, P362, P403+P233, P405, P501

Related compounds
Related compounds	1,1,1,2,3,3,3-Heptafluoropropane
- Except where otherwise noted, data are given for materials in their standard state (at 25 °C [77 °F], 100 kPa). Infobox references

1,1,1,2,2,3,3-Heptachloropropane is a compound of chlorine, hydrogen, and carbon. Its linear formula is C_{2}Cl_{5}CHCl_{2}.

Heptachloropropane is made in a modified Friedel-Crafts or Prins reaction from chloroform and tetrachloroethylene with catalytic aluminum chloride. Dehydrochlorination with a base gives hexachloropropene.
