= Carbonate oxalate =

Class of chemical compounds

The carbonate oxalates are mixed anion compounds that contain both carbonate (CO_{3}) and oxalate (C_{2}O_{4}) anions. Most compounds incorporate large trivalent metal ions, such as the rare earth elements. Some carbonate oxalate compounds of variable composition are formed by heating oxalates.

== Formation ==
One method to form carbonate oxalates is to heat a metal salt with ascorbic acid, which decomposes to oxalate and carbonate and combines with the metal.

== Reactions ==
When heated, oxalate carbonates decompose to carbon monoxide and carbonates, which form oxides at higher temperatures.

== List ==
formula	name	formula weight	crystal form	space group	unit cell Å	volume Å^{3}	density	properties	references
Sc									
K_{4}Ti_{2}O_{2}(C_{2}O_{4})_{3}·CO_{3}									
[Co*(C_{2}O_{4})(CO_{3})]^{2−}								anionic complex	
[Co^{III}(CO_{3})(C_{2}O_{4})(NH_{3})_{2}]-								anionic complex	
Sr[TiO(C2O4)CO_{3}]									
[Y(H_{2}O)]_{2}(C_{2}O_{4})(CO_{3})_{2}	yttrium oxalate carbonate	421.876	orthorhombic	C222_{1}	a = 7.8177, b = 14.943, c = 9.4845, Z = 4	1108.0	2.526		
Ba[ZrO(C_{2}O_{4})(CO_{3})]									
[Ce(H_{2}O)]_{2}[(C_{2}O_{4})_{2}(CO_{3})]·2.5H_{2}O			triclinic	P1_	a 6.329 b 8.743 c 13.000, α 105.61° β 90.55° γ 105.10°				
Pr_{4}(C_{2}O_{4})_{4}(CO_{3})_{2}]·3H_{2}O	catena(bis(μ_{4}-Oxalato)-(μ_{3}-oxalato)-(μ_{2}-oxalato)-bis(μ_{6}-carbonato)-bis(μ_{2}-aqua)-diaqua-tetra-praseodymium hydrate)		triclinic	P1_	a 6.298 b 8.673 c 12.970, α 105.42° β 90.55° γ 105.01°				
Pr_{2}(C_{2}O_{4})(CO_{3})_{2}									
Nd_{4}(C_{2}O_{4})_{4}(CO_{3})_{2}]·3H_{2}O	catena-[bis(μ_{4}-Oxalato)-(μ_{3}-oxalato)-(μ_{2}-oxalato)-bis(μ_{6}-carbonato)-bis(μ_{2}-aqua)-diaqua-tetra-neodymium hydrate]		triclinic	P1_	a 6.273(6)Å b 8.616(7)Å c 12.928(9)Å, α 105.50(6)° β 90.52(7)° γ 105.00(6)°				
(NH_{4})_{2}[Nd_{2}(CO_{3})(C_{2}O_{4})_{3}(H_{2}O)]·H_{2}O	diammonium aqua—carbonato-tri—oxalato-dineodymium(III) hydrate		triclinic	P1_	a=8.706 b=9.530 c=10.327 α = 73.35° β = 86.90° γ = 80.50° Z=2	809.69	2.808		
Eu_{4}(C_{2}O_{4})_{4}(CO_{3})_{2}·3H_{2}O	catena(bis(μ_{4}-Oxalato)-(μ_{3}-oxalato)-(μ_{2}-oxalato)-bis(μ_{6}-carbonato)-bis(μ_{2}-aqua)-diaqua-tetra-europium hydrate)		triclinic	P1_	a 6.179 b 8.464 c 12.856, α 105.13° β 90.46° γ 104.86°				
[Eu(H_{2}O)]_{2}(C_{2}O_{4})(CO_{3})_{2}									
[Gd(H_{2}O)]_{2}(C_{2}O_{4})(CO_{3})_{2}									
[Tb(H_{2}O)]_{2}(C_{2}O_{4})(CO_{3})_{2}									
[Dy(H_{2}O)]_{2}(C_{2}O_{4})(CO_{3})_{2}									
[Ho(H_{2}O)]_{2}(C_{2}O_{4})(CO_{3})_{2}									
Er_{2}(CO_{3})_{2}(C_{2}O_{4})(H_{2}O)_{2}			monoclinic	Cm	a = 7.773, b = 14.920, c = 4.7309, β = 90.12° Z = 2				
Pb[ZrO(C_{2}O_{4})CO_{3}]									
Pb_{4}(CO_{3})_{2}(C_{2}O_{4})(OH)_{2}		535.41	monoclinic	P2_{1}/c	a=11.8593 b=5.2486 c=9.0997 β =96.669 Z=4	562.58	6.321	colourless	
(NH_{4})_{4}[Th(CO_{3})_{2}(C_{2}O_{4})_{2}]•0.5Н_{2}O									
(NH_{4})_{4}[Th(CO_{3})_{2}(C_{2}O_{4})_{2}]•10Н_{2}O									
(CN_{3}H_{6})_{3}(NH_{4})[Th(CO_{3})_{2}(C_{2}O_{4})_{2}]•3Н_{2}O									
(CN_{3}H_{6})_{3}(NH_{4})[Th(CO_{3})_{3}(C_{2}O_{4})]•1.5Н_{2}O									
(CN_{3}H_{6})_{3}(NH_{4})[Th(CO_{3})_{3}(C_{2}O_{4})]•3Н_{2}O									
(CN_{3}H_{6})_{6}[Th_{2}(CO_{3})_{5}(C_{2}O_{4})]	hexaguandinium pentacarbonatooxalato dithorium								
(CN_{3}H_{6})_{6}[Th_{2}(CO_{3})_{5}(C_{2}O_{4})_{2}]•4Н_{2}O									
(CN_{3}H_{6})_{6}[Th_{2}(CO_{3})_{5}(C_{2}O_{4})_{2}]•8Н_{2}O									
(CN_{3}H_{6})_{6}[Th_{2}(CO_{3})_{4}(C_{2}O_{4})_{3}]•14Н_{2}O									
(CN_{3}H_{6})_{8}[Th_{2}(CO_{3})_{7}(C_{2}O_{4})]									
(CN_{3}H_{6})_{8}[Th_{2}(CO_{3})_{7}(C_{2}O_{4})]•5Н_{2}O									
(CN_{3}H_{6})_{8}[Th_{2}(CO_{3})_{7}(C_{2}O_{4})]•6Н_{2}O									
(CN_{3}H_{6})_{8}[Th_{2}(CO_{3})_{5}(C_{2}O_{4})_{3}]•Н_{2}O									
(CN_{3}H_{6})_{10}[Th_{2}(CO_{3})_{8}(C_{2}O_{4})]•8Н_{2}O									
Na_{4}[Th_{2}(OH)_{2}(CO_{3})_{4}(C_{2}O_{4})]•4Н_{2}O									
Na_{4}[Th_{2}(OH)_{6}(CO_{3})_{2}(C_{2}O_{4})]•2Н_{2}O									
Na_{8}Th(C_{2}O_{4})_{2}(CO_{3})_{4} •11Н_{2}O									
Na_{8}[Th(CO_{3})_{5}(C_{2}O_{4})]•11Н_{2}O									
Na_{10}[Th(CO_{3})_{5}(C_{2}O_{4})_{2}]•11Н_{2}O									
Na_{10}[Th(CO_{3})_{5}(C_{2}O_{4})_{2}]•16Н_{2}O									
Na_{10}[Th(OH)_{2}(CO_{3})_{3}(C_{2}O_{4})_{3}]•8Н_{2}O									
Na_{10}[Th(OH)_{2}(CO_{3})_{3}(C_{2}O_{4})_{3}]									
Na_{12}[Th(CO_{3})_{6}(C_{2}O_{4})_{2}]•11Н_{2}O									
K_{2}[Th_{2}(OH)_{2}(CO_{3})_{3}(C_{2}O_{4})]•2Н_{2}O									
K_{2}[Th_{2}(OH)_{2}(CO_{3})_{3}(C_{2}O_{4})]									
K_{4}[Th(CO_{3})_{3}(C_{2}O_{4})]•6Н_{2}O									
K_{5}[Th_{2}(OH)(CO_{3})_{4}(C_{2}O_{4})2]•2Н_{2}O									
K_{6}[Th(CO_{3})_{4}(C_{2}O_{4})]•8Н_{2}O									
K_{6}[Th(CO_{3})_{3}(C_{2}O_{4})_{2}]•4Н_{2}O									
K_{6}[Th_{2}(CO_{3})_{5}(C_{2}O_{4})_{2}]•2Н_{2}O									
K_{6}[Th_{2}(CO_{3})_{4}(C_{2}O_{4})_{3}]•6Н_{2}O									
K_{8}[Th_{2}(CO_{3})_{5}(C_{2}O_{4})_{3}]•13Н_{2}O									
K_{8}[Th_{2}(CO_{3})_{5}(C_{2}O_{4})_{3}]•16Н_{2}O									
K_{10}[Th_{2}(CO_{3})_{7}(C_{2}O_{4})_{2}]•8Н_{2}O									
K_{10}[Th_{2}(CO_{3})_{7}(C_{2}O_{4})_{2}]•12Н_{2}O									
K_{10}[Th_{2}(CO_{3})_{7}(C_{2}O_{4})_{2}]•14Н_{2}O									
K_{10}[Th_{2}(CO_{3})5(C_{2}O_{4})4]•5Н_{2}O									
K_{10}[Th_{2}(CO_{3})5(C_{2}O_{4})4]•7Н_{2}O									
(NH_{4})(CN_{3}H_{6})_{3}[(UO_{2})_{2}(CO_{3})(C_{2}O_{4})_{2}(C_{3}H_{4}N_{2}O_{2})] · H_{2}O									
(CN_{3}H_{6})_{4}[(UO_{2})_{2}(CO_{3})(C_{2}O_{4})_{2}(C_{5}H_{8}N_{2}O_{2})] · 1.5H_{2}O	guanidonium μ-carbonate μ-ethylmethylgyoximatedioxylatediuranylate sesquihydrate		monoclinic	P2_{1}	a=6.909 b=15.794 c=30.064 β=96.720° Z=4	3258	2.383	red plates	
(CN_{3}H_{6})_{4}[(UO_{2})_{2}(CO_{3})(C_{2}O_{4})_{2}(C_{6}H_{8}N_{2}O_{2})] · 3H_{2}O									
(NH_{4})(CN_{3}H_{6})_{4}[(UO_{2})_{2}(CO_{3})(C_{2}O_{4})_{2}(C_{6}H_{4}N_{2}O_{2})] · H_{2}O									
(CN_{3}H_{6})_{4}[(UO_{2})_{2}(C_{6}H_{8}N_{2}O_{2})(CO_{3})(C_{2}O_{4})_{2}] · (C_{6}H_{10}N_{2}O_{2}) · 2H_{2}O	guanidinium (3-methyl-1,2-cyclopenadionedioxime)dioxalato (μ-3-methyl-1,2-cyclopenadionedioxato) μ-carbonatodiuranylate dihydrate		triclinic	P1_	a=9.2474 b=14.8562 c=16.8917 α = 68.504° β = 77.721° γ = 89.792° Z=2	2102.7	2.108	red	
(CN_{3}H_{6})_{4}[(UO_{2})_{2}(CO_{3})(C_{2}O_{4})_{2}(C_{7}H_{10}N_{2}O_{2})] · H_{2}O									
NH_{4}(CN_{3}H_{6})_{3}[(UO_{2})_{2}(C_{7}H_{10}N_{2}O_{2})(CO_{3})(C_{2}O_{4})_{2}] · 2H_{2}O	ammonium guanidinium dioxalato (μ-3-methyl-1,2-cyclopenadionedioxato) μ-carbonatodiuranylate dihydrate		orthorhombic	P2_{1}2_{1}2_{1}	a=9.904 b=17.400 c=18.757 Z=4	3232.2	2.393	red	
(CN_{3}H_{6})_{4}[(UO_{2})_{2}(CO_{3})(C_{2}O_{4})_{2}(C_{6}H_{10}N_{2}O_{2})] · H_{2}O	guanidinium dioxalato μ-diethylglyoximato μ-carbonatodiuranylate monohydrate	1176.59	monoclinic	P2_{1}/n	a=7.6140 b=15.4388 c=28.010 β=95.99° Z=4	3274.6	2.387	orange	
(CN_{3}H_{6})_{2}(C_{2}H_{2}N_{2})[(UO_{2})_{2}(CO_{3})(C_{2}O_{4})_{2}(C_{6}H_{10}N_{2}O_{2})] · 3H_{2}O	guanidinium ethylenediammonium dioxalato μ-diethylglyoximato μ-carbonatodiuranylate monohydrate							orange	
[C(NH_{2})_{3}]_{10}[(UO_{2})_{6}(μ3-O)_{2}(μ2-OH)_{2}(C_{2}O_{4})_{4}(CO_{3})_{4}]· 2H_{2}O		2913.21	triclinic	P1_	a=11.5919 b=11.7868 c=13.3545 α = 102.637° β = 93.278° γ = 95.273° Z=1	1759.7	2.749	yellow	
Pu_{2}(C_{2}O_{4})_{2}CO_{3}	Plutonium(III) dioxalate monocarbonate								
Pu_{2}C_{2}O_{4}(CO_{3})_{2}	Plutonium(III) monooxalate dicarbonate								
