= Plutonium oxyiodide =

Names
- Other names Plutonium oxide iodide

Identifiers
3D model (JSmol)	Interactive image
- InChI: InChI=1S/HI.O.Pu/h1H;;/q;-2;+3/p-1 Key: PIKHGZIXTWZKHG-UHFFFAOYSA-M
- SMILES: [I-].[O-2].[Pu+3]

Properties
Chemical formula	PuOI
Molar mass	387 g/mol
Appearance	bright green crystals
Density	8.46 g/cm^{3}
Solubility in water	insoluble

Structure
Crystal structure	tetragonal
Space group	P4/nmm

Related compounds
Other anions	Plutonium oxyfluoride Plutonium oxychloride Plutonium oxybromide
Other cations	Lanthanum oxyiodide Neodymium oxyiodide Californium(III) oxyiodide
- Except where otherwise noted, data are given for materials in their standard state (at 25 °C [77 °F], 100 kPa). Infobox references

Plutonium oxyiodide or plutonium oxide iodide is an inorganic compound of plutonium, oxygen, and iodine with the chemical formula PuOI.

== Synthesis ==
Plutonium oxyiodide is produced in a reaction of plutonium dioxide with hydrogen iodide:

PuO_{2} + ½H_{2} + HI → PuOI + H_{2}O

It can also be made by passing hydrogen iodide through heated plutonium(IV) oxide:

2PuO_{2} + 4HI → 2PuOI + 2H_{2}O + I_{2}

== Physical properties ==
Plutonium oxyiodide forms bright green crystals of the tetragonal crystal system, space group P4/nmm.
