= Curium oxalate =

Curium(III) oxalate
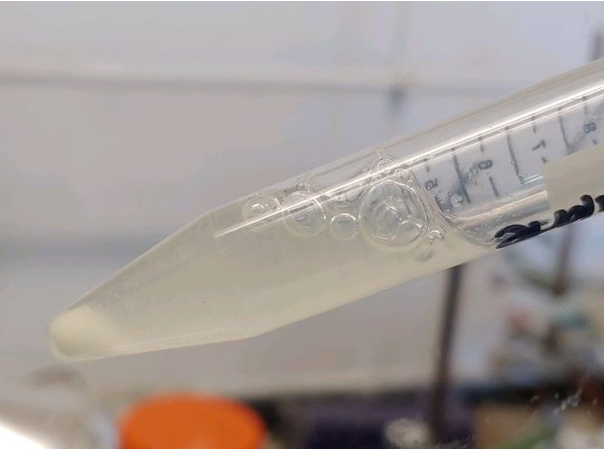

Names
- IUPAC name curium;oxalic acid
- Other names Curium(III) oxalate

Identifiers
CAS Number	15929-88-1
3D model (JSmol)	Interactive image
- InChI: InChI=1S/3C2H2O4.2Cm/c3*3-1(4)2(5)6;;/h3*(H,3,4)(H,5,6);;/q;;;2*+3/p-6 Key: DZVVEXVFMKTTMA-UHFFFAOYSA-H
- SMILES: C(=O)(C(=O)[O-])[O-].C(=O)(C(=O)[O-])[O-].C(=O)(C(=O)[O-])[O-].[Cm+3].[Cm+3]

Properties
Chemical formula	C_{6}H_{6}Cm_{2}O_{12}
Molar mass	764 g·mol^{−1}
Appearance	Bright green solid
Solubility in water	poorly soluble
- Except where otherwise noted, data are given for materials in their standard state (at 25 °C [77 °F], 100 kPa). Infobox references

Curium oxalate is an organic chemical compound with the chemical formula Cm_{2}(C_{2}O_{4})_{3}. This is a curium salt of oxalic acid.

== Synthesis ==
Curium oxalate can be obtained when aqueous curium(III) solutions are treated with oxalic acid:

2Cm^{3+} + 3H_{2}C_{2}O_{4} + 10H_{2}O → 2Cm_{2}(C_{2}O_{4})_{3} · 10H_{2}O + 6H^{+}

== Chemical properties ==
Curium oxalate can decompose when heated. Its decahydrate loses water at 280 °C to form an anhydrous form. It begins to decompose at 300 °C, releasing carbon monoxide. At 360°C, it forms Cm_{2}(CO_{3})_{3}, and releases carbon monoxide and carbon dioxide. At 550°C, it forms an oxide and undergoes partial oxidation in the air. The resulting curium(III) oxide contains curium in the +4 oxidation state. However, some literature indicates that curium oxalate can produce carbonate species due to its own radiolysis, and this decomposition can occur at room temperature. In addition, curium oxalate forms black curium dioxide at 500 °C.

== Physical properties ==
The compound forms a bright green solid, poorly soluble in water.

== Uses ==
Curium oxalate is routinely used to prepare curium(IV) oxide (CmO_{2}) via curium(III) hydroxide (Cm(OH)_{3}).
