= Plutonium hydride =

Plutonium hydride may refer to:

- Plutonium dihydride, PuH_{2}
- Plutonium trihydride, PuH_{3}
