= Hexachloropropene =

Names
- Preferred IUPAC name 1,1,2,3,3,3-Hexachloroprop-1-ene

Identifiers
CAS Number	1888-71-7
3D model (JSmol)	Interactive image
ChemSpider	15113
ECHA InfoCard	100.015.965
EC Number	217-560-9
PubChem CID	15902
UNII	740VOV69VZ
UN number	3382 3082
CompTox Dashboard (EPA)	DTXSID7062039
- InChI: InChI=1S/C3Cl6/c4-1(2(5)6)3(7,8)9 Key: VFDYKPARTDCDCU-UHFFFAOYSA-N; InChI=1/C3Cl6/c4-1(2(5)6)3(7,8)9 Key: VFDYKPARTDCDCU-UHFFFAOYAH
- SMILES: C(=C(Cl)Cl)(C(Cl)(Cl)Cl)Cl

Properties
Chemical formula	C_{3}Cl_{6}
Molar mass	248.75 g/mol
Appearance	colourless liquid
Density	1.765 g/cm^{3} (at 25 °C)
Melting point	−73 °C (−99 °F; 200 K)
Boiling point	209–210 °C (408–410 °F; 482–483 K)
Solubility in water	0.25 g/L
Solubility	soluble in carbon tetrachloride, ethanol and diethyl ether

Hazards
- GHS labelling
Pictograms	(GHS06: Toxic) (GHS07: Exclamation mark)
Signal word	Danger
Hazard statements	H315, H319, H330, H332, H335
Precautionary statements	P260, P264, P271, P280, P284, P302+P352, P304+P312, P304+P340, P305+P351+P338, P310, P312, P320, P321, P332+P313, P337+P313, P362, P403+P233, P405, P501
- Except where otherwise noted, data are given for materials in their standard state (at 25 °C [77 °F], 100 kPa). Infobox references

Hexachloropropene is a compound of chlorine and carbon with the linear formula CCl_{3}CCl=CCl_{2}. It is a colourless liquid at room temperature. It is toxic for humans.

Hexachloropropene can be produced by the dehydrochlorination reaction of 1,1,1,2,2,3,3-heptachloropropane by potassium hydroxide in methanol solution. 1,1,1,2,2,3,3-Heptachloropropane is produced by the reaction of chloroform and tetrachloroethylene:

CHCl_{3} + C_{2}Cl_{4} → C_{3}HCl_{7}
C_{3}HCl_{7} + KOH → C_{3}Cl_{6} + KCl + H_{2}O

Hexachloropropene can be used to produce other compounds such as uranium tetrachloride, anhydrous niobium pentachloride and tungsten hexachloride.
