= Plutonium(III) fluoride =

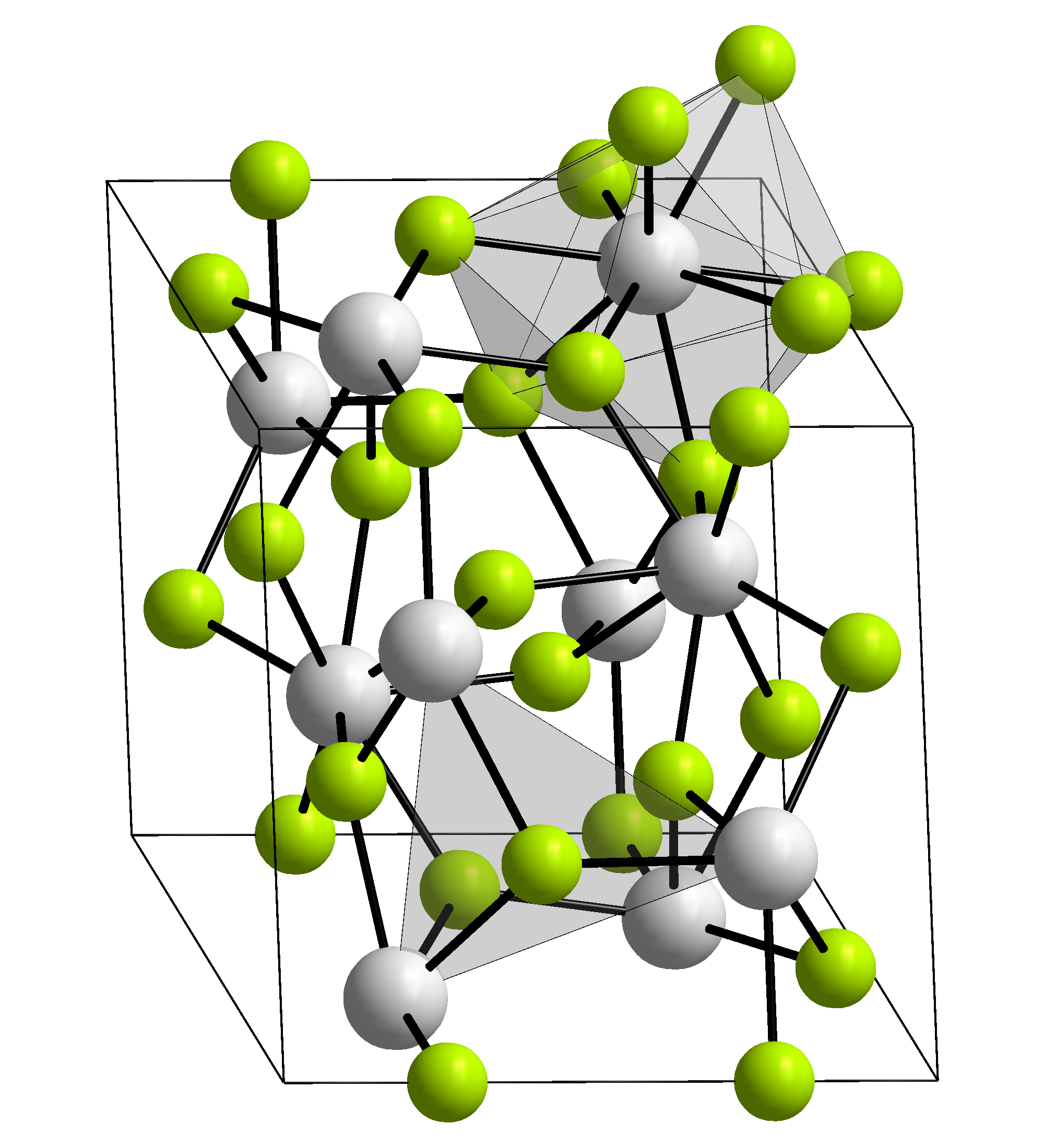
- Unit cell, ball and stick model of plutonium(III) fluoride

Names
- IUPAC name Plutonium(III) fluoride
- Systematic IUPAC name Plutonium(3+) fluoride
- Other names Plutonic fluoride Plutonium fluoride Plutonium trifluoride

Identifiers
| CAS Number | 13842-83-6 |
| 3D model (JSmol) | Interactive image |
| ChemSpider | 123138 |
| PubChem CID | 139624 |
| CompTox Dashboard (EPA) | DTXSID60930112 |
- InChI: InChI=1S/3FH.Pu/h3*1H;/q;;;+3/p-3 Key: DBYIUAMLRDFZJJ-UHFFFAOYSA-K
- SMILES: [F-].[F-].[F-].[Pu+3]

Properties
| Chemical formula | PuF_{3} |
| Molar mass | 301 g·mol^{−1} |
| Appearance | Violet, opaque crystals |
| Density | 9.3 g cm^{−3} |
| Melting point | 1,396 °C (2,545 °F; 1,669 K) |
| Boiling point | 2,000 °C (3,630 °F; 2,270 K) (decomposes) |

Related compounds
| Other anions | Plutonium(III) chloride |
| Other cations | Samarium(III) fluoride |
| Related plutonium chlorides | Plutonium tetrafluoride Plutonium hexafluoride |
- Except where otherwise noted, data are given for materials in their standard state (at 25 °C [77 °F], 100 kPa). Infobox references

Plutonium(III) fluoride or plutonium trifluoride is the chemical compound composed of plutonium and fluorine with the formula PuF_{3}. This salt forms violet crystals. Plutonium(III) fluoride has the LaF_{3} structure where the coordination around the plutonium atoms is complex and usually described as tri-capped trigonal prismatic.

== Reactions ==
A plutonium(III) fluoride precipitation method has been investigated as an alternative to the typical plutonium peroxide method of recovering plutonium from solution, such as that from a nuclear reprocessing plant. A 1957 study by the Los Alamos National Laboratory reported a less effective recovery than the traditional method, while a more recent study sponsored by the United States Office of Scientific and Technical Information found it to be one of the more effective methods.

Plutonium(III) fluoride can be used for manufacture of the plutonium-gallium alloy instead of more difficult to handle metallic plutonium.
