= Plutonium(III) bromide =

Names
- IUPAC name Plutonium tribromide
- Other names Plutonium(III) bromide

Identifiers
CAS Number	15752-46-2; 20737-00-2 hexahydrate
3D model (JSmol)	Interactive image
ChemSpider	129557993
- InChI: InChI=1S/3BrH.Pu/h3*1H;/q;;;+3/p-3 Key: ZOUHELNKIRPXTH-UHFFFAOYSA-K
- SMILES: [Br-].[Br-].[Br-].[Pu+3]

Properties
Chemical formula	Br_{3}Pu
Molar mass	484 g·mol^{−1}
Appearance	Green
Melting point	767 °C (1,413 °F; 1,040 K)
Boiling point	1,463 °C (2,665 °F; 1,736 K)
Solubility in water	Water soluble
- Except where otherwise noted, data are given for materials in their standard state (at 25 °C [77 °F], 100 kPa). Infobox references

Plutonium(III) bromide is an inorganic salt of bromine and plutonium with the formula PuBr_{3}. This radioactive green solid has few uses, however its crystal structure is often used as a structural archetype in crystallography.

== Crystal structure ==
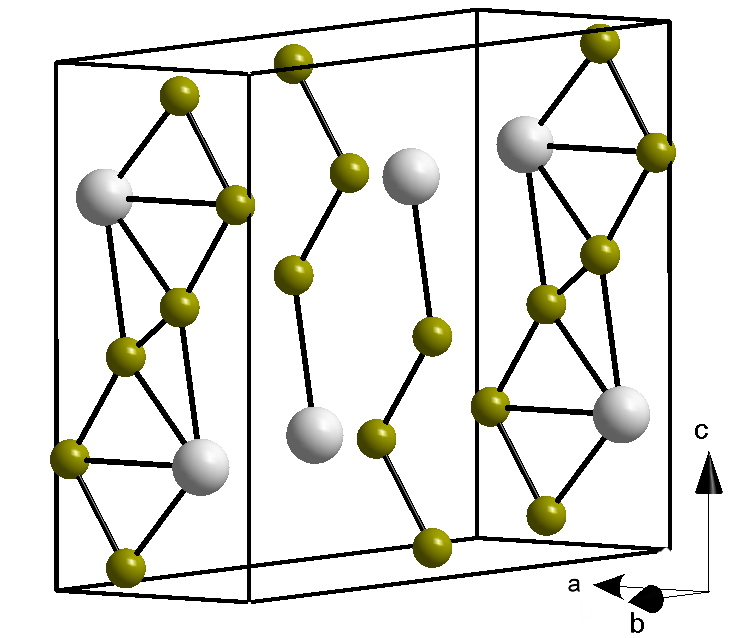
Crystal structure

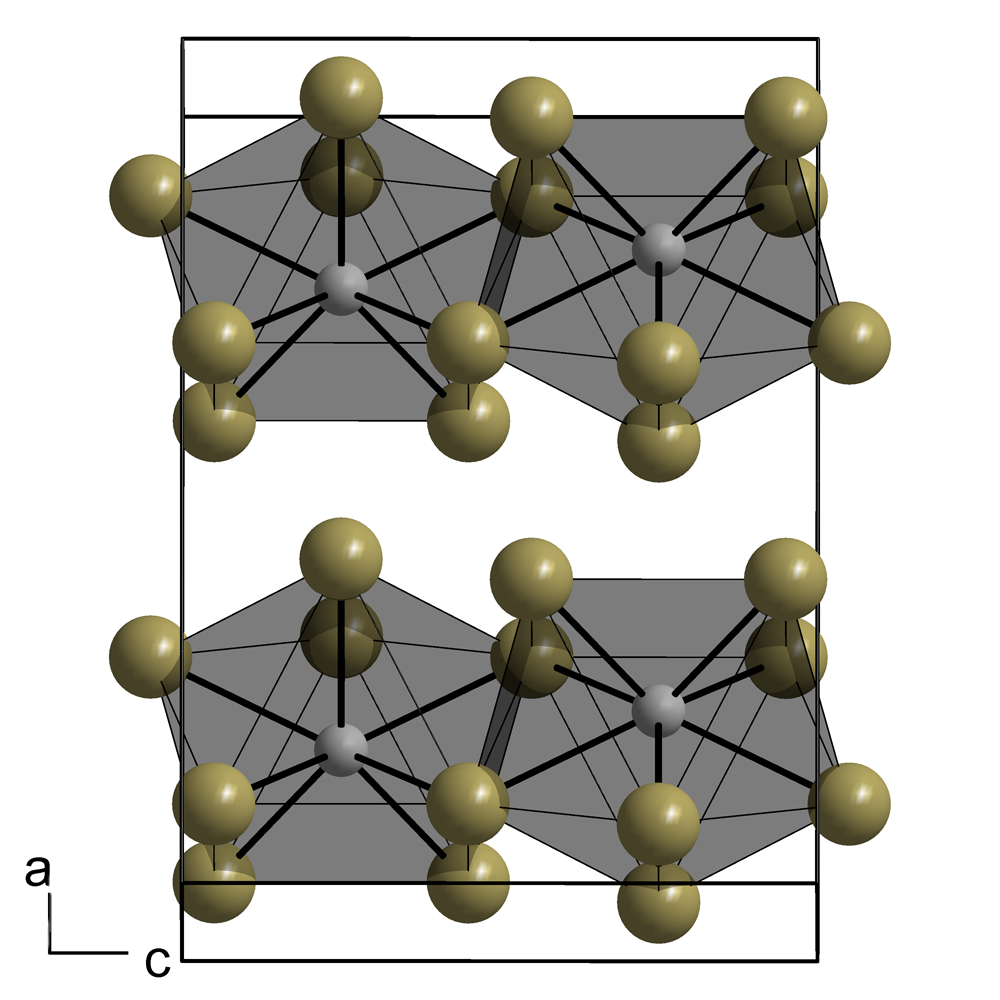
Unit cell

PuBr_{3}: Pu^{3+} Br^{−}

The PuBr_{3} crystal structure was first published in 1948 by William Houlder Zachariasen. The compound forms orthorhombic crystals, a type of square antiprism, within which the Pu atoms adopt an 8-coordinate bicapped trigonal prismatic arrangement. Its Pearson symbol is oS16 with the corresponding space group No. 63 (in International Union of Crystallography classification) or Cmcm (in Hermann–Mauguin notation).
