= Plutonium(IV) oxide =

Chemical compound

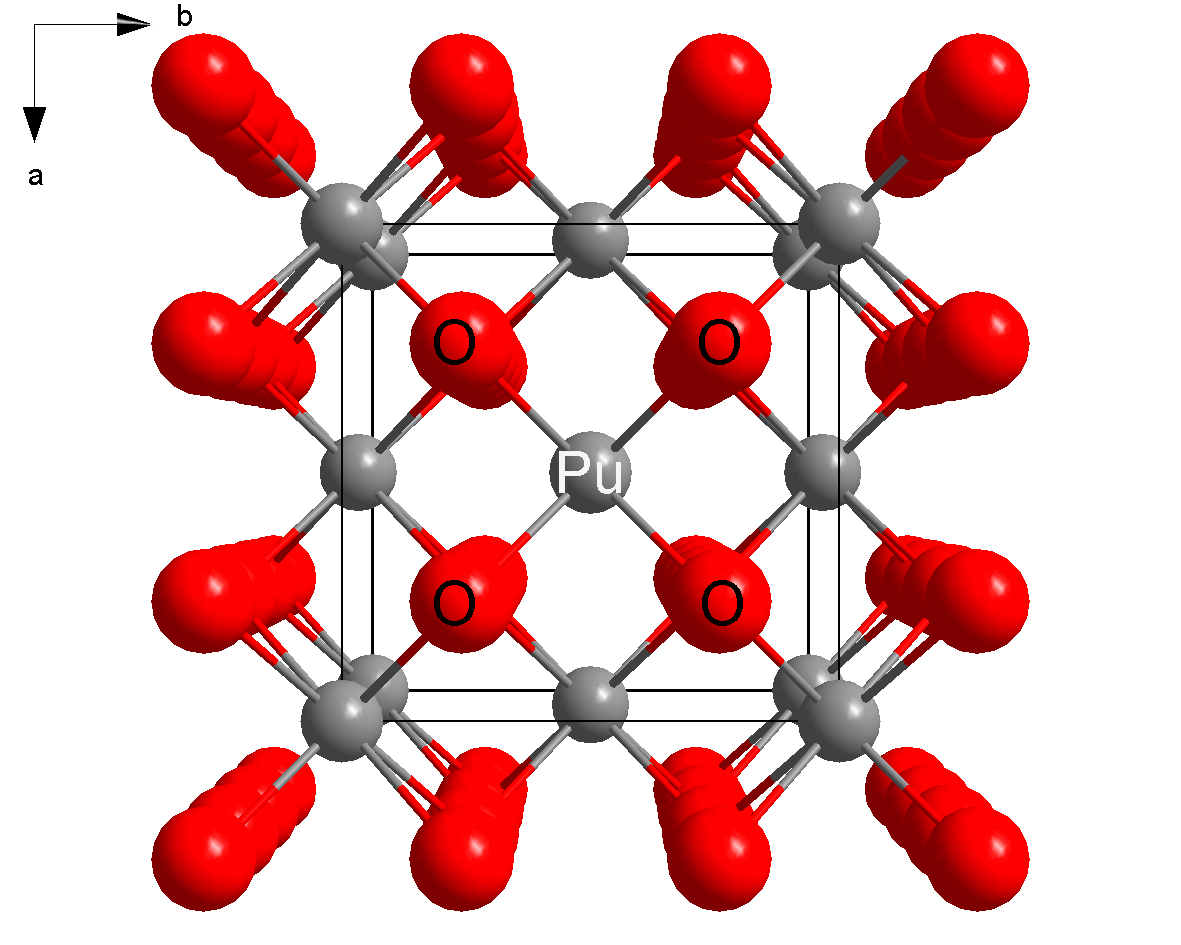
- Unit cell, ball and stick model of plutonium(IV) oxide

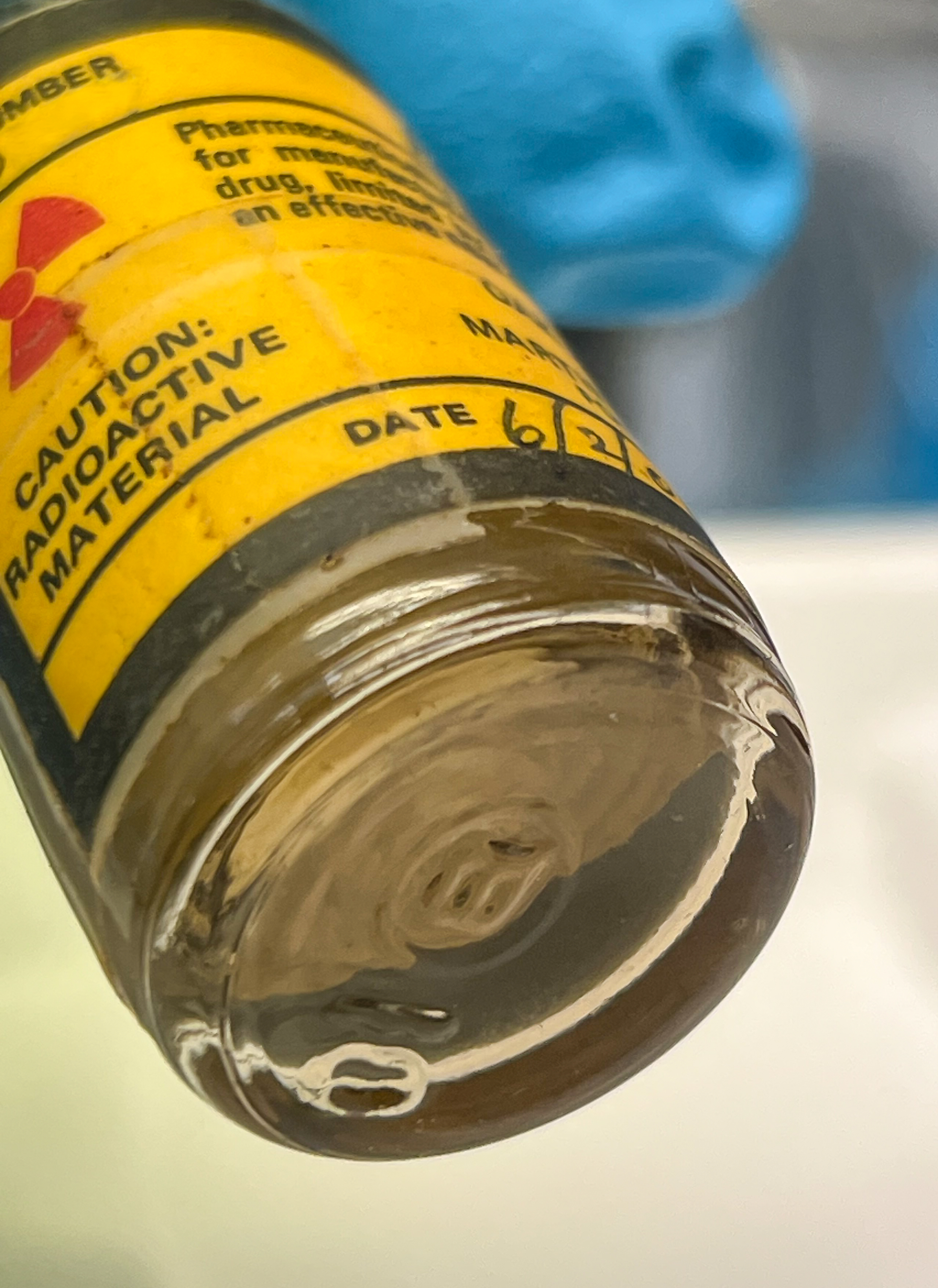

Names
- IUPAC name Plutonium(IV) oxide
- Other names Plutonium dioxide

Identifiers
CAS Number	12059-95-9
3D model (JSmol)	Interactive image
ChemSpider	10617028
ECHA InfoCard	100.031.840
EC Number	235-037-3
PubChem CID	9795444
CompTox Dashboard (EPA)	DTXSID30894111
- InChI: InChI=1S/2O.Pu/q2*-2;+4 Key: FLDALJIYKQCYHH-UHFFFAOYSA-N
- SMILES: [O-2].[O-2].[Pu+4]

Properties
Chemical formula	O_{2}Pu
Molar mass	276 g·mol^{−1}
Appearance	Dark yellow crystals
Density	11.5 g cm^{−3}
Melting point	2,744 °C (4,971 °F; 3,017 K)
Boiling point	2,800 °C (5,070 °F; 3,070 K)

Structure
Crystal structure	Fluorite (cubic), cF12
Space group	Fm3̅m, No. 225
Lattice constant	a = 539.5 pm
Coordination geometry	Tetrahedral (O^{2−}); cubic (Pu^{IV})

Hazards
- Occupational safety and health (OHS/OSH)
Main hazards	Radioactive
NFPA 704 (fire diamond)	4 0 0
Flash point	non-flammable

Related compounds
Other cations	Uranium(IV) oxide Neptunium(IV) oxide Americium(IV) oxide
- Except where otherwise noted, data are given for materials in their standard state (at 25 °C [77 °F], 100 kPa). verify (what is ?) Infobox references

Plutonium(IV) oxide, or plutonia, is a chemical compound with the formula PuO_{2}. This high melting-point solid is a principal compound of plutonium. It can vary in color from yellow to olive green, depending on the particle size, temperature and method of production.

== Structure ==
PuO_{2} crystallizes in the fluorite motif, with the Pu^{4+} centers organized in a face-centered cubic array and oxide ions occupying tetrahedral holes.

At high temperatures PuO_{2} tends to lose oxygen, becoming sub-stoichiometric PuO_{2−x}, with the introduction of lower valence Pu^{3+}. This continues into the molten liquid state where the local Pu-O coordination number drops to predominantly 6-fold, compared to 8-fold in the stoichiometric fluorite structure.

== Properties ==
Plutonium dioxide is a stable ceramic material with an extremely low solubility in water and with a high melting point (2,744 °C). The melting point was revised upwards in 2011 by several hundred degrees, based on evidence from rapid laser melting studies which avoid contamination by any container material.

As with all plutonium compounds, it is subject to control under the Nuclear Non-Proliferation Treaty.

== Synthesis ==
Plutonium spontaneously oxidizes to PuO_{2} in an atmosphere of oxygen. Plutonium dioxide is mainly produced by calcination of plutonium(IV) oxalate, Pu(C_{2}O_{4})_{2}·6H_{2}O, at 300 °C. Plutonium oxalate is obtained during the reprocessing of nuclear fuel as plutonium is dissolved in a solution of nitric and hydrofluoric acid.

== Applications ==
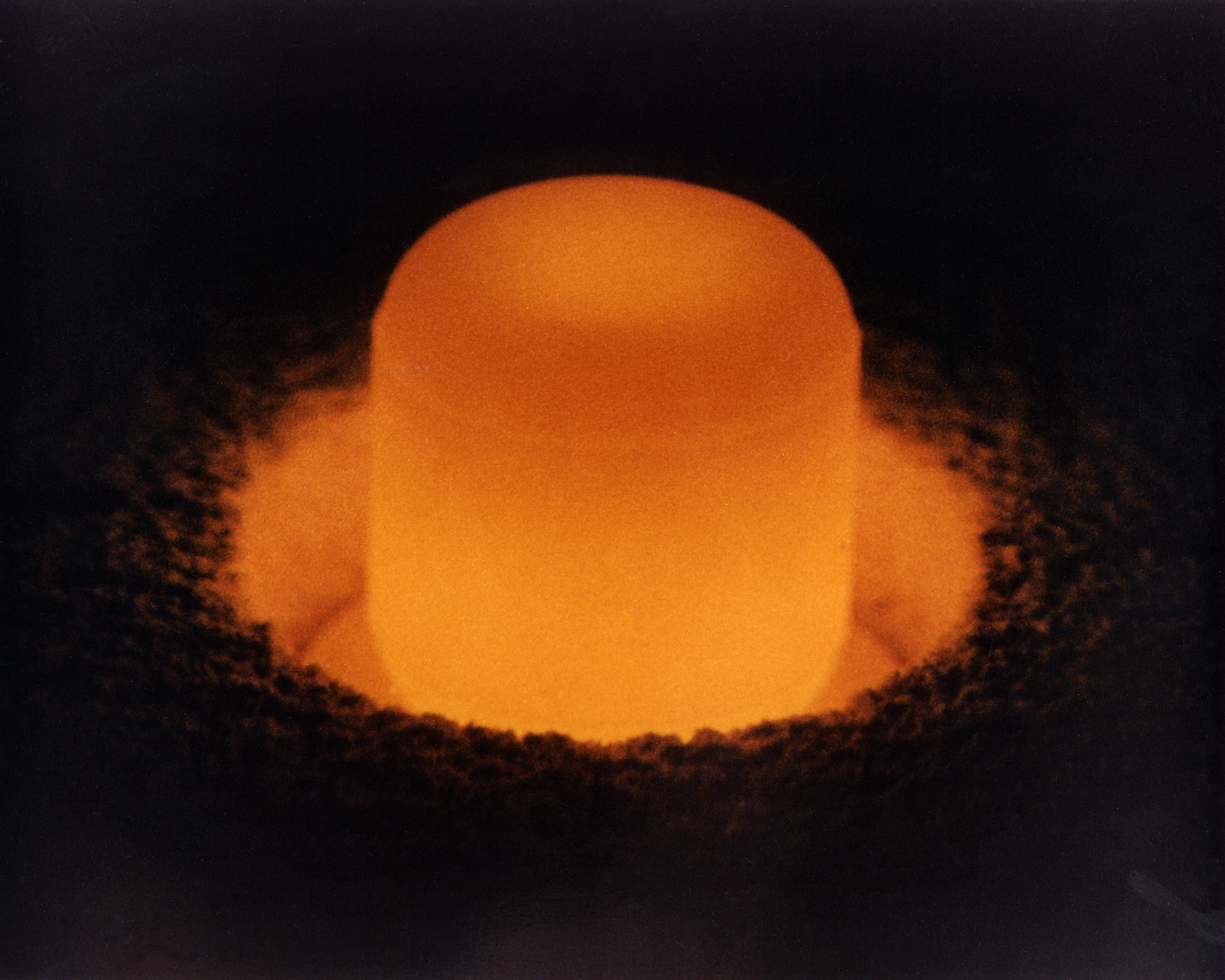
A pellet of dioxide of plutonium-238 displays incandescence after prolonged time of thermal isolation under asbestos.

PuO_{2}, along with UO_{2}, is used in MOX fuels for nuclear reactors. Plutonium-238 dioxide is used as fuel for several deep-space spacecraft such as the Cassini, Voyager, Galileo and New Horizons probes as well as in the Curiosity and Perseverance rovers on Mars. The isotope decays by emitting α-particles, which then generate heat (see radioisotope thermoelectric generator). There have been concerns that an accidental re-entry into Earth's atmosphere from orbit might lead to the break-up and/or burn-up of a spacecraft, resulting in the dispersal of the plutonium, either over a large tract of the planetary surface or within the upper atmosphere. However, although at least two spacecraft carrying PuO_{2} RTGs have reentered the Earth's atmosphere and burned up (Nimbus B-1 in May 1968 and the Apollo 13 Lunar Module in April 1970), the RTGs from both spacecraft survived reentry and impact intact, and no environmental contamination was noted in either instance; in fact, the Nimbus RTG was recovered intact from the Pacific Ocean seafloor and launched aboard Nimbus 3 one year later. In any case, RTGs since the mid-1960s have been designed to remain intact in the event of reentry and impact, following the 1964 launch failure of Transit 5-BN-3 (the early-generation plutonium RTG on board disintegrated upon reentry and dispersed radioactive material into the atmosphere north of Madagascar, prompting a redesign of all U.S. RTGs then in use or under development).

Physicist Peter Zimmerman, following up a suggestion by Ted Taylor, calculated that a low-yield (1-kiloton) nuclear weapon could be made relatively easily from plutonium dioxide. Such bomb would require a considerably larger critical mass than one made from elemental plutonium (almost three times larger, even with the dioxide at maximum crystal density; if the dioxide were in powder form, as is often encountered, the critical mass would be much higher still), due both to the lower density of plutonium in dioxide compared with elemental plutonium and to the added inert mass of the oxygen contained.

== Toxicology ==
The behavior of plutonium dioxide in the body varies with the way in which it is taken. When ingested, most of it will be eliminated from the body quite rapidly in body wastes, but a small part will dissolve into ions in acidic gastric juice and cross the blood barrier, depositing itself in other chemical forms in other organs such as in phagocytic cells of lung, bone marrow and liver.

In particulate form, plutonium dioxide at a particle size less than 10 μm is radiotoxic if inhaled due to its strong alpha-emission.

== See also ==
- International Atomic Energy Agency
- Uranium dioxide
