= Americium compounds =

Americium compounds are compounds containing the element americium (Am). These compounds can form in the +2, +3, and +4, although the +3 oxidation state is the most common. The +5, +6 and +7 oxidation states have also been reported.

== Oxides ==
Three americium oxides are known, with the oxidation states +2 (AmO), +3 (Am_{2}O_{3}), and +4 (AmO_{2}). Americium(II) oxide was prepared in minute amounts and has not been characterized in detail. Americium(III) oxide is a red-brown solid with a melting point of 2205 °C. Americium(IV) oxide is the main form of solid americium which is used in nearly all its applications. Like most other actinide dioxides, it is a black solid with a cubic (fluorite) crystal structure.

The oxalate of americium(III), vacuum dried at room temperature, has the chemical formula Am_{2}(C_{2}O_{4})_{3}·7H_{2}O. Upon heating in vacuum, it loses water at 240 °C and starts decomposing into AmO_{2} at 300 °C, the decomposition completes at about 470 °C. The initial oxalate dissolves in nitric acid with the maximum solubility of 0.25 g/L.

== Halides ==
Halides of americium are known for the oxidation states +2, +3, and +4, where the +3 is most stable, especially in solutions.

Oxidation state	F	Cl	Br	I
+4	Americium(IV) fluoride AmF_{4} pale pink			
+3	Americium(III) fluoride AmF_{3} pink	Americium(III) chloride AmCl_{3} pink	Americium(III) bromide AmBr_{3} light yellow	Americium(III) iodide AmI_{3} light yellow
+2		Americium(II) chloride AmCl_{2} black	Americium(II) bromide AmBr_{2} black	Americium(II) iodide AmI_{2} black

Reduction of Am(III) compounds with sodium amalgam yields Am(II) salts – the black halides AmCl_{2}, AmBr_{2}, and AmI_{2}. They are very sensitive to oxygen and oxidize in water, releasing hydrogen and converting back to the Am(III) state. Specific lattice constants are:

- Orthorhombic AmCl_{2}: a = 896.3±0.8 pm, b = 757.3±0.8 pm and c = 453.2±0.6 pm
- Tetragonal AmBr_{2}: a = 1159.2±0.4 pm and c = 712.1±0.3 pm. They can also be prepared by reacting metallic americium with an appropriate mercury halide HgX_{2}, where X = Cl, Br, or I:

Am + HgX_{2} (mercury halide) → AmX_{2} + Hg (at 400–500 °C)

Americium(III) fluoride (AmF_{3}) is poorly soluble and precipitates upon reaction of Am^{+}_{3} and fluoride ions in weak acidic solutions:

Am^{+}_{3} + 3F^{−} → AmF_{3}↓

The tetravalent americium(IV) fluoride (AmF_{4}) is obtained by reacting solid americium(III) fluoride with molecular fluorine:

2AmF_{3} + F_{2} → 2AmF_{4}

Another known form of solid tetravalent americium fluoride is KAmF_{5}. Tetravalent americium has also been observed in the aqueous phase. For this purpose, black Am(OH)_{4} was dissolved in 15-M NH_{4}F with the americium concentration of 0.01 M. The resulting reddish solution had a characteristic optical absorption spectrum which is similar to that of AmF_{4} but differed from other oxidation states of americium. Heating the Am(IV) solution to 90 °C did not result in its disproportionation or reduction, however a slow reduction was observed to Am(III) and assigned to self-irradiation of americium by alpha particles.

Most americium(III) halides form hexagonal crystals with slight variation of the color and exact structure between the halogens. So, chloride (AmCl_{3}) is reddish and has a structure isotypic to uranium(III) chloride (space group P6_{3}/m) and the melting point of 715 °C. The fluoride is isotypic to LaF_{3} (space group P6_{3}/mmc) and the iodide to BiI_{3} (space group R3̅). The bromide is an exception with the orthorhombic PuBr_{3}-type structure and space group Cmcm. Crystals of americium chloride hexahydrate (AmCl_{3}·6H_{2}O) can be prepared by dissolving americium dioxide in hydrochloric acid and evaporating the liquid. Those crystals are hygroscopic and have yellow-reddish color and a monoclinic crystal structure.

Oxyhalides of americium in the form Am^{VI}O_{2}X_{2}, Am^{V}O_{2}X, Am^{IV}OX_{2}, and Am^{III}OX can be obtained by reacting the corresponding americium halide with oxygen or Sb_{2}O_{3}, and AmOCl can also be produced by vapor phase hydrolysis:

AmCl_{3} + H_{2}O → AmOCl + 2HCl

== Other inorganic compounds ==
=== Hydroxide ===
The only known hydroxide of americium is Am(OH)_{3}, which is the first compound of americium, discovered in 1944 as part of the Manhattan Project. Americium hydroxide is a pink solid which is sparingly soluble in water.

Due to self-irradiation, the crystal structure of ^{241}Am(OH)_{3} decomposes within 4 to 6 months (^{241}Am has a half-life of 432.2 years); for ^{244}Cm(OH)_{3} the same process takes less than a day (^{244}Cm has a half-life of 18.11 years).

When ozone is bubbled through a slurry of americium(III) hydroxide in 0.03 M potassium bicarbonate at 92 °C, hexagonal KAmO_{2}CO_{3} (potassium dioxoamericium(V) carbonate) can be obtained. Potassium carbonate can also be used. The resulting KAmO_{2}CO_{3} reacts with dilute acids to produce americium dioxide:

O_{3} + Am(OH)_{3} + KHCO_{3} + H_{2}O → KAmO_{2}CO_{3} + 3H_{2}O + O_{2}

=== Chalcogenides and pnictides ===
The known chalcogenides of americium include the sulfide AmS_{2}, selenides AmSe_{2} and Am_{3}Se_{4}, and tellurides Am_{2}Te_{3} and AmTe_{2}. The pnictides of americium (^{243}Am) of the AmX type are known for the elements phosphorus, arsenic, antimony, and bismuth. They crystallize in the rock-salt lattice.

=== Silicides and borides ===
Americium monosilicide (AmSi) and "disilicide" (nominally AmSi_{x}, with 1.87 < x < 2.0) were obtained by reduction of americium(III) fluoride with elementary silicon in vacuum at 1050 °C (AmSi) and 1150−1200 °C (AmSi_{x}). AmSi is a black solid isomorphic with LaSi, it has an orthorhombic crystal symmetry. AmSi_{x} has a bright silvery lustre and a tetragonal crystal lattice (space group I4_{1}/amd), it is isomorphic with PuSi_{2} and ThSi_{2}. Borides of americium include AmB_{4} and AmB_{6}. The tetraboride can be obtained by heating an oxide or halide of americium with magnesium diboride in vacuum or inert atmosphere.

== Organoamericium compounds ==
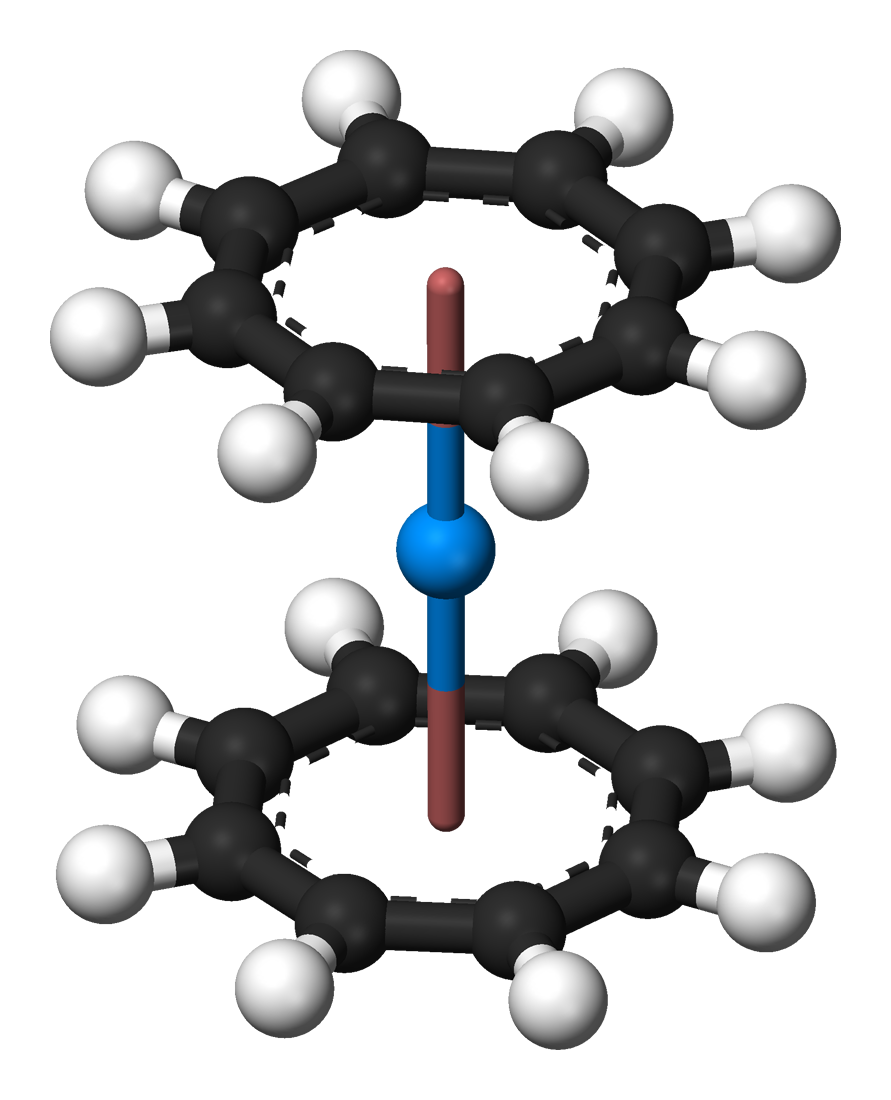
Predicted structure of amerocene, (η^{8}-C_{8}H_{8})_{2}Am

Analogous to uranocene, americium forms the organometallic compound amerocene with two cyclooctatetraene ligands, with the chemical formula (η^{8}-C_{8}H_{8})_{2}Am, but it is still hypothetical up to date. An anionic complex KAm(COT)_{2} can be prepared by reacting K_{2}COT and AmI_{3} in THF. A cyclopentadienyl complex is also known that is likely to be stoichiometrically AmCp_{3}. Isolation of organometallic Am complexes has been historically challenging because suitable non-aqueous precursor materials required for their synthesis have been difficult to access. However, advances in non-aqueous transuranium chemistry has led to the development of suitable halide precursors, such as AmX_{3}(DME)_{n} (X = Cl, Br), AmBr_{3}(THF)_{4}, and AmI_{3}(THF)_{x} (where x has been assumed to be 4). Consequently, the first examples of structurally-authenticated cyclopentadienyl complexes of Am, including [Am(C_{5}Me_{4}H)_{3}], AmCp'_{3} (Cp' = trimethylsilylcyclopentadienide), (Cp′_{3}Am)_{2}(μ − 4,4′−bpy), (C_{5}Me_{5})_{2}Am(X)(I^{Me4})] (C_{5}Me_{5}, also commonly known as Cp* = pentamethylcyclopentadienyl; X = Cl/I; I^{Me4} = N-heterocyclic carbene) and (C_{5}Me_{5})_{2}Am(^{t}Bu_{2}bipy) have been isolated and characterized.

Formation of the complexes of the type Am(n−C_{3}H_{7}−BTP)_{3}, where BTP stands for 2,6-di(1,2,4-triazin-3-yl)pyridine, in solutions containing n−C_{3}H_{7}−BTP^{−} and Am^{+}_{3} ions has been confirmed by EXAFS. Some of these BTP-type complexes selectively interact with americium and therefore are useful in its selective separation from lanthanides and another actinides.

== See also ==
- Europium compounds
- Curium compounds
