= Americium oxide =

Americium oxide may refer to:

- Americium dioxide
- Americium(III) oxide

== See also ==
- Americium(III) hydroxide
