= Curium compounds =

Curium (Cm) usually forms compounds in the +3 oxidation state, although compounds with curium in the +4, +5 and +6 oxidation states are also known.

== Oxides ==
Curium readily reacts with oxygen forming mostly Cm_{2}O_{3} and CmO_{2} oxides, but the divalent oxide CmO is also known. Black CmO_{2} can be obtained by burning curium oxalate (Cm_{2}(C_{2}O_{4})_{3}), nitrate (Cm(NO_{3})_{3}), or hydroxide in pure oxygen. Upon heating to 600–650 °C in vacuum (about 0.01 Pa), it transforms into the whitish Cm_{2}O_{3}:

4CmO_{2} → 2Cm_{2}O_{3} + O_{2}.

Or, Cm_{2}O_{3} can be obtained by reducing CmO_{2} with molecular hydrogen:

2CmO_{2} + H_{2} → Cm_{2}O_{3} + H_{2}O

Also, a number of ternary oxides of the type M(II)CmO_{3} are known, where M stands for a divalent metal, such as barium.

Thermal oxidation of trace quantities of curium hydride (CmH_{2–3}) has been reported to give a volatile form of CmO_{2} and the volatile trioxide CmO_{3}, one of two known examples of the very rare +6 state for curium. Another observed species was reported to behave similar to a supposed plutonium tetroxide and was tentatively characterized as CmO_{4}, with curium in the extremely rare +8 state; but new experiments seem to indicate that CmO_{4} does not exist, and have cast doubt on the existence of PuO_{4} as well.

== Halides ==
The colorless curium(III) fluoride (CmF_{3}) can be made by adding fluoride ions into curium(III)-containing solutions. The brown tetravalent curium(IV) fluoride (CmF_{4}) on the other hand is only obtained by reacting curium(III) fluoride with molecular fluorine:

2 CmF_{3} + F_{2} → 2 CmF_{4}

A series of ternary fluorides are known of the form A_{7}Cm_{6}F_{31} (A = alkali metal).

The colorless curium(III) chloride (CmCl_{3}) is made by reacting curium hydroxide (Cm(OH)_{3}) with anhydrous hydrogen chloride gas. It can be further turned into other halides such as curium(III) bromide (colorless to light green) and curium(III) iodide (colorless), by reacting it with the ammonia salt of the corresponding halide at temperatures of ~400–450°C:

CmCl_{3} + 3 NH_{4}I → CmI_{3} + 3 NH_{4}Cl

Or, one can heat curium oxide to ~600°C with the corresponding acid (such as hydrobromic for curium bromide). Vapor phase hydrolysis of curium(III) chloride gives curium oxychloride:

CmCl_{3} + H_{2}O → CmOCl + 2 HCl

== Chalcogenides and pnictides ==
Sulfides, selenides and tellurides of curium have been obtained by treating curium with gaseous sulfur, selenium or tellurium in vacuum at elevated temperature. Curium pnictides of the type CmX are known for nitrogen, phosphorus, arsenic and antimony. They can be prepared by reacting either curium(III) hydride (CmH_{3}) or metallic curium with these elements at elevated temperature.

== Organocurium compounds and biological aspects ==
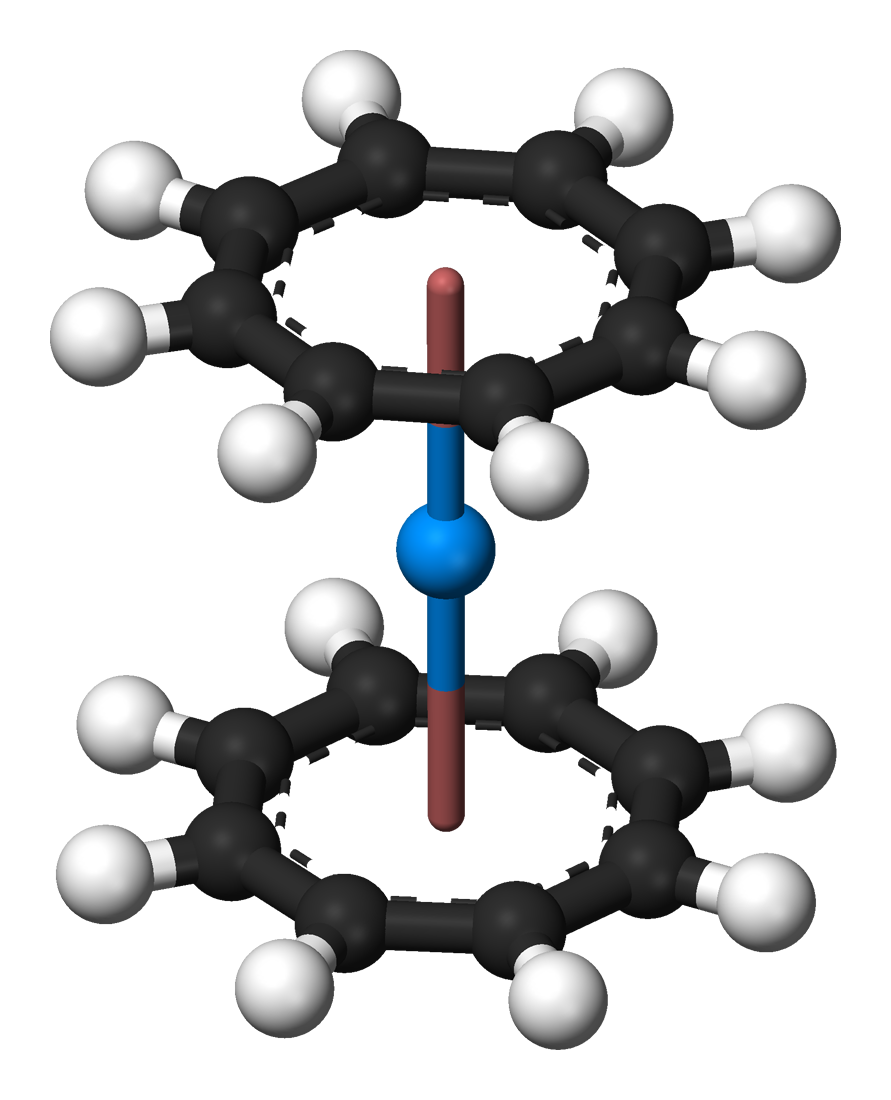
Predicted curocene structure

Organometallic complexes analogous to uranocene are known also for other actinides, such as thorium, protactinium, neptunium, plutonium and berkelium. Molecular orbital theory predicts a stable "curocene" complex (η^{8}-C_{8}H_{8})_{2}Cm, but it has not been reported experimentally yet.

Formation of the complexes of the type Cm(n-C_{3}H_{7}-BTP)_{3} (BTP = 2,6-di(1,2,4-triazin-3-yl)pyridine), in solutions containing n-C_{3}H_{7}-BTP and Cm^{3+} ions has been confirmed by EXAFS. Some of these BTP-type complexes selectively interact with curium and thus are useful for separating it from lanthanides and another actinides. Dissolved Cm^{3+} ions bind with many organic compounds, such as hydroxamic acid, urea, fluorescein and adenosine triphosphate. Many of these compounds are related to biological activity of various microorganisms. The resulting complexes show strong yellow-orange emission under UV light excitation, which is convenient not only for their detection, but also for studying interactions between the Cm^{3+} ion and the ligands via changes in the half-life (of the order ~0.1 ms) and spectrum of the fluorescence.

Curium has no biological significance. There are a few reports on biosorption of Cm^{3+} by bacteria and archaea, but no evidence for incorporation of curium into them.

== See also ==
- Berkelium compounds
- Californium compounds
