= Curium(IV) oxide =

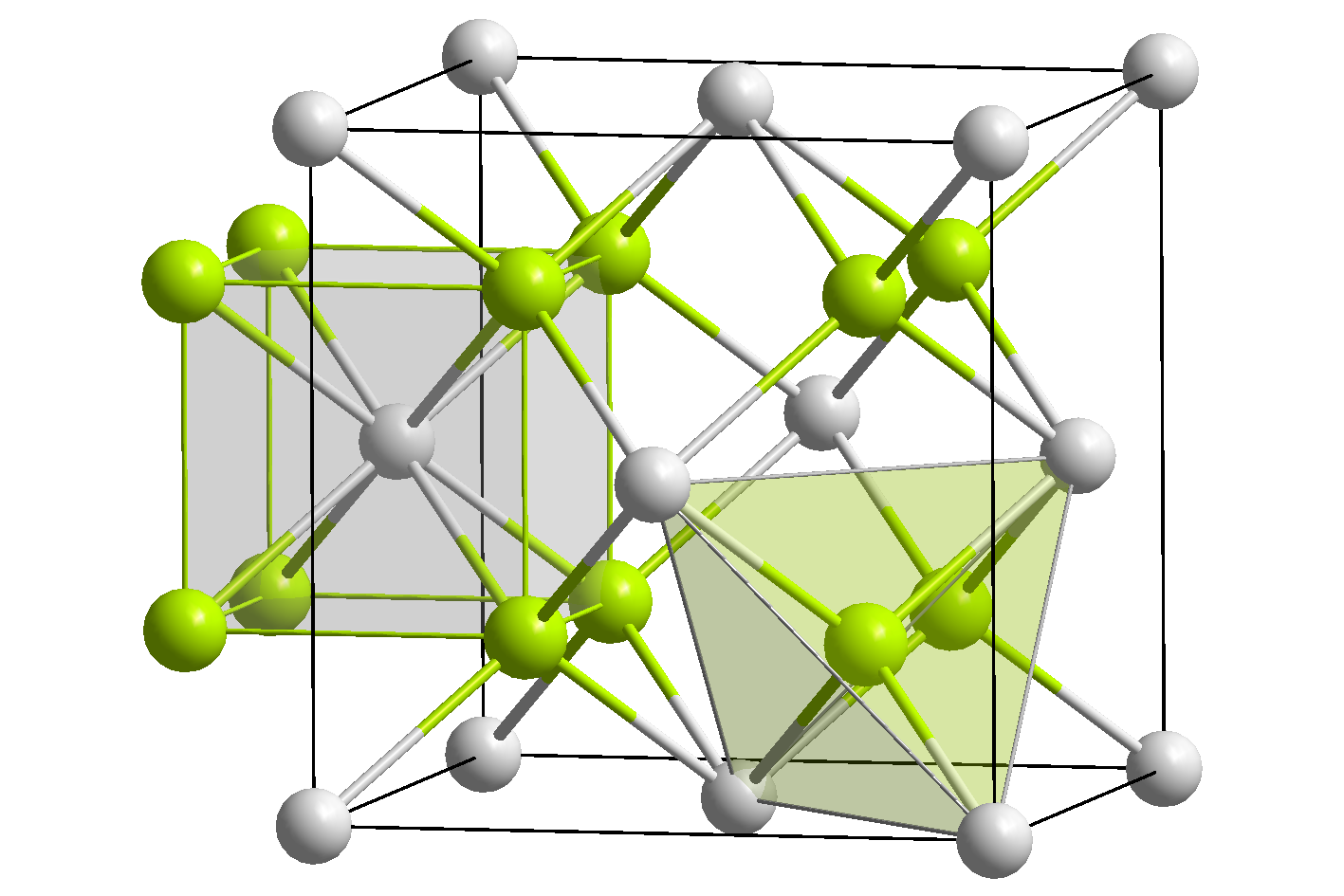

Names
- Other names Curium dioxide

Identifiers
CAS Number	12016-67-0
3D model (JSmol)	Interactive image
ChemSpider	34998496
ECHA InfoCard	100.031.453
EC Number	234-612-6
PubChem CID	118856359 (charge error)
- InChI: InChI=1S/Cm.2O/q+4;2*-2 Key: GAFRKXHDERQHAP-UHFFFAOYSA-N
- SMILES: [O-2].[O-2].[Cm+4]

Properties
Chemical formula	CmO_{2}
Molar mass	279 g·mol^{−1}
Appearance	black crystals
Solubility in water	insoluble

Related compounds
Other cations	Americium(IV) oxide Berkelium(IV) oxide
- Except where otherwise noted, data are given for materials in their standard state (at 25 °C [77 °F], 100 kPa). Infobox references

Curium(IV) oxide is an inorganic chemical compound of curium and oxygen with the chemical formula CmO_{2}. Since all isotopes of curium are man-made, the compound does not occur in nature.

== Synthesis ==
- Curium(IV) oxide can be prepared directly from the elements. Metallic curium is annealed in air or in an oxygen atmosphere:

Cm + O_{2} → CmO_{2}

- Curium(III) hydroxide and curium(III) oxalate are also usually used for this purpose:

Cm(OH)_{4} → CmO_{2} + 2H_{2}O

Cm(C_{2}O_{4})_{2} → CmO_{2} + 2CO_{2} + 2CO

- Another way is the reaction of curium(III) oxide in an oxygen atmosphere at 650 °C:

2Cm_{2}O_{3} + O_{2} → 4CmO_{2}

== Physical properties ==
Curium(IV) oxide forms black crystals. Insoluble in water. The compound crystals are of the cubic crystal system, the fluorite structure in the space group Fm3m.

== Chemical properties ==
The compound reacts with mineral acids to form solutions of curium(III) salts.

== Uses ==
The compound is used for the manufacturing of isotopic current sources, also as targets for the synthesis of transcurium elements.
