= Curium(III) oxide =

- Unit cell, ball and stick model of curium(III) oxide

Names
- IUPAC name Curium(III) oxide
- Systematic IUPAC name Curium(3+) oxide
- Other names Curic oxide Curium sesquioxide Curium trioxide

Identifiers
CAS Number	12371-27-6
3D model (JSmol)	Interactive image
CompTox Dashboard (EPA)	DTXSID60894780
- InChI: InChI=1S/2Cm.3O/q2*+3;3*-2 Key: TYZFTGHDCPRRBH-UHFFFAOYSA-N
- SMILES: [O-2].[O-2].[O-2].[Cm+3].[Cm+3]

Properties
Chemical formula	Cm_{2}O_{3}
Molar mass	542 g·mol^{−1}
Melting point	2,265 °C (4,109 °F; 2,538 K)

Structure
Crystal structure	Hexagonal, hP5, Body-Centered Cubic, Monoclinic
Space group	P-3m1, No. 164

Related compounds
Other cations	Gadolinium(III) oxide, Curium hydroxide, Curium trifluoride, Curium Tetrafluoride, Curium Trichloride, Curium Triiodide
- Except where otherwise noted, data are given for materials in their standard state (at 25 °C [77 °F], 100 kPa). verify (what is ?) Infobox references

Curium(III) oxide is a compound composed of curium and oxygen with the chemical formula Cm_{2}O_{3}. It is a crystalline solid with a unit cell that contains two curium atoms and three oxygen atoms. The simplest synthesis equation involves the reaction of curium(III) metal with O^{2−}: 2 Cm^{3+} + 3 O^{2−} ---> Cm_{2}O_{3}. Curium trioxide can exist as five polymorphic forms. Two of the forms exist at extremely high temperatures, making it difficult for experimental studies to be done on the formation of their structures. The three other possible forms which curium sesquioxide can take are the body-centered cubic form, the monoclinic form, and the hexagonal form. Curium(III) oxide is either white or light tan in color and, while insoluble in water, is soluble in inorganic and mineral acids. Its synthesis was first recognized in 1955.

== Synthesis ==
Curium sesquioxide can be prepared in a variety of ways.

- Ignition with O_{2}: Curium(III) oxalate is precipitated through a capillary tube. The precipitate is ignited by gaseous oxygen at 400 °C, and the resulting product is thermally decomposed via 600 °C and 10^{−4} mm of pressure.
- Aerosolized curium sesquioxide: The aerosolization process of Cm_{2}O_{3} can be done through multiple experimental processes. Typically, Cm_{2}O_{3} is aerosolized for experimental procedures which set out to discover the effects of curium metal within a biological system.

Route 1: The traditional aerosolization reaction utilizes curium metal as the starting material. While curium metal has been discovered to naturally exist as a mixture of 87.4% ^{244}Cm, 8.4% ^{243}Cm, 3.9% other curium isotopes, and ~0.3% of the daughter nuclide, plutonium, in most aerosolized syntheses of curium(III) oxide, curium metal is purified through solvent extraction of curium nitrate and bis(2-ethylhexyl) phosphoric acid in toluene to remove the plutonium. NH_{3}OH is then added to the purified curium nitrate, and the resulting precipitate is collected and rinsed with deionized water. The precipitate (Cm_{2}O_{3}) is resuspended in solvent and aerosolized with some sort of high output aerosol generator (ex: Lovelace nebulizer).

Route 2: In other aerosolizations, instead of the addition of NH_{3}OH to the purified curium nitrate, ammonium hydroxide is utilized to adjust the pH value of the solution to 9. The increased basicity of the solution creates a curium hydroxide precipitate. This precipitate is then collected through filtration and resuspended in deionized water, and a nebulizer is then used to aerosolize the product.

- Reduction by Hydrogen Gas: A solution of curium trichloride is evaporated to dryness with pure nitric acid to produce curium nitrate. The curium nitrate is then ignited in air, producing curium oxide, believed to be an intermediate structure between CmO_{2} and the formation of Cm_{2}O_{3}. The intermediate is scraped into capillary tubes attached to a vacuum system and reduced with gaseous hydrogen - the result of the combustion of UH_{3}.

== Structure ==
The body-centered cubic and monoclinic forms are the most common polymorphic forms of curium trioxide, produced by the chemical reactions detailed above. Their crystalline structures are very similar. One of the polymorphs of curium trioxide - the body-centered cubic form - spontaneously transforms to the hexagonal form after several weeks. This transformation is undergone upon spontaneous ^{244}Cm alpha decay, which produces radiation damage effects within the cubic crystal lattice to distort it to that of hexagonal. Although not experimentally proven, there is speculation that monoclinic curium trioxide may be an intermediate form in between the transformation of the cubic form to that of the hexagonal. The body-centered cubic form of curium trioxide exists below temperatures of 800 °C, the monoclinic form between 800 °C and 1615 °C, and the hexagonal form above 1615 °C.

== Crystallography ==
The lattice parameters for three of the polymorphic structures of curium sesquioxide are given below.

Hexagonal:

Data Table	Temperature (°C)	Lengths of a (Å)	Uncertainty (Å)	Lengths of c (Å)	Uncertainty (Å)
	1615	3.845	0.005	6.092	0.005
	--*	3.496	0.003	11.331	0.005

(*: No specific temperature has been stated to produce the lengths listed in the second row.)

Monoclinic:

Data Table	Temperature (°C)	Lengths of a (Å)	Lengths of b (Å)	Lengths of c (Å)
	21	14.257**	8.92**	3.65**

(**: None of these lengths contained given uncertainties.)

Cubic:

Data Table	Temperature (°C)	Lengths of a (Å)	Uncertainty (Å)
	21	10.97	0.01

== Data ==
Ever since the discovery (and isolation) of ^{248}Cm, the most stable curium isotope, experimental work on the thermodynamic properties of curium sesquioxide (and other curium compounds) has become more prevalent. However, ^{248}Cm can only be obtained in mg samples, so data collection for ^{248}Cm-containing compounds takes longer than that for compounds which predominantly contain other curium isotopes. The data table below reflects a large variety of data collected specifically for curium sesquioxide, some of which is purely theoretical, but most of which have been obtained from ^{248}Cm-compounds.

Ground State F-Configuration for Metal	Approximate Melting Point (°C)	Magnetic Susceptibility (μb)	Uncertainty (μb)	Enthalpy of Formation (kJ/mol)	Uncertainty (kJ/mol)	Average Standard Molar Entropy (J/molK)	Uncertainty (J/molK)
f^{7} (Cm^{3+})	2265*	7.89**	0.04**	-400**	5**	157***	5***

(*: Different syntheses of curium trioxide have been shown to produce compounds with different experimental melting points. The melting point given in this data table is merely an average of those collected from the references.)

(**: Characteristic of the monoclinic form.)

(***: Various experiments have calculated different estimates of the standard molar entropy for curium trioxide: Moskin has reported a standard molar entropy of 144.3 J/molK (no given uncertainty). Westrum and Grønvold have reported a value of 160.7 J/molK (no given uncertainty), and Konings’ value is reported to be 167 +/- 5 J/molK.)

== Toxicology ==
Curium metal is a radionuclide and emits alpha particles upon radioactive decay. Although it has a half-life of 34 ms, many curium oxides, including curium sesquioxide, have half-lives nearing thousands of years. Curium, in the form of curium sesquioxide, can be inhaled into the body, causing many biological defects. The LD50 of curium is 3 micro-Ci through ingestion and inhalation and 1 micro-Ci through absorption through the skin. In one experiment, rats were introduced to aerosolized particulates of curium(III) oxide. Although the experiment proved that inhaled ^{244}Cm_{2}O_{3} is half as carcinogenic as compared to inhaled ^{239}PuO_{2}, the rats still suffered from many biological deformities, such as skin lesions, malignant tumors, and lung neoplasms. A small amount of the rat population was able to clear particulate curium sesquioxide from the lungs, suggesting that curium sesquioxide is partially soluble in lung fluid.

== Applications ==
Curium(III) oxide is heavily used in industrial grade-reactions and reagents. As recently as 2009, actinide oxides, such as curium sesquioxide, are being considered for storage uses (in the form of heavily durable ceramic glassware) for the transportation of the light-and-air sensitive fission and transmutation target substances.

== Other reactions ==
Curium sesquioxide will spontaneously react with gaseous oxygen at high temperatures. At lower temperatures, a spontaneous reaction will occur over a period of time. Curium trioxide reacted with water has been hypothesized to afford a hydration reaction, but little experimentation has been done to prove the hypothesis. Curium sesquioxide has been shown to not react with nitrogen gas, spontaneously or non-spontaneously.

== See also ==
- Curium hydroxide
- Curium
- Oxide
- Inorganic chemistry
- Radionuclide
- Radiation
