= Curium nitride =

Names
- Other names Curium mononitride

Identifiers
CAS Number	70420-41-6
3D model (JSmol)	Interactive image
- InChI: InChI=S/Cm.N Key: QOWDCAQCEKNZNK-UHFFFAOYSA-N
- SMILES: [Cm]#N

Properties
Chemical formula	CmN
Molar mass	261 g·mol^{−1}
Appearance	solid
- Except where otherwise noted, data are given for materials in their standard state (at 25 °C [77 °F], 100 kPa). Infobox references

Curium nitride is a binary inorganic compound of curium and nitrogen with the chemical formula CmN.

== Synthesis ==
Curium nitride can be prepared by carbothermic nitridation of the oxide.

== Physical properties ==
Curium nitride is solid and has a NaCl structure. It is ferromagnetic.
