= Americium(III) hydroxide =

Names
- IUPAC name Americium(III) hydroxide
- Systematic IUPAC name Americium(3+) trihydroxide
- Other names Americium hydroxide Americium trihydroxide

Identifiers
CAS Number	23323-79-7
3D model (JSmol)	Interactive image
ChemSpider	57568563
PubChem CID	15779366
CompTox Dashboard (EPA)	DTXSID70578221
- InChI: InChI=1S/Am.3H2O/h;3*1H2/p-3 Key: YWUZEQVAJGTDDQ-UHFFFAOYSA-K
- SMILES: [OH-].[OH-].[OH-].[Am+3]

Properties
Chemical formula	Am(OH)_{3}
Molar mass	294.084 g/mol

Hazards
- Occupational safety and health (OHS/OSH)
Main hazards	Radiation
NFPA 704 (fire diamond)	

Related compounds
Other anions	Americium(III) oxide Americium(III) chloride Americium(III) bromide
Other cations	Curium(III) hydroxide Europium(III) hydroxide
- Except where otherwise noted, data are given for materials in their standard state (at 25 °C [77 °F], 100 kPa). Infobox references

Americium(III) hydroxide is a radioactive inorganic compound with the chemical formula Am(OH)_{3}. It consists of one americium atom and three hydroxy groups. It was first discovered in 1944, closely related to the Manhattan Project. However, these results were confidential and were only released to the public in 1945. It was the first isolated sample of an americium compound, and the first americium compound discovered.

== Properties ==
Americium hydroxide is a pink solid which is sparingly soluble in water.

Due to self-irradiation, the crystal structure of ^{241}Am(OH)_{3} decomposes within 4 to 6 months (^{241}Am has a half-life of 432.2 years); for ^{244}Cm(OH)_{3} the same process takes one day (^{244}Cm has a half-life of 18.11 years).

== Synthesis ==
Americium metal can be converted to Am(OH)_{3} in a four-step process. As described by the Oak Ridge National Laboratory, americium is added to hydrochloric acid, then neutralized using ammonium hydroxide (NH_{4}OH). A saturated oxalic acid solution is added to the now neutralized solution. This causes large americium oxalate crystals to begin to grow. Once complete precipitation is achieved, oxalic acid is once again added, to attain a slurry of americium oxalate and oxalic acid. The americium oxalate is then filtered out, washed with water, and is partially dried by allowing exposure to air.

Am + (COOH)_{2} → Am(COO)_{2}

The americium oxalate is then added to a platinum combustion boat to undergo calcination. The americium oxalate is dried in a furnace and will begin to decompose at 350 °C. When decomposition begins to occur, the oxalate will turn into the desired black americium dioxide. To ensure no oxalate remains in the americium dioxide, the oven temperature is increased to and held at 800 °C and then slowly allowed to cool to room temperature.

Am(COO)_{2} → AmO_{2}

The americium dioxide is heated again, to about 600 °C, in the presence of hydrogen, to produce americium(III) oxide.

2AmO_{2} + H_{2}O → Am_{2}O_{3} + O_{2} + H_{2}

The final step involves the hydrolysis of the americium(III) oxide, to produce the final product, americium(III) hydroxide.

Am_{2}O_{3} + 3H_{2}O → 2Am(OH)_{3}

== Reactions ==
When ozone is bubbled through a slurry of americium(III) hydroxide in 0.03 M potassium bicarbonate at 92 °C, hexagonal KAmO_{2}CO_{3} (potassium dioxoamericium(V) carbonate) can be obtained. Potassium carbonate can also be used. The resulting KAmO_{2}CO_{3} reacts with dilute acids to produce americium dioxide.

O_{3} + Am(OH)_{3} + KHCO_{3} + H_{2}O → KAmO_{2}CO_{3} + 3H_{2}O + O_{2}

In a dilute base such as sodium hypochlorite, Am(OH)_{3} gets oxidised to Am(OH)_{4}, which is black in solution. Further oxidation using ozone and sodium hydroxide can produce yellow hydroxy species of Am(VI).

== See also ==
- Curium hydroxide
