= Curium(III) iodide =

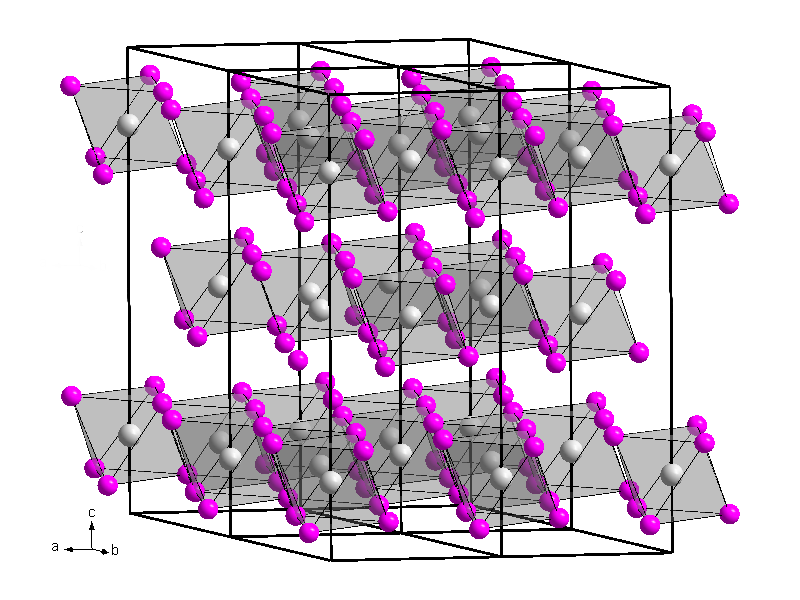

Names
- Other names Curium triiodide

Identifiers
CAS Number	14696-85-6
3D model (JSmol)	Interactive image
PubChem CID	101943143 (charge error)
- InChI: InChI=1S/Cm.3HI/h;3*1H/q+3;;;/p-3 Key: UVXBBRRWLDYFRE-UHFFFAOYSA-K
- SMILES: [I-].[I-].[I-].[Cm+3]

Properties
Chemical formula	CmI_{3}
Molar mass	628 g·mol^{−1}
Appearance	white crystals

Related compounds
Related compounds	Americium triiodide
- Except where otherwise noted, data are given for materials in their standard state (at 25 °C [77 °F], 100 kPa). Infobox references

Curium(III) iodide is a salt with the formula CmI_{3}. Since all isotopes of curium are only artificially produced, the compound has no natural occurrence.

== Synthesis ==
Elemental curium and iodine can be reacted to synthesize curium(III) iodide.

2Cm + 3I_{2} → 2CmI_{3}

Also by the reaction of curium(III) chloride with ammonium iodide:

CmCl_{3} + 3NH_{4}I → CmI_{3} + 3NH_{4}Cl

== Physical properties ==
Curium(III) iodide is a colorless ionic compound consisting of Cm^{3+} and I^{−} ions. It forms white crystals the hexagonal crystal system in the space group R_{3} (space group no. 148) with the lattice parameters a = 744 pm and c = 2040 pm with six units per unit cell. Its crystal structure is isotypic with that of bismuth(III) iodide.
