= Americium(III) oxide =

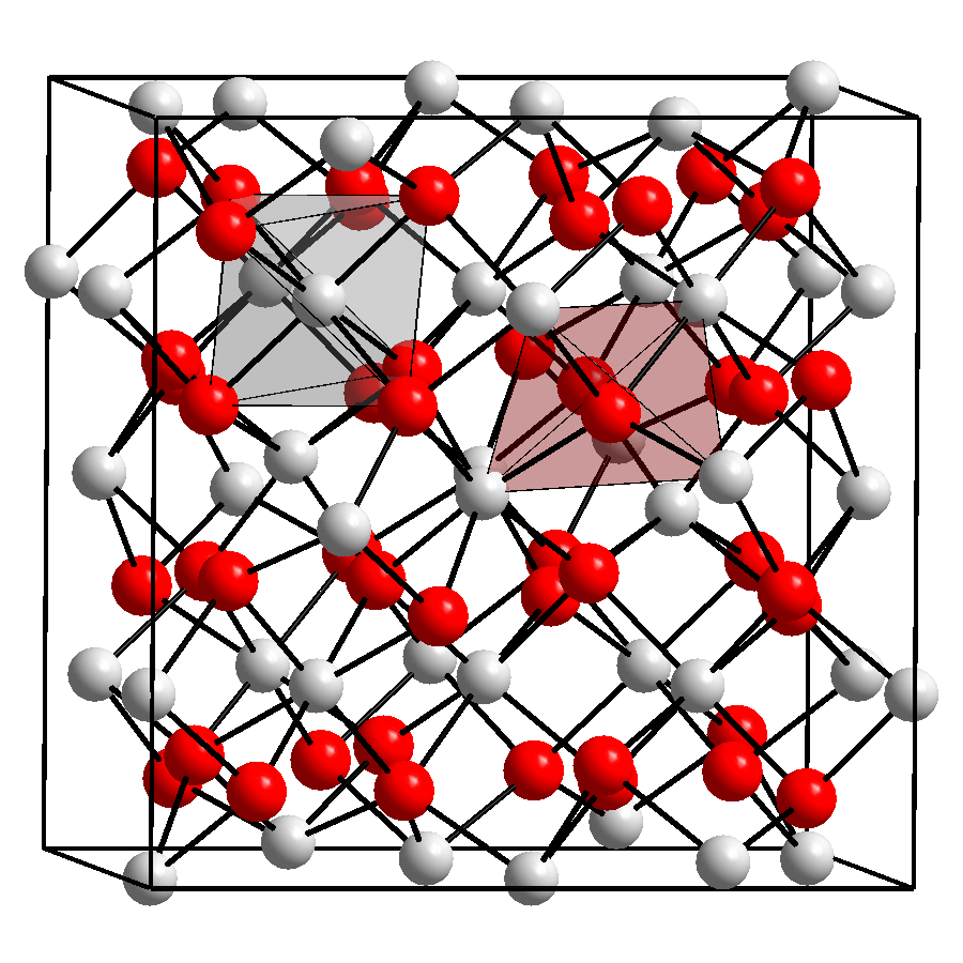

Names
- Other names Americium sesquioxide

Identifiers
CAS Number	12254-64-7
3D model (JSmol)	Interactive image
- InChI: InChI=1S/2Am.3O/q2*+3;3*-2 Key: HPWBMQLLXMZFDK-UHFFFAOYSA-N
- SMILES: [O-2].[O-2].[O-2].[Am+3].[Am+3]

Properties
Chemical formula	Am_{2}O_{3}
Molar mass	534 g·mol^{−1}
Density	11.77
Melting point	2,205 °C (4,001 °F; 2,478 K)

Structure
Crystal structure	Trigonal, hP5
Space group	P3̅m1, No. 164
Lattice constant	a = 381.7 pm, c = 597.1 pm

Related compounds
Other cations	Curium(III) oxide
Related compounds	Americium dioxide Americium(II) oxide
- Except where otherwise noted, data are given for materials in their standard state (at 25 °C [77 °F], 100 kPa). Infobox references

Americium(III) oxide or americium sesquioxide is an oxide of the element americium. It has the empirical formula Am_{2}O_{3}. Since all isotopes of americium are only artificially produced, americium(III) oxide has no natural occurrence. The colour depends on the crystal structure, of which there are more than one. It is soluble in acids.

== Formation ==
Americium(III) oxide can be made by heating americium dioxide in hydrogen at 600°C.

2 AmO_{2} + H_{2} → Am_{2}O_{3} + H_{2}O

== Forms ==
The hexagonal form is coloured tan, and the cubic form is coloured red-brown the same as persimmon. The cubic form converts to the hexagonal form on heating to 800°C. The cubic form is non-stoichiometric with variable oxygen composition. It darkens with increasing oxygen.
