= Curium(III) chloride =

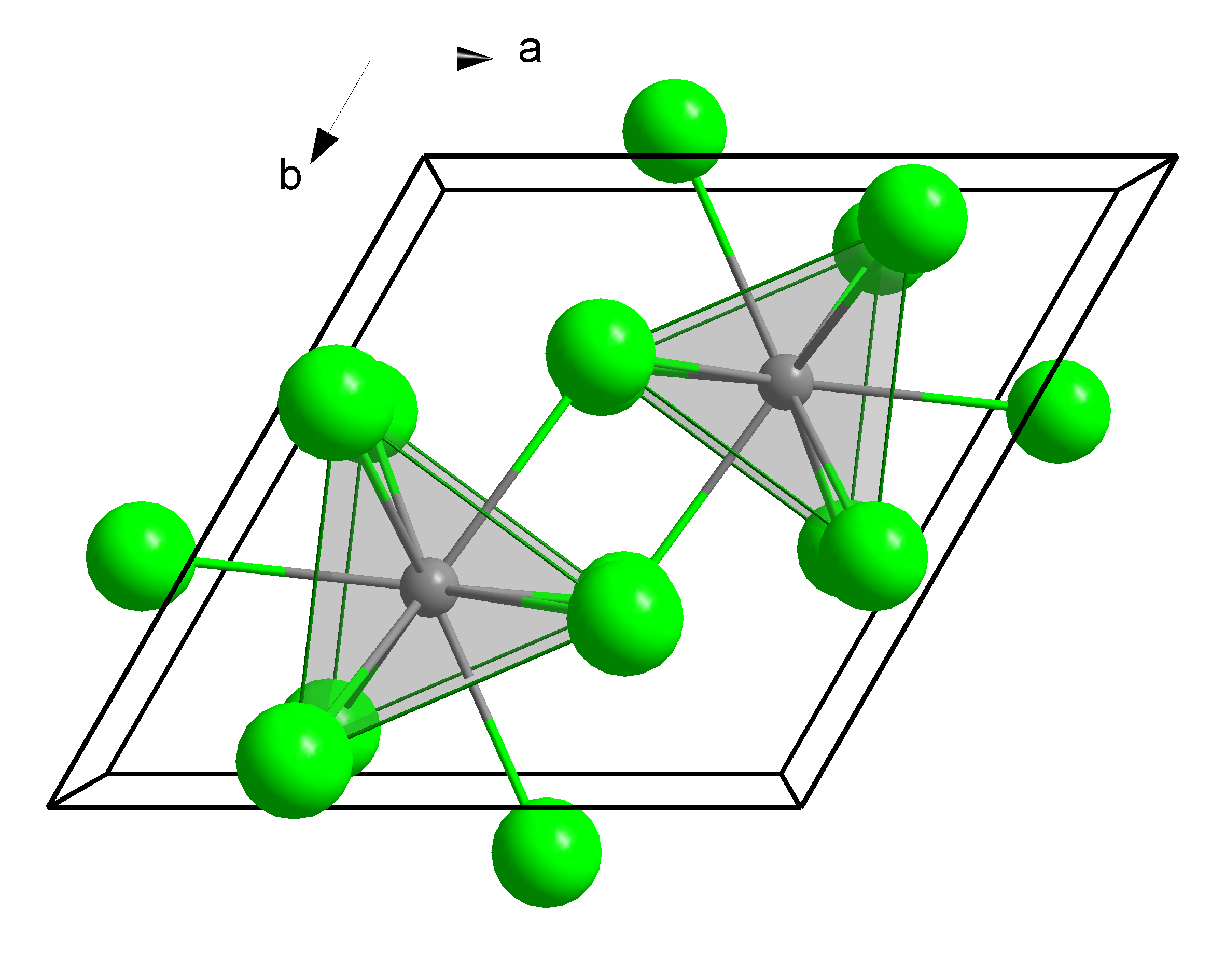
- Crystal structure

Identifiers
CAS Number	13537-20-7
3D model (JSmol)	Interactive image
PubChem CID	57418588
- InChI: InChI=1S/3ClH.Cm/h3*1H;/q;;;+3/p-3 Key: PTLGMSBPLOHNBD-UHFFFAOYSA-K
- SMILES: Cl[Cm](Cl)Cl

Properties
Chemical formula	Cl_{3}Cm
Molar mass	353 g·mol^{−1}
Appearance	White solid (anhydrous); Light green solid (hydrate)
Melting point	695 °C (1,283 °F; 968 K)
- Except where otherwise noted, data are given for materials in their standard state (at 25 °C [77 °F], 100 kPa). Infobox references

Curium(III) chloride or curium trichloride is a actinide chemical compound with the chemical formula CmCl_{3}.

== Structure ==
Curium(III) chloride has a 9 coordinate tricapped trigonal prismatic geometry.

== Synthesis ==
Curium(III) chloride can be obtained from the reaction of hydrogen chloride gas with curium dioxide, curium(III) oxide, or curium(III) oxychloride at a temperature of 400-600 °C:

CmOCl + 2HCl → CmCl_{3} + H_{2}O

It can also be obtained from the dissolution of metallic curium in dilute hydrochloric acid:

2Cm + 6HCl → 2CmCl_{3} + 3H_{2} in H_{2}O

This latter method is complicated by the ongoing processes of hydrolysis and hydration of the resulting compound in an aqueous solution, making it problematic to obtain a pure product.

It can be obtained from the reaction of curium nitride with cadmium chloride:

2 CmN + 3 CdCl_{2} → 2 CmCl_{3} + Cd_{3}N_{2}
