= Curium(III) fluoride =

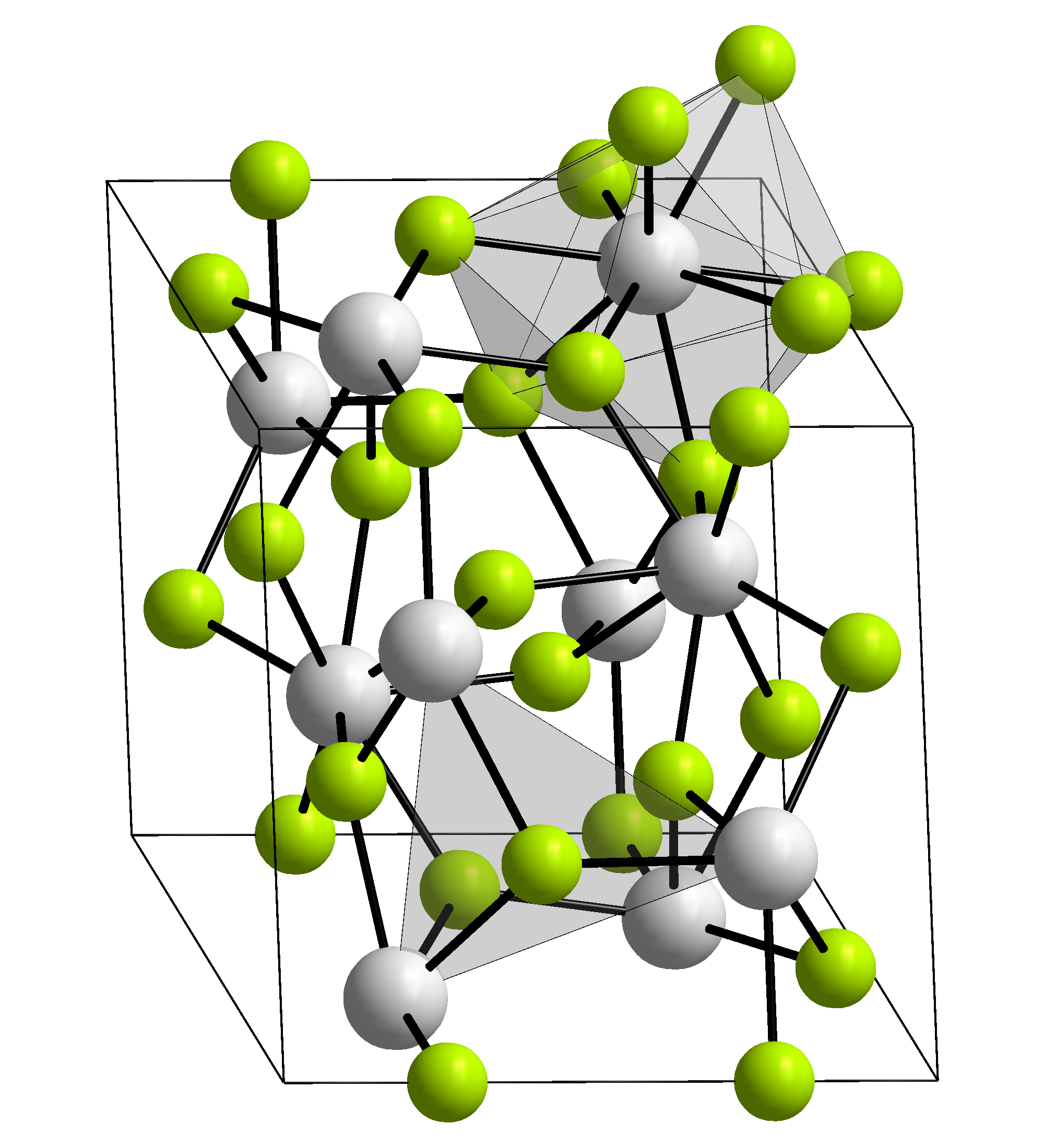
- Crystal structure

Names
- IUPAC name Curium(III) fluoride
- Other names Curium trifluoride

Identifiers
CAS Number	13708-79-7
3D model (JSmol)	Interactive image
ChemSpider	57569004
PubChem CID	101943145
- InChI: InChI=1S/Cm.3FH/h;3*1H/q+3;;;/p-3
- SMILES: F[Cm](F)F

Properties
Chemical formula	CmF_{3}
Appearance	Colorless solid
Melting point	1406 ± 20 °C;
Solubility in water	~10 mg/L

Structure
Crystal structure	Rhombohedral, hR24
Space group	P3̅c1, No. 165
Lattice constant	a = 0.7012 nm, c = 0.7198 nm
Lattice volume (V)	0.30650
Formula units (Z)	6

Thermochemistry
Std molar entropy (S^{⦵}_{298})	121 J/mol·K
Std enthalpy of formation (Δ_{f}H^{⦵}_{298})	−1660 kJ/mol
- Except where otherwise noted, data are given for materials in their standard state (at 25 °C [77 °F], 100 kPa). Infobox references

Curium(III) fluoride or curium trifluoride is the chemical compound composed of curium and fluorine with the formula CmF_{3}. It is a white, nearly insoluble salt that has the same crystal structure as LaF_{3}. It precipitates as a hydrate when fluoride ions are added to a weakly acidic Cm(III) solution; alternatively it can be synthesized by reacting hydrofluoric acid with Cm(OH)_{3}. The anhydrous form is then obtained by desiccation or by treatment with hydrogen fluoride gas.

== Preparation ==
Curium fluoride can be prepared by in the reaction of curium with fluorine ions in an aqueous solution under weakly acidic conditions:

Cm^{3+} (aq) + 3 F^{−} (aq) → CmF_{3} (s) ↓

Another possible preparation is the reaction of curium hydroxide with hydrofluoric acid, which also produces a hydrate of curium fluoride.
