= Curium =

Curium, _{96}Cm
- A piece of curium metal in a quartz tube

Curium
- Pronunciation: /ˈkjʊəriəm/ (KURE-ee-əm)
- Appearance: silvery metallic, glows purple in the dark
- Mass number: [247]

Curium in the periodic table
Hydrogen																															Helium
Lithium	Beryllium																									Boron	Carbon	Nitrogen	Oxygen	Fluorine	Neon
Sodium	Magnesium																									Aluminium	Silicon	Phosphorus	Sulfur	Chlorine	Argon
Potassium	Calcium															Scandium	Titanium	Vanadium	Chromium	Manganese	Iron	Cobalt	Nickel	Copper	Zinc	Gallium	Germanium	Arsenic	Selenium	Bromine	Krypton
Rubidium	Strontium															Yttrium	Zirconium	Niobium	Molybdenum	Technetium	Ruthenium	Rhodium	Palladium	Silver	Cadmium	Indium	Tin	Antimony	Tellurium	Iodine	Xenon
Caesium	Barium	Lanthanum	Cerium	Praseodymium	Neodymium	Promethium	Samarium	Europium	Gadolinium	Terbium	Dysprosium	Holmium	Erbium	Thulium	Ytterbium	Lutetium	Hafnium	Tantalum	Tungsten	Rhenium	Osmium	Iridium	Platinum	Gold	Mercury (element)	Thallium	Lead	Bismuth	Polonium	Astatine	Radon
Francium	Radium	Actinium	Thorium	Protactinium	Uranium	Neptunium	Plutonium	Americium	Curium	Berkelium	Californium	Einsteinium	Fermium	Mendelevium	Nobelium	Lawrencium	Rutherfordium	Dubnium	Seaborgium	Bohrium	Hassium	Meitnerium	Darmstadtium	Roentgenium	Copernicium	Nihonium	Flerovium	Moscovium	Livermorium	Tennessine	Oganesson
Gd
↑
Cm
↓
(Ubo)
americium ← curium → berkelium
- Atomic number (Z): 96
- Group: f-block groups (no number)
- Period: period 7
- Block: f-block
- Electron configuration: [Rn] 5f^{7} 6d^{1} 7s^{2}
- Electrons per shell: 2, 8, 18, 32, 25, 9, 2

Physical properties
- Phase at STP: solid
- Melting point: 1613 K (1340 °C, 2444 °F)
- Boiling point: 3383 K (3110 °C, 5630 °F)
- Density (near r.t.): 13.51 g/cm^{3}
- Heat of fusion: 13.85 kJ/mol
Vapor pressure
P (Pa)	1	10	100	1 k	10 k	100 k
at T (K)	1788	1982				

Atomic properties
- Oxidation states: common: +3 +2, +4, +5, +6
- Electronegativity: Pauling scale: 1.3
- Ionization energies: 1st: 581 kJ/mol
- Atomic radius: empirical: 174 pm
- Covalent radius: 169±3 pm
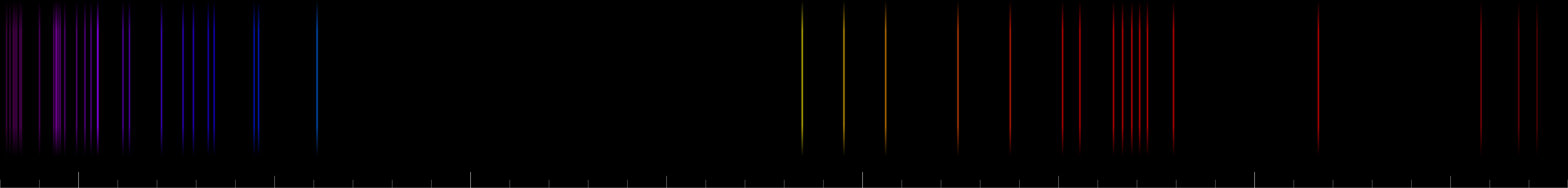
- Spectral lines of curium

Other properties
- Natural occurrence: synthetic
- Crystal structure: double hexagonal close-packed (dhcp)
- Electrical resistivity: 1.25 µΩ⋅m
- Magnetic ordering: antiferromagnetic-paramagnetic transition at 52 K
- CAS Number: 7440-51-9

History
- Naming: named after Marie Skłodowska-Curie and Pierre Curie
- Discovery: Glenn T. Seaborg, Ralph A. James, Albert Ghiorso (1944)

Isotopes of curium
Main isotopes			Decay	
Isotope	abundance	half-life (t_{1/2})	mode	product
^{242}Cm	synth	162.8 d	α	^{238}Pu
^{242}Cm	synth	162.8 d	SF	–
^{242}Cm	synth	162.8 d	CD	^{208}Pb
^{243}Cm	synth	29.1 y	α	^{239}Pu
^{243}Cm	synth	29.1 y	ε	^{243}Am
^{243}Cm	synth	29.1 y	SF	–
^{244}Cm	synth	18.11 y	α	^{240}Pu
^{244}Cm	synth	18.11 y	SF	–
^{245}Cm	synth	8250 y	α	^{241}Pu
^{245}Cm	synth	8250 y	SF	–
^{246}Cm	synth	4706 y	α	^{242}Pu
^{246}Cm	synth	4706 y	SF	–
^{247}Cm	synth	1.56×10^{7} y	α	^{243}Pu
^{248}Cm	synth	3.48×10^{5} y	α	^{244}Pu
^{248}Cm	synth	3.48×10^{5} y	SF	–
^{250}Cm	synth	8300 y	SF	–
^{250}Cm	synth	8300 y	α	^{246}Pu
^{250}Cm	synth	8300 y	β^{−}	^{250}Bk

Curium is a synthetic chemical element; it has symbol Cm and atomic number 96. This transuranic actinide element was named after eminent scientists Marie and Pierre Curie, both known for their research on radioactivity. Curium was first intentionally made by the team of Glenn T. Seaborg, Ralph A. James, and Albert Ghiorso in 1944, using the cyclotron at Berkeley. They bombarded the newly discovered element plutonium (the isotope ^{239}Pu) with alpha particles. This was then sent to the Metallurgical Laboratory at the University of Chicago where a tiny sample of curium was eventually separated and identified. The discovery was kept secret until after the end of World War II. The news was released to the public in November 1947. Most curium is produced by bombarding uranium or plutonium with neutrons in nuclear reactors – one tonne of spent nuclear fuel contains ~20 grams of curium.

Curium is a hard, dense, silvery metal with a relatively high melting point and boiling point among the actinides. It is paramagnetic at ambient conditions, but becomes antiferromagnetic upon cooling, and other magnetic transitions are also seen in many curium compounds. In compounds, curium usually has valence +3 and sometimes +4; the +3 valence is predominant in solutions. Curium readily oxidizes, and its oxides are a dominant form of this element. It forms strongly fluorescent complexes with various organic compounds. If it gets into the human body, curium accumulates in bones, lungs, and liver, where it promotes cancer.

All known isotopes of curium are radioactive and have small critical mass for a nuclear chain reaction. The most stable isotope, ^{247}Cm, has a half-life of 15.6 million years; the longest-lived curium isotopes predominantly emit alpha particles. Radioisotope thermoelectric generators can use the heat from this process, but this is hindered by the rarity and high cost of curium. Curium is used in making heavier actinides and the ^{238}Pu radionuclide for power sources in artificial cardiac pacemakers and RTGs for spacecraft. It served as the α-source in the alpha particle X-ray spectrometers of several space probes, including the Sojourner, Spirit, Opportunity, and Curiosity Mars rovers and the Philae lander on comet 67P/Churyumov–Gerasimenko, to analyze the composition and structure of the surface.

== History ==
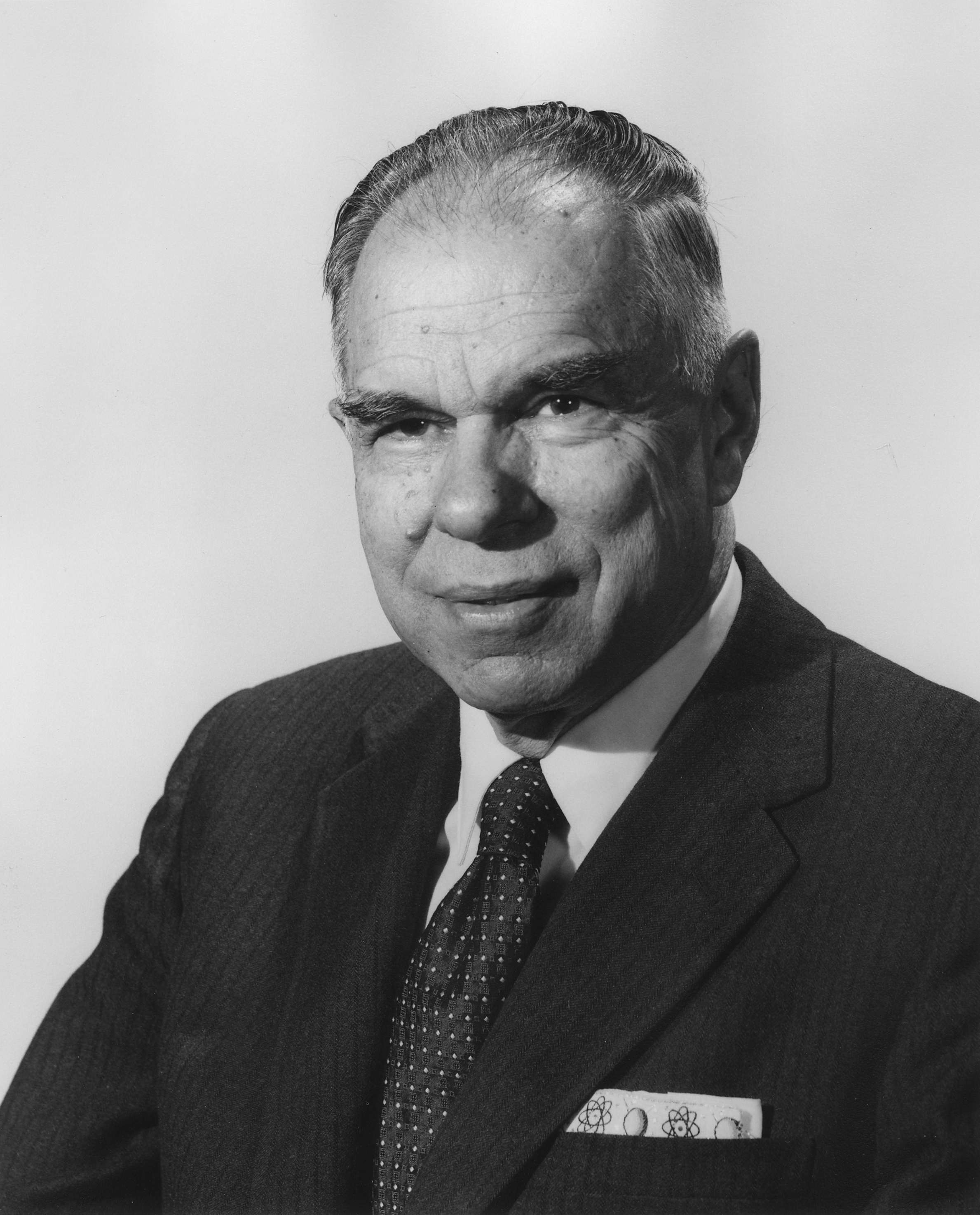
Glenn T. Seaborg

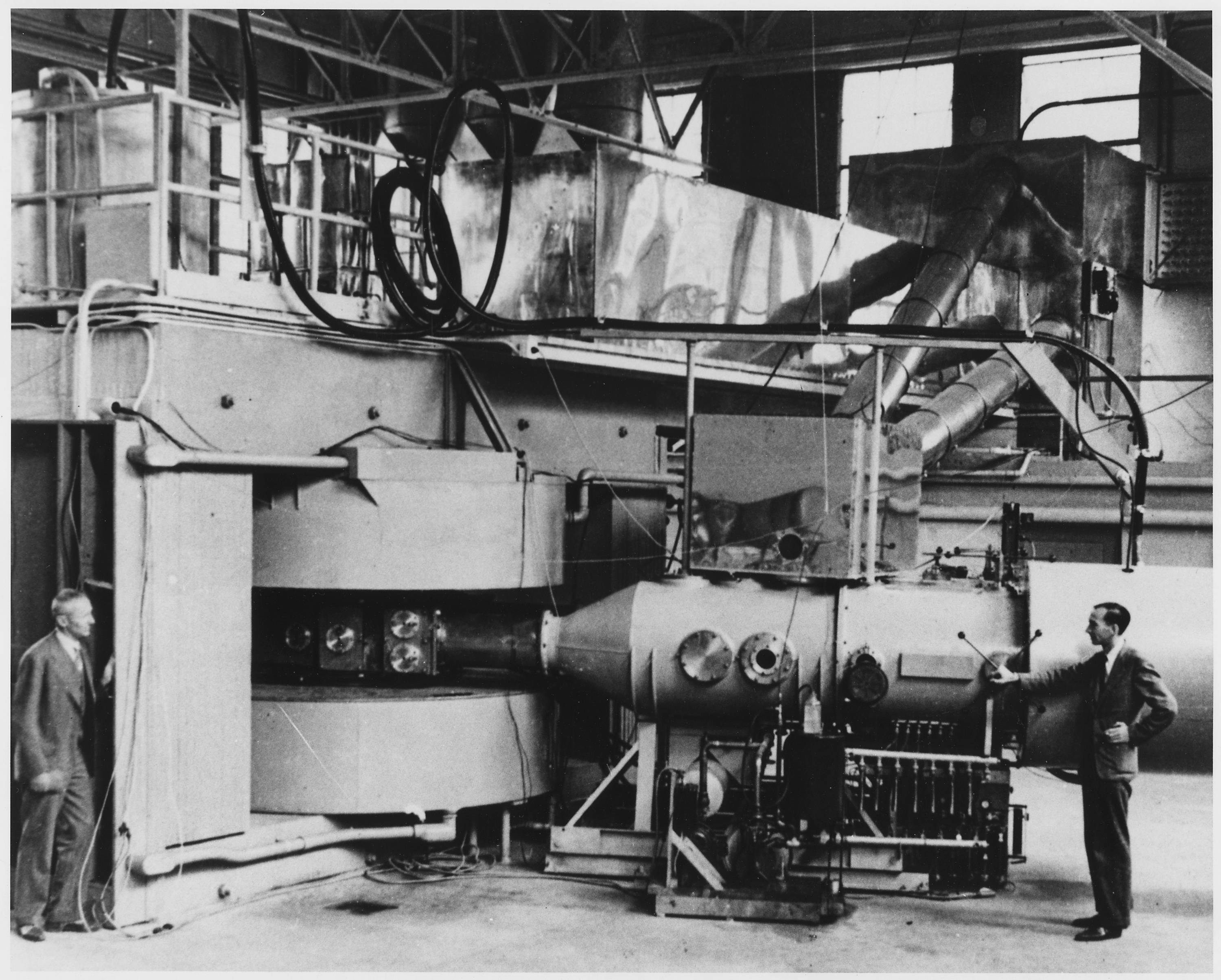
The 60-inch (150 cm) cyclotron at the Lawrence Radiation Laboratory, University of California, Berkeley, in August 1939.

Curium was first intentionally synthesized, isolated and identified in 1944, at University of California, Berkeley, by Glenn T. Seaborg, Ralph A. James, and Albert Ghiorso. In their experiments, they used a 60-inch (150 cm) cyclotron.

Curium was chemically identified at the Metallurgical Laboratory (now Argonne National Laboratory), University of Chicago. It was the third transuranium element to be discovered even though it is the fourth in the series – the lighter element americium was still unknown.

The sample was prepared as follows: first plutonium nitrate solution was coated on a platinum foil of ~0.5 cm^{2} area, the solution was evaporated and the residue was converted into plutonium(IV) oxide (PuO_{2}) by annealing. Following cyclotron irradiation of the oxide, the coating was dissolved with nitric acid and then precipitated as the hydroxide using concentrated aqueous ammonia solution. The residue was dissolved in perchloric acid, and further separation was done by ion exchange to yield a certain isotope of curium. The separation of curium and americium was so painstaking that the Berkeley group initially called those elements pandemonium (from Greek for all demons or hell) and delirium (from Latin for madness).

^{242}Cm was made in July–August 1944 by bombarding ^{239}Pu with α-particles to produce curium with the release of a neutron:

$$\ce{^{239}_{94}Pu + ^{4}_{2}He -> ^{242}_{96}Cm + ^{1}_{0}n}$$

^{242}Cm was unambiguously identified by the characteristic energy of the α-particles emitted during the decay:

$$\ce{^{242}_{96}Cm -> ^{238}_{94}Pu + ^{4}_{2}He}$$

The half-life of this alpha decay was first measured as 5 months (150 days) and then corrected to 162.8 days.

Another isotope ^{240}Cm was produced in a similar reaction in March 1945:

$$\ce{^{239}_{94}Pu + ^{4}_{2}He -> ^{240}_{96}Cm + 3^{1}_{0}n}$$

The α-decay half-life of ^{240}Cm was determined as 26.8 days and later revised to 30.4 days.

The discovery of curium and americium in 1944 was closely related to the Manhattan Project, so the results were confidential and declassified only in 1945. Seaborg leaked the synthesis of the elements 95 and 96 on the U.S. radio show for children, the Quiz Kids, five days before the official presentation at an American Chemical Society meeting on November 11, 1945, when one listener asked if any new transuranic element beside plutonium and neptunium had been discovered during the war. The discovery of curium (^{242}Cm and ^{240}Cm), its production, and its compounds was later patented listing only Seaborg as the inventor.

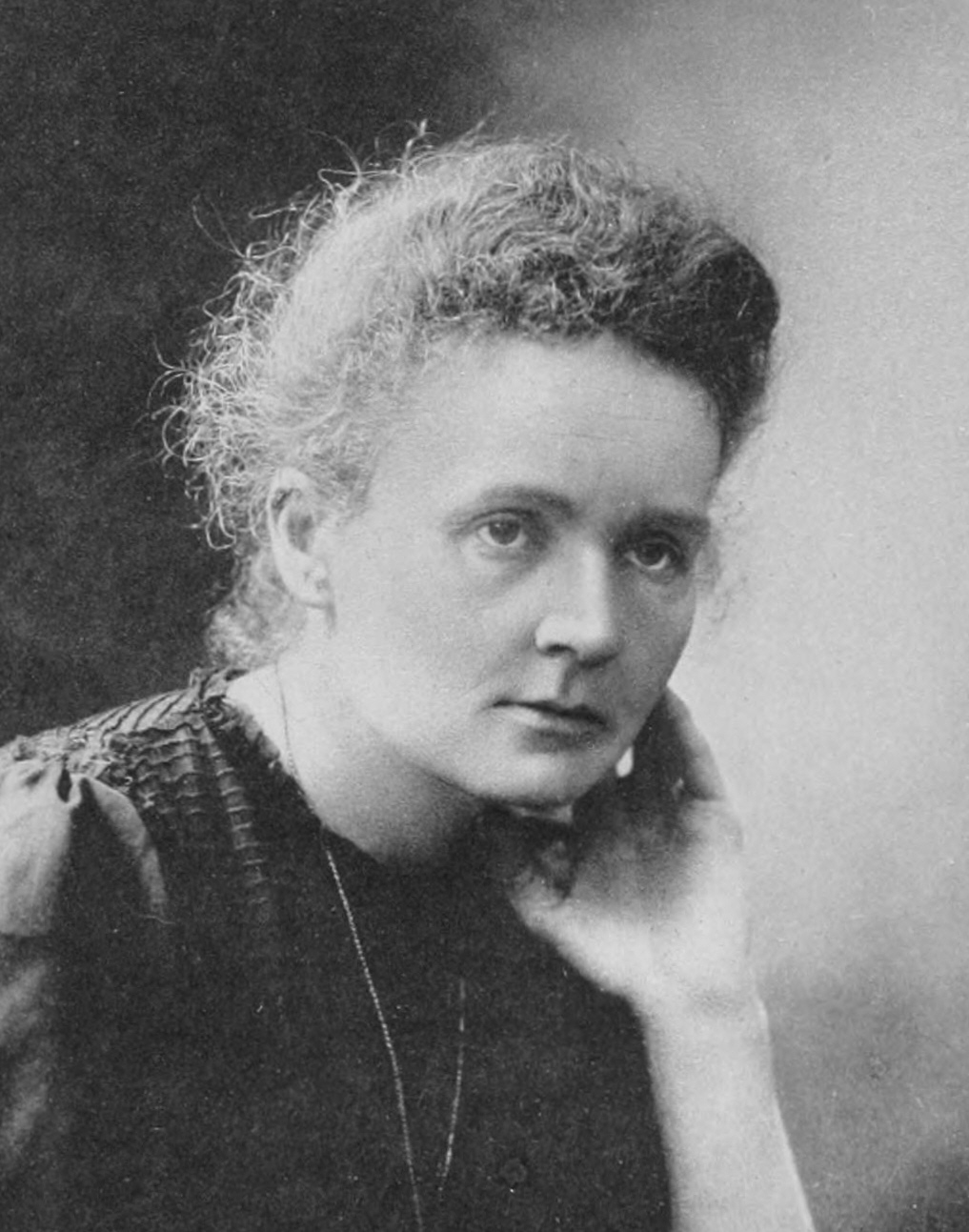
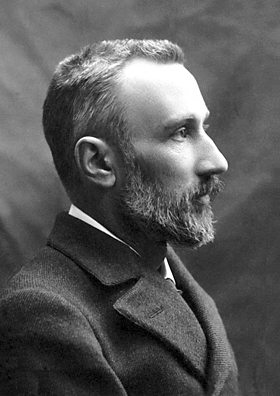
Marie and Pierre Curie

The element was named after Marie Curie and her husband Pierre Curie, who are known for discovering radium and for their work in radioactivity. It followed the example of gadolinium, a lanthanide element above curium in the periodic table, which was named after the explorer of rare-earth elements Johan Gadolin.

The first curium samples were barely visible, and were identified by their radioactivity. Louis Werner and Isadore Perlman made the first substantial sample of 30 μg curium-242 hydroxide at University of California, Berkeley in 1947 by bombarding americium-241 with neutrons. Macroscopic amounts of curium(III) fluoride were obtained in 1950 by W. W. T. Crane, J. C. Wallmann and B. B. Cunningham. Its magnetic susceptibility was very close to that of GdF_{3} providing the first experimental evidence for the +3 valence of curium in its compounds. Curium metal was produced only in 1950 by reduction of CmF_{3} with barium.

== Characteristics ==
=== Physical ===
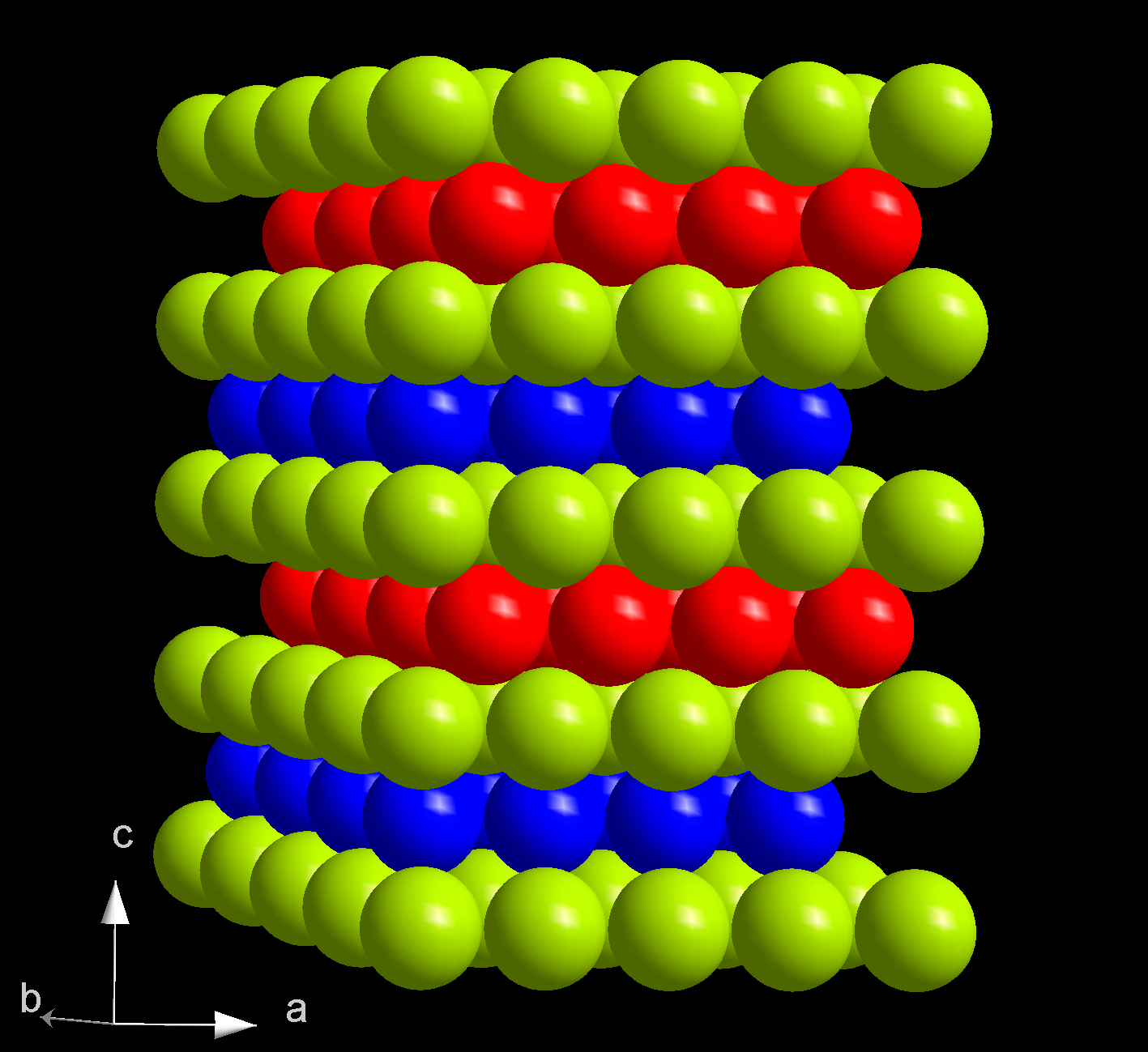
Double-hexagonal close packing with the layer sequence ABAC in the crystal structure of α-curium (A: green, B: blue, C: red)

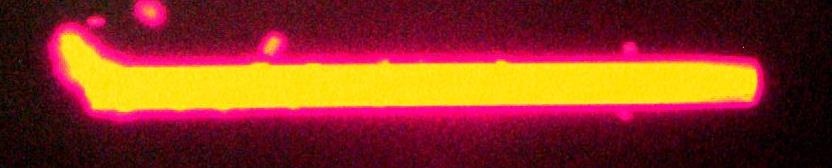
Photoluminescence of the Cm(HDPA)_{3}·H_{2}O crystal upon irradiation with 420 nm light

A synthetic, radioactive element, curium is a hard, dense metal with a silvery-white appearance and physical and chemical properties resembling gadolinium. Its melting point of 1344 °C is significantly higher than that of the previous elements neptunium (637 °C), plutonium (639 °C) and americium (1176 °C). In comparison, gadolinium melts at 1312 °C. Curium boils at 3556 °C. With a density of 13.52 g/cm^{3}, curium is lighter than neptunium (20.45 g/cm^{3}) and plutonium (19.8 g/cm^{3}), but heavier than most other metals. Of two crystalline forms of curium, α-Cm is more stable at ambient conditions. It has a hexagonal symmetry, space group P6_{3}/mmc, lattice parameters a = 365 pm and c = 1182 pm, and four formula units per unit cell. The crystal consists of double-hexagonal close packing with the layer sequence ABAC and so is isotypic with α-lanthanum. At pressure >23 GPa, at room temperature, α-Cm becomes β-Cm, which has face-centered cubic symmetry, space group Fm3̅m and lattice constant a = 493 pm. On further compression to 43 GPa, curium becomes an orthorhombic γ-Cm structure similar to α-uranium, with no further transitions observed up to 52 GPa. These three curium phases are also called Cm I, II and III.

Curium has peculiar magnetic properties. Its neighbor element americium shows no deviation from Curie-Weiss paramagnetism in the entire temperature range, but α-Cm transforms to an antiferromagnetic state upon cooling to 65–52 K, and β-Cm exhibits a ferrimagnetic transition at ~205 K. Curium pnictides show ferromagnetic transitions upon cooling: ^{244}CmN and ^{244}CmAs at 109 K, ^{248}CmP at 73 K and ^{248}CmSb at 162 K. The lanthanide analog of curium, gadolinium, and its pnictides, also show magnetic transitions upon cooling, but the transition character is somewhat different: Gd and GdN become ferromagnetic, and GdP, GdAs and GdSb show antiferromagnetic ordering.

In accordance with magnetic data, electrical resistivity of curium increases with temperature – about twice between 4 and 60 K – and then is nearly constant up to room temperature. There is a significant increase in resistivity over time (~10 μΩ·cm/h) due to self-damage of the crystal lattice by alpha decay. This makes uncertain the true resistivity of curium (~125 μΩ·cm). Curium's resistivity is similar to that of gadolinium, and the actinides plutonium and neptunium, but significantly higher than that of americium, uranium, polonium and thorium.

Under ultraviolet illumination, curium(III) ions show strong and stable yellow-orange fluorescence with a maximum in the range of 590–640 nm depending on their environment. The fluorescence originates from the transitions from the first excited state ^{6}D_{7/2} and the ground state ^{8}S_{7/2}. Analysis of this fluorescence allows monitoring interactions between Cm(III) ions in organic and inorganic complexes.

=== Chemical ===
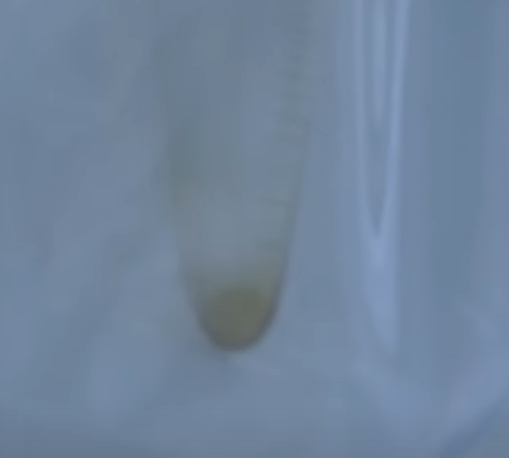
A solution of curium

Curium ion in solution almost always has a +3 oxidation state, the most stable oxidation state for curium. A +4 oxidation state is seen mainly in a few solid phases, such as CmO_{2} and CmF_{4}. Aqueous curium(IV) is only known in the presence of strong oxidizers such as potassium persulfate, and is easily reduced to curium(III) by radiolysis and even by water itself. The chemical behavior of curium is different from the actinides thorium and uranium, and is similar to americium and many lanthanides. In aqueous solution, the Cm^{3+} ion is colorless to pale green; Cm^{4+} ion is pale yellow. The optical absorption of Cm^{3+} ion contains three sharp peaks at 375.4, 381.2 and 396.5 nm and their strength can be directly converted into the concentration of the ions. The +6 oxidation state has only been reported once in solution in 1978, as the curyl ion (CmO^{2+}_{2}): this was prepared from beta decay of americium-242 in the americium(V) ion ^{242}AmO^{+}_{2}. Failure to get Cm(VI) from oxidation of Cm(III) and Cm(IV) may be due to the high Cm^{4+}/Cm^{3+} ionization potential and the instability of Cm(V).

Curium ions are hard Lewis acids and thus form most stable complexes with hard bases. The bonding is mostly ionic, with a small covalent component. Curium in its complexes commonly exhibits a 9-fold coordination environment, with a tricapped trigonal prismatic molecular geometry.

=== Isotopes ===
About 19 radioisotopes and 7 nuclear isomers, ^{233}Cm to ^{251}Cm, are known; none are stable. The longest half-lives are 15.6 million years (^{247}Cm) and 348,000 years (^{248}Cm). Other long-lived ones are ^{250}Cm (~8300 years), ^{245}Cm (8250 years), and ^{246}Cm (4706 years). Curium-250 is unusual: it mainly decays by spontaneous fission (only mode observed). The most common isotopes are ^{242}Cm and ^{244}Cm with the half-lives 162.8 days and 18.11 years, respectively.

Thermal neutron cross sections (barns)
	^{242}Cm	^{243}Cm	^{244}Cm	^{245}Cm	^{246}Cm	^{247}Cm
Fission	5	617	1.04	2145	0.14	81.90
Capture	16	130	15.20	369	1.22	57
C/F ratio	3.20	0.21	14.62	0.17	8.71	0.70
LEU spent nuclear fuel 20 years after 53 MWd/kg burnup
3 common isotopes		51	3700	390		
Fast-neutron reactor MOX fuel (avg 5 samples, burnup 66–120 GWd/t)
Total curium 3.09×10^{−3}%		27.64%	70.16%	2.166%	0.0376%	0.000928%

Isotope	^{242}Cm	^{243}Cm	^{244}Cm	^{245}Cm	^{246}Cm	^{247}Cm	^{248}Cm	^{250}Cm
Critical mass, kg	25	7.5	33	6.8	39	7	40.4	23.5

All isotopes ranging from ^{242}Cm to ^{248}Cm, as well as ^{250}Cm, undergo a self-sustaining nuclear chain reaction and thus in principle can be a nuclear fuel in a reactor. As in most transuranic elements, nuclear fission cross section is especially high for the odd-mass curium isotopes ^{243}Cm, ^{245}Cm and ^{247}Cm. These can be used in thermal-neutron reactors, whereas a mixture of curium isotopes is only suitable for fast breeder reactors since the even-mass isotopes are not fissile in a thermal reactor and accumulate as burn-up increases. The mixed-oxide (MOX) fuel, which is to be used in power reactors, should contain little or no curium because neutron activation of ^{248}Cm will create californium. Californium is a strong neutron emitter, and would pollute the back end of the fuel cycle and increase the dose to reactor personnel. Hence, if minor actinides are to be used as fuel in a thermal neutron reactor, the curium should be excluded from the fuel or placed in special fuel rods where it is the only actinide present.

Transmutation flow between ^{238}Pu and ^{244}Cm in LWR. Fission percentage is 100 minus shown percentages. Total rate of transmutation varies greatly by nuclide.^{245}Cm–^{248}Cm are long-lived with negligible decay.

The adjacent table lists the critical masses for curium isotopes for a sphere, without moderator or reflector. With a metal reflector (30 cm of steel), the critical masses of the odd isotopes are about 3–4 kg. When using water (thickness ~20–30 cm) as the reflector, the critical mass can be as small as 59 grams for ^{245}Cm, 155 grams for ^{243}Cm and 1550 grams for ^{247}Cm. There is significant uncertainty in these critical mass values. While it is usually on the order of 20%, the values for ^{242}Cm and ^{246}Cm were listed as large as 371 kg and 70.1 kg, respectively, by some research groups.

Curium is not currently used as nuclear fuel due to its low availability and high price. ^{245}Cm and ^{247}Cm have very small critical mass and so could be used in tactical nuclear weapons, but none are known to have been made. Curium-243 is not suitable for such, due to its short half-life and strong α emission, which would cause excessive heat. Curium-247 would be highly suitable due to its long half-life, which is 647 times longer than plutonium-239 (used in many existing nuclear weapons).

=== Occurrence ===
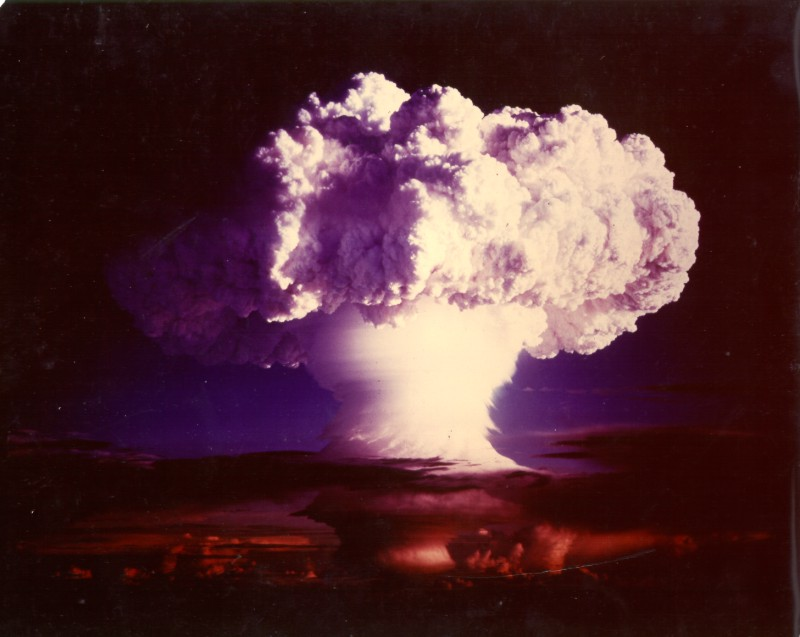
Several isotopes of curium were detected in the fallout from the Ivy Mike nuclear test.

The longest-lived isotope, ^{247}Cm, has half-life 15.6 million years; so any primordial curium, that is, present on Earth when it formed, would have decayed to undetectable levels by now. Its past presence as an extinct radionuclide is detectable as an excess of its primordial, long-lived daughter ^{235}U. Although ^{247}Cm may be produced via r-process nucleosynthesis in nearby supernovae or neutron star mergers, and transported through the interstellar medium to Earth in trace quantities, all searches for cosmogenic ^{247}Cm have so far been unsuccessful.

Traces of ^{242}Cm may occur naturally in uranium minerals due to neutron capture and beta decay (^{238}U → ^{239}Pu → ^{240}Pu → ^{241}Am → ^{242}Cm), though the quantities would be tiny and this has not been confirmed: even with "extremely generous" estimates for neutron absorption possibilities, the quantity of ^{242}Cm present in 1 × 10^{8} kg of 18% uranium pitchblende would not even be one atom. There is also the possibility of ^{244}Cm being produced as the double beta decay daughter of natural ^{244}Pu; though this process is energetically possible, it has not been observed, and is estimated to occur less than once per 100 million alpha decays of ^{244}Pu.

Curium is made artificially in small amounts for research purposes. It also occurs as one of the waste products in spent nuclear fuel. Curium is present in nature in some areas used for nuclear weapons testing. Analysis of the debris at the test site of the United States' first thermonuclear weapon, Ivy Mike (1 November 1952, Enewetak Atoll), besides einsteinium, fermium, plutonium and americium also revealed isotopes of berkelium, californium and curium, in particular ^{245}Cm, ^{246}Cm and smaller quantities of ^{247}Cm, ^{248}Cm and ^{249}Cm.

Atmospheric curium compounds are poorly soluble in common solvents and mostly adhere to soil particles. Soil analysis revealed about 4,000 times higher concentration of curium at the sandy soil particles than in water present in the soil pores. An even higher ratio of about 18,000 was measured in loam soils.

The transuranic elements up to fermium, including curium, should have been present in the natural nuclear fission reactor at Oklo, but any quantities produced then would have long since decayed away.

== Synthesis ==
=== Isotope preparation ===
Curium is made in small amounts in nuclear reactors, and by now only kilograms of ^{242}Cm and ^{244}Cm have been accumulated, and grams or even milligrams for heavier isotopes. Hence the high price of curium, which has been quoted at 160–185 USD per milligram, with a more recent estimate at US$2,000/g for ^{242}Cm and US$170/g for ^{244}Cm. In nuclear reactors, curium is formed from ^{238}U in a series of nuclear reactions. In the first chain, ^{238}U captures a neutron and converts into ^{239}U, which via β^{−} decay transforms into ^{239}Np and ^{239}Pu.

$\ce{^{238}_{92}U->[\ce{(n,\gamma)}] {^{239}_{92}U} ->[\beta^-][23.5\ \ce{min}] ^{239}_{93}Np ->[\beta^-][2.3565\ \ce{d}] ^{239}_{94}Pu}$ (the times are half-lives).	1

Further neutron capture followed by β^{−}-decay gives americium (^{241}Am) which further becomes ^{242}Cm:

$\ce{^{239}_{94}Pu->[\ce{2(n,\gamma)}] ^{241}_{94}Pu ->[\beta^-][14.35\ \ce{yr}] {^{241}_{95}Am} ->[\ce{(n,\gamma)}] ^{242}_{95}Am ->[\beta^-][16.02 \ce{h}] ^{242}_{96}Cm}$.	2

For research purposes, curium is obtained by irradiating not uranium but plutonium, which is available in large amounts from spent nuclear fuel. A much higher neutron flux is used for the irradiation that results in a different reaction chain and formation of ^{244}Cm:

$\ce{^{239}_{94}Pu ->[\ce{4(n,\gamma)}] ^{243}_{94}Pu ->[\beta^-][4.956\ \ce{h}] ^{243}_{95}Am ->[(\ce n,\gamma)] ^{244}_{95}Am ->[\beta^-][10.1 \ce{h}] ^{244}_{96}Cm ->[\alpha][18.11\ \ce{yr}] ^{240}_{94}Pu}$	3

Curium-244 alpha decays to ^{240}Pu, but it also absorbs neutrons, hence a small amount of heavier curium isotopes. Of those, ^{247}Cm and ^{248}Cm are popular in scientific research due to their long half-lives. But the production rate of ^{247}Cm in thermal neutron reactors is low because it is prone to fission due to thermal neutrons. Synthesis of ^{250}Cm by neutron capture is unlikely due to the short half-life of the intermediate ^{249}Cm (64 min), which β^{−} decays to the berkelium isotope ^{249}Bk.

$\ce{^\mathit{A}_{96}Cm{} + ^{1}_{0}n -> ^{\mathit{A}+1}_{96}Cm{} + \gamma} \ (\text{for } 244 \le A \le 248)$	4

The above cascade of (n,γ) reactions gives a mix of different curium isotopes. Their post-synthesis separation is cumbersome, so a selective synthesis is desired. Curium-248 is favored for research purposes due to its long half-life. The most efficient way to prepare this isotope is by α-decay of the californium isotope ^{252}Cf, which is available in relatively large amounts due to its long half-life (2.65 years). About 35–50 mg of ^{248}Cm is produced thus, per year. The associated reaction produces ^{248}Cm with isotopic purity of 97%.

$$\begin{matrix}{}\\ \ce{^{252}_{98}Cf ->[\alpha][2.645\ \ce{yr}] ^{248}_{96}Cm}\\{} \end{matrix}$$	5

Another isotope, ^{245}Cm, can be obtained for research, from α-decay of ^{249}Cf; the latter isotope is produced in small amounts from β^{−}-decay of ^{249}Bk.

$\ce{^{249}_{97}Bk ->[\beta^-][330\ \ce{d}] ^{249}_{98}Cf ->[\alpha][351\ \ce{yr}] ^{245}_{96}Cm}$	6

=== Metal preparation ===
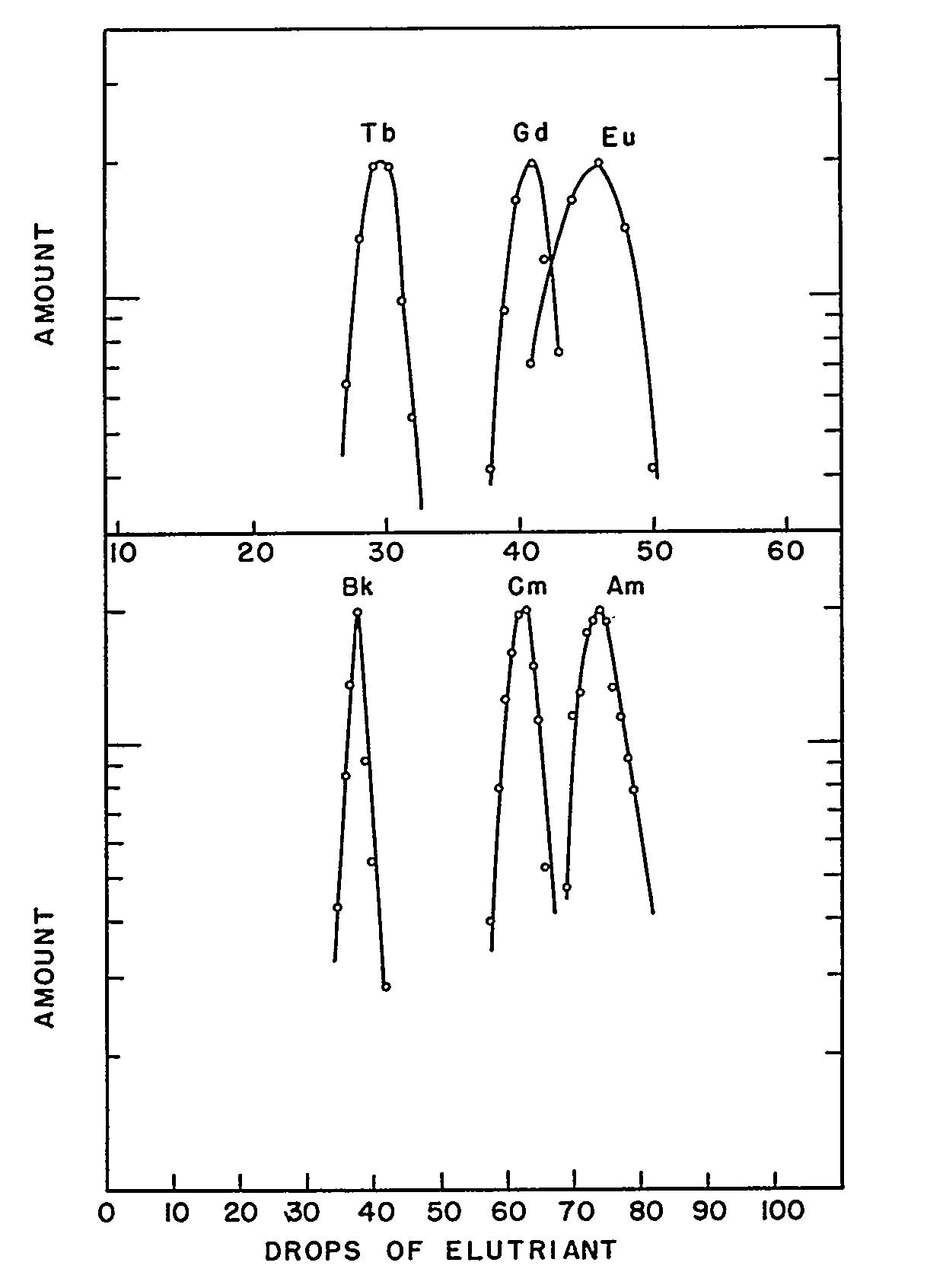
Chromatographic elution curves revealing the similarity between Tb, Gd, Eu lanthanides and corresponding Bk, Cm, Am actinides

Most synthesis routines yield a mix of actinide isotopes as oxides, from which a given isotope of curium needs to be separated. An example procedure could be to dissolve spent reactor fuel (e.g. MOX fuel) in nitric acid, and remove the bulk of the uranium and plutonium using a PUREX (Plutonium – URanium EXtraction) type extraction with tributyl phosphate in a hydrocarbon. The lanthanides and the remaining actinides are then separated from the aqueous residue (raffinate) by a diamide-based extraction to give, after stripping, a mixture of trivalent actinides and lanthanides. A curium compound is then selectively extracted using multi-step chromatographic and centrifugation techniques with an appropriate reagent. Bis-triazinyl bipyridine complex has been recently proposed as such reagent which is highly selective to curium. Separation of curium from the very chemically similar americium can also be done by treating a slurry of their hydroxides in aqueous sodium bicarbonate with ozone at elevated temperature. Both americium and curium are present in solutions mostly in the +3 valence state; americium oxidizes to soluble Am(IV) complexes, but curium stays unchanged and so can be isolated by repeated centrifugation.

Metallic curium is obtained by reduction of its compounds. Initially, curium(III) fluoride was used for this purpose. The reaction was done in an environment free of water and oxygen, in an apparatus made of tantalum and tungsten, using elemental barium or lithium as reducing agents.

$$\mathrm{CmF_3\ +\ 3\ Li\ \longrightarrow \ Cm\ +\ 3\ LiF}$$

Another possibility is reduction of curium(IV) oxide using a magnesium-zinc alloy in a melt of magnesium chloride and magnesium fluoride.

== Compounds and reactions ==
=== Oxides ===
Curium readily reacts with oxygen forming mostly Cm_{2}O_{3} and CmO_{2} oxides, but the divalent oxide CmO is also known. Black CmO_{2} can be obtained by burning curium oxalate (Cm_{2}(C_{2}O_{4})_{3}), nitrate (Cm(NO_{3})_{3}), or hydroxide in pure oxygen. Upon heating to 600–650 °C in vacuum (about 0.01 Pa), it transforms into the whitish Cm_{2}O_{3}:

4CmO_{2} → 2Cm_{2}O_{3} + O_{2}.

Or, Cm_{2}O_{3} can be obtained by reducing CmO_{2} with molecular hydrogen:

2CmO_{2} + H_{2} → Cm_{2}O_{3} + H_{2}O

Also, a number of ternary oxides of the type M(II)CmO_{3} are known, where M stands for a divalent metal, such as barium.

Thermal oxidation of trace quantities of curium hydride (CmH_{2–3}) has been reported to give a volatile form of CmO_{2} and the volatile trioxide CmO_{3}, one of two known examples of the very rare +6 state for curium. Another observed species was reported to behave similar to a supposed plutonium tetroxide and was tentatively characterized as CmO_{4}, with curium in the extremely rare +8 state; but new experiments seem to indicate that CmO_{4} does not exist, and have cast doubt on the existence of PuO_{4} as well.

=== Halides ===
The colorless curium(III) fluoride (CmF_{3}) can be made by adding fluoride ions into curium(III)-containing solutions. The brown tetravalent curium(IV) fluoride (CmF_{4}) on the other hand is only obtained by reacting curium(III) fluoride with molecular fluorine:

2 CmF_{3} + F_{2} → 2 CmF_{4}

A series of ternary fluorides are known of the form A_{7}Cm_{6}F_{31} (A = alkali metal).

The colorless curium(III) chloride (CmCl_{3}) is made by reacting curium hydroxide (Cm(OH)_{3}) with anhydrous hydrogen chloride gas. It can be further turned into other halides such as curium(III) bromide (colorless to light green) and curium(III) iodide (colorless), by reacting it with the ammonia salt of the corresponding halide at temperatures of ~400–450 °C:

CmCl_{3} + 3 NH_{4}I → CmI_{3} + 3 NH_{4}Cl

Or, one can heat curium oxide to ~600 °C with the corresponding acid (such as hydrobromic for curium bromide). Vapor phase hydrolysis of curium(III) chloride gives curium oxychloride:

CmCl_{3} + H_{2}O → CmOCl + 2 HCl

=== Chalcogenides and pnictides ===
Sulfides, selenides and tellurides of curium have been obtained by treating curium with gaseous sulfur, selenium or tellurium in vacuum at elevated temperature. Curium pnictides of the type CmX are known for nitrogen, phosphorus, arsenic and antimony. They can be prepared by reacting either curium(III) hydride (CmH_{3}) or metallic curium with these elements at elevated temperature.

=== Organocurium compounds and biological aspects ===
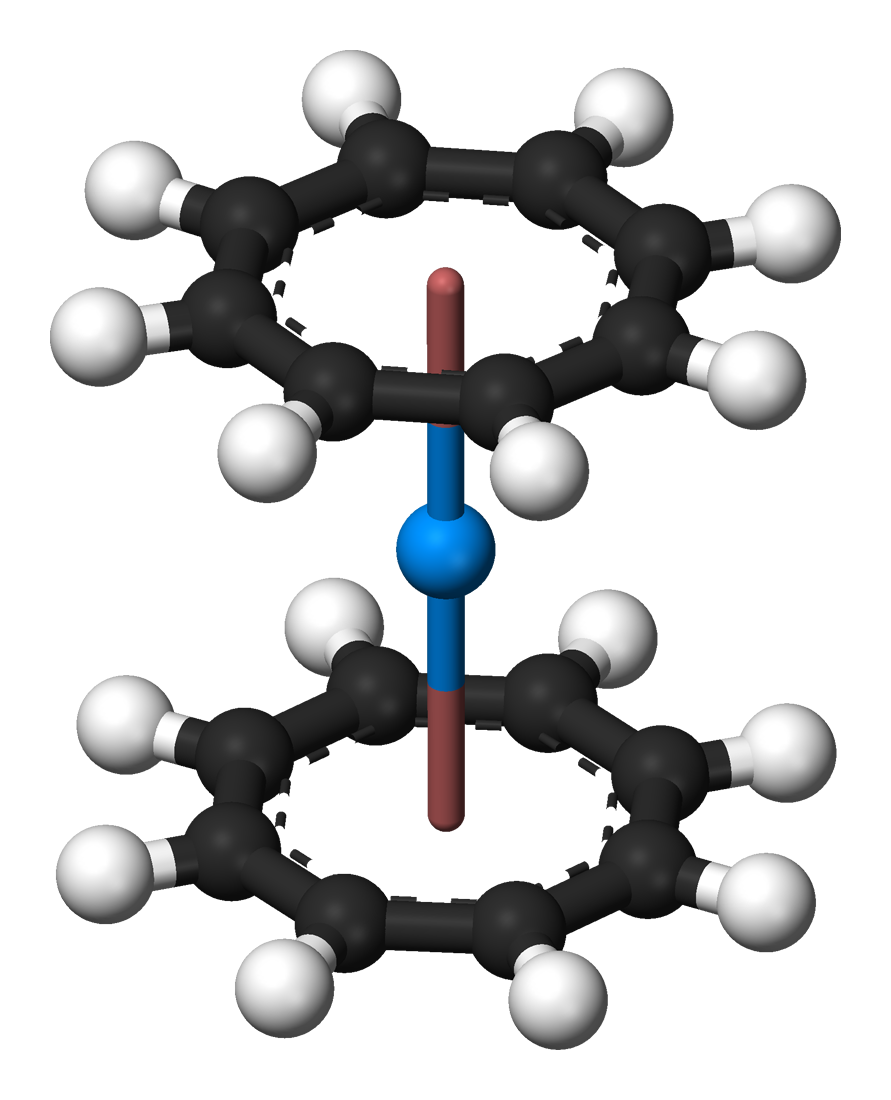
Predicted curocene structure

Organometallic complexes analogous to uranocene are known also for other actinides, such as thorium, protactinium, neptunium, plutonium and americium. Molecular orbital theory predicts a stable "curocene" complex (η^{8}-C_{8}H_{8})_{2}Cm, but it has not been reported experimentally yet.

Formation of the complexes of the type Cm(n-C_{3}H_{7}-BTP)_{3} (BTP = 2,6-di(1,2,4-triazin-3-yl)pyridine), in solutions containing n-C_{3}H_{7}-BTP and Cm^{3+} ions has been confirmed by EXAFS. Some of these BTP-type complexes selectively interact with curium and thus are useful for separating it from lanthanides and another actinides. Dissolved Cm^{3+} ions bind with many organic compounds, such as hydroxamic acid, urea, fluorescein and adenosine triphosphate. Many of these compounds are related to biological activity of various microorganisms. The resulting complexes show strong yellow-orange emission under UV light excitation, which is convenient not only for their detection, but also for studying interactions between the Cm^{3+} ion and the ligands via changes in the half-life (of the order ~0.1 ms) and spectrum of the fluorescence.

There are a few reports on biosorption of Cm^{3+} by bacteria and archaea, and in the laboratory both americium and curium were found to support the growth of methylotrophs.

== Applications ==
=== Radionuclides ===
Ionized air glow from curium alpha-radiation creates a purple aura in the dark.

Curium is one of the most radioactive isolable elements. Its two most common isotopes ^{242}Cm and ^{244}Cm are strong alpha emitters (energy 6 MeV); they have fairly short half-lives, 162.8 days and 18.1 years, and give as much as 120 W/g and 3 W/g of heat, respectively. Therefore, curium can be used in its common oxide form in radioisotope thermoelectric generators like those in spacecraft. This application has been studied for the ^{244}Cm isotope, while ^{242}Cm was abandoned due to its prohibitive price, around 2000 USD/g. ^{243}Cm with a ~30-year half-life and good energy yield of ~1.6 W/g could be a suitable fuel, but it gives significant amounts of harmful gamma and beta rays from radioactive decay products. As an α-emitter, ^{244}Cm needs much less radiation shielding, but it has a high spontaneous fission rate, and thus a lot of neutron and gamma radiation. Compared to a competing thermoelectric generator isotope such as ^{238}Pu, ^{244}Cm emits 500 times more neutrons, and its higher gamma emission requires a shield that is 20 times thicker—2 inches (51 mm) of lead for a 1 kW source, compared to 0.1 inches (2.5 mm) for ^{238}Pu. Therefore, this use of curium is currently considered impractical.

A more promising use of ^{242}Cm is for making ^{238}Pu, a better radioisotope for thermoelectric generators such as in heart pacemakers. The alternate routes to ^{238}Pu use the (n,γ) reaction of ^{237}Np, or deuteron bombardment of uranium, though both reactions always produce ^{236}Pu as an undesired by-product since the latter decays to ^{232}U with strong gamma emission. Curium is a common starting material for making higher transuranic and superheavy elements. Thus, bombarding ^{248}Cm with neon (^{22}Ne), magnesium (^{26}Mg), or calcium (^{48}Ca) yields isotopes of seaborgium (^{265}Sg), hassium (^{269}Hs and ^{270}Hs), and livermorium (^{292}Lv, ^{293}Lv, and possibly ^{294}Lv). Californium was discovered when a microgram-sized target of curium-242 was irradiated with 35 MeV alpha particles using the 60-inch (150 cm) cyclotron at Berkeley:

^{242}_{96}Cm + ^{4}_{2}He → ^{245}_{98}Cf + ^{1}_{0}n

Only about 5,000 atoms of californium were produced in this experiment.

The odd-mass curium isotopes ^{243}Cm, ^{245}Cm, and ^{247}Cm are all highly fissile and can release additional energy in a thermal spectrum nuclear reactor. All curium isotopes are fissionable in fast-neutron reactors. This is one of the motives for minor actinide separation and transmutation in the nuclear fuel cycle, helping to reduce the long-term radiotoxicity of used, or spent nuclear fuel.

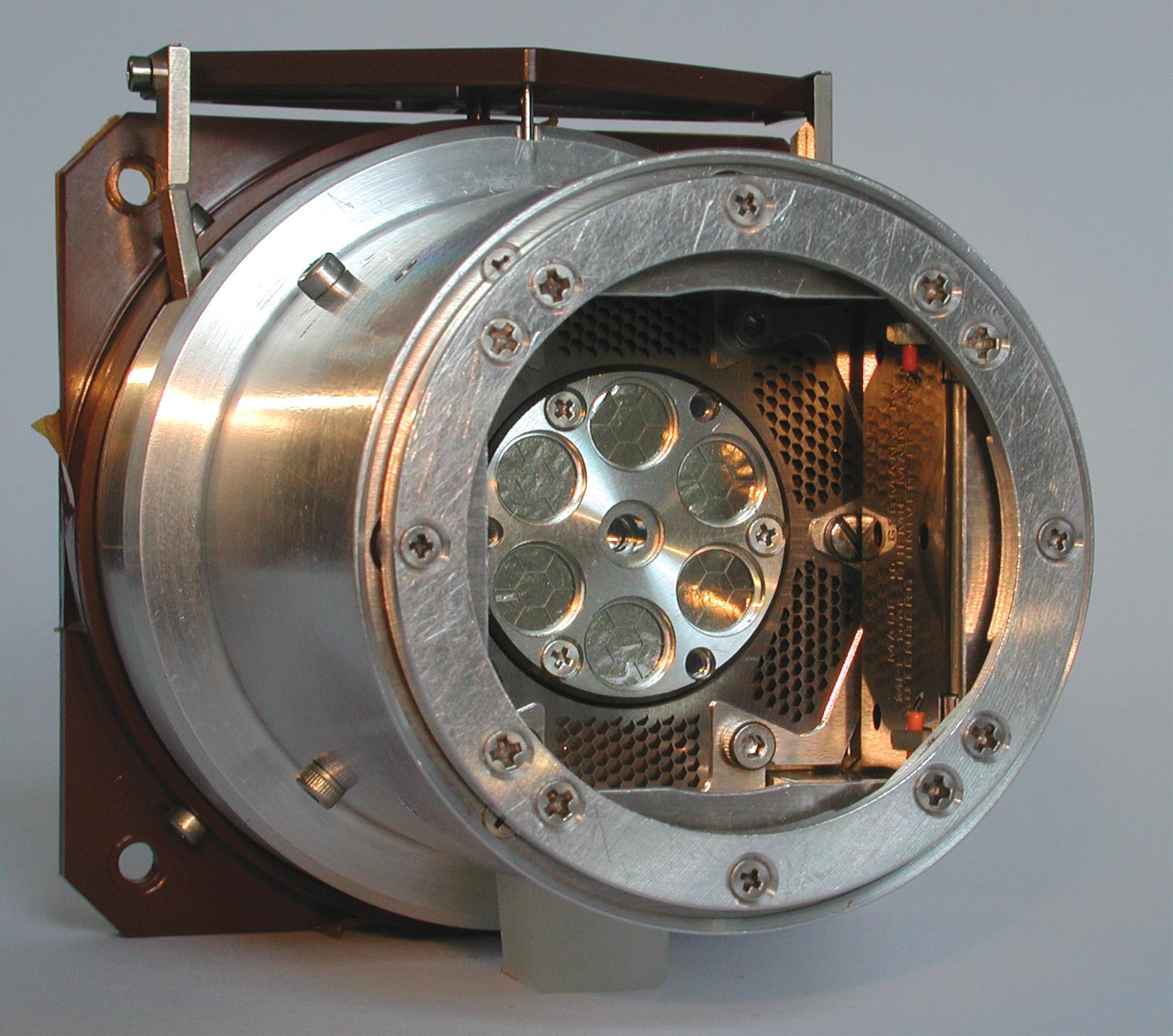
Alpha-particle X-ray spectrometer of a Mars exploration rover

=== X-ray spectrometer ===
The most practical application of ^{244}Cm—though rather limited in total volume—is as an α-particle source in alpha particle X-ray spectrometers (APXS). These instruments were installed on the Sojourner, Mars, Mars 96, Mars Exploration Rovers and Philae comet lander, as well as the Mars Science Laboratory to analyze the composition and structure of the rocks on the surface of planet Mars. APXS was also used in the Surveyor 5–7 moon probes but with a ^{242}Cm source.

An elaborate APXS setup has a sensor head containing six curium sources with a total decay rate of several tens of millicuries (roughly one gigabecquerel). The sources are collimated on a sample, and the energy spectra of the alpha particles and protons scattered from the sample are analyzed (proton analysis is done only in some spectrometers). These spectra contain quantitative information on all major elements in the sample except for hydrogen, helium and lithium.

== Safety ==
Due to its radioactivity, curium and its compounds must be handled in appropriate labs under special arrangements. While curium itself mostly emits α-particles which are absorbed by thin layers of common materials, some of its decay products emit significant fractions of beta and gamma rays, which require a more elaborate protection. If consumed, curium is excreted within a few days and only 0.05% is absorbed in the blood. From there, ~45% goes to the liver, 45% to the bones, and the remaining 10% is excreted. In bone, curium accumulates on the inside of the interfaces to the bone marrow and does not significantly redistribute with time; its radiation destroys bone marrow and thus stops red blood cell creation. The biological half-life of curium is about 20 years in the liver and 50 years in the bones. Curium is absorbed in the body much more strongly via inhalation, and the allowed total dose of ^{244}Cm in soluble form is 0.3 μCi. Intravenous injection of ^{242}Cm- and ^{244}Cm-containing solutions to rats increased the incidence of bone tumor, and inhalation promoted lung and liver cancer.

Curium isotopes are inevitably present in spent nuclear fuel (about 20 g/tonne). The isotopes ^{245}Cm–^{248}Cm have decay times of thousands of years and must be removed to neutralize the fuel for disposal. Such a procedure involves several steps, where curium is first separated and then converted by neutron bombardment in special reactors to short-lived nuclides. This procedure, nuclear transmutation, while well documented for other elements, is still being developed for curium.

== Bibliography ==
- Greenwood, Norman N.; Earnshaw, Alan (1997). Chemistry of the Elements (2nd ed.). Butterworth-Heinemann. doi:10.1016/C2009-0-30414-6. ISBN 978-0-08-037941-8.
- Holleman, Arnold F. and Wiberg, Nils Lehrbuch der Anorganischen Chemie, 102 Edition, de Gruyter, Berlin 2007, ISBN 978-3-11-017770-1.
- Penneman, R. A. and Keenan T. K. The radiochemistry of americium and curium, University of California, Los Alamos, California, 1960
