= Curium(III) hydroxide =

Curium hydroxide
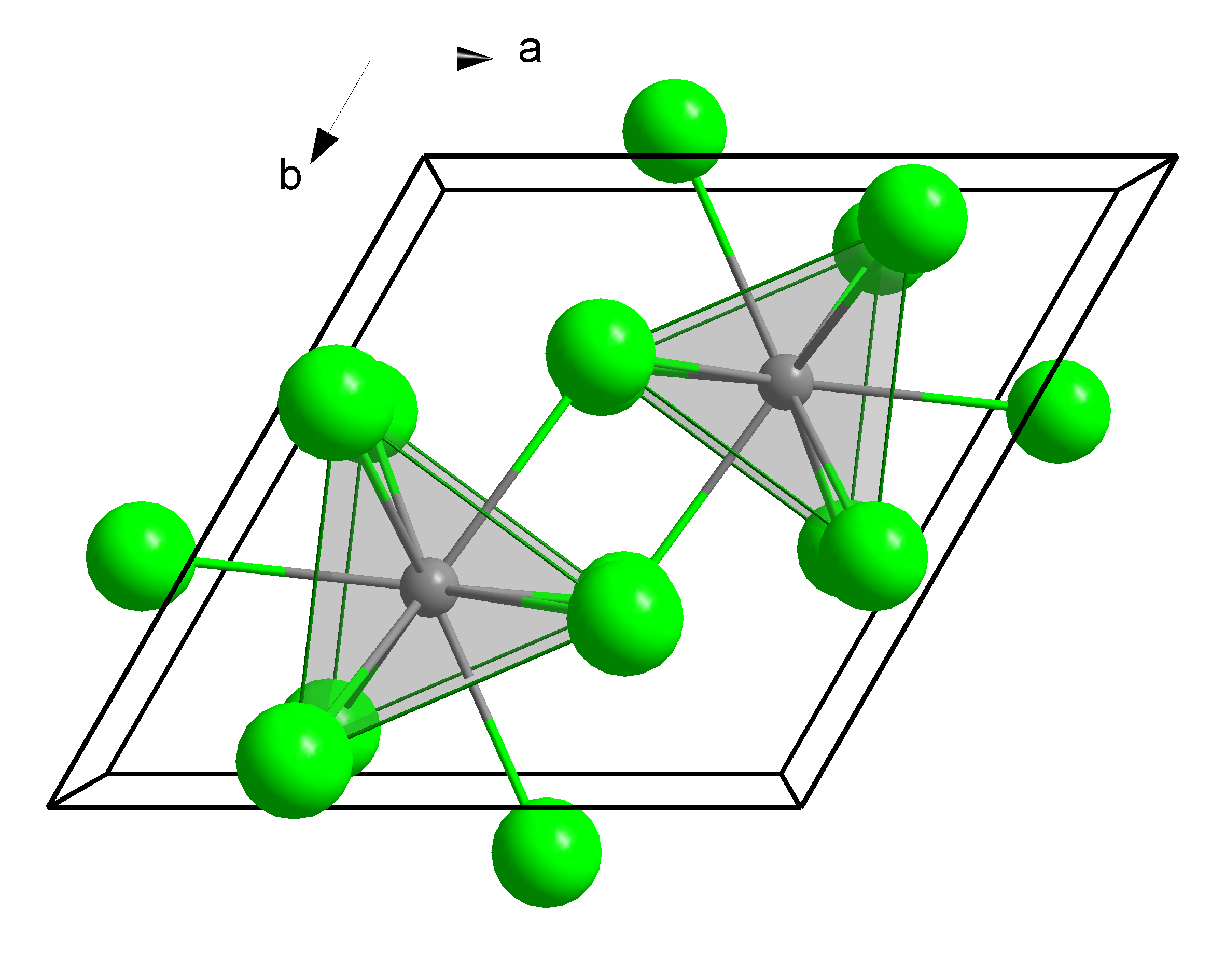
- Curium(III) hydroxide Curium hydroxide

Names
- IUPAC name Curium hydroxide
- Systematic IUPAC name Curium(3+) oxidanide

Identifiers
CAS Number	49848-26-2
3D model (JSmol)	Interactive image
PubChem CID	14648287
CompTox Dashboard (EPA)	DTXSID101311287
- InChI: InChI=1S/Cm.3H2O/h;3*1H2/q+3;;;/p-3 Key: ZOFUDUXHUCRFKX-UHFFFAOYSA-K
- SMILES: [OH-].[OH-].[OH-].[Cm+3]

Properties
Chemical formula	CmH_{3}O_{3}
Molar mass	298 g·mol^{−1}
Appearance	colorless or pale yellow solid
Solubility in water	insoluble

Structure
Crystal structure	hexagonal, UCl_{3} structure
Space group	P6_{3}/m, No. 176
Lattice constant	a = 639,1 pm, c = 371,2 pm
- Except where otherwise noted, data are given for materials in their standard state (at 25 °C [77 °F], 100 kPa). verify (what is ?) Infobox references

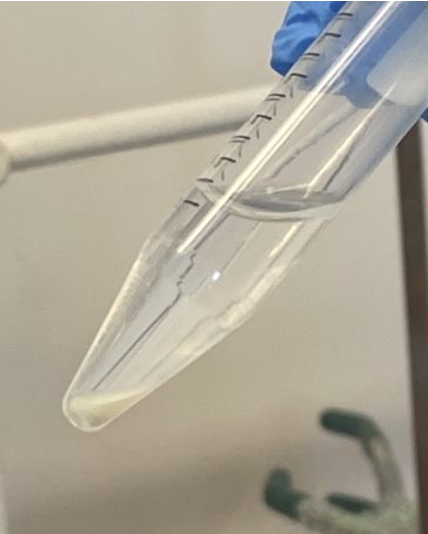
Precipitated Cm(III) hydroxide

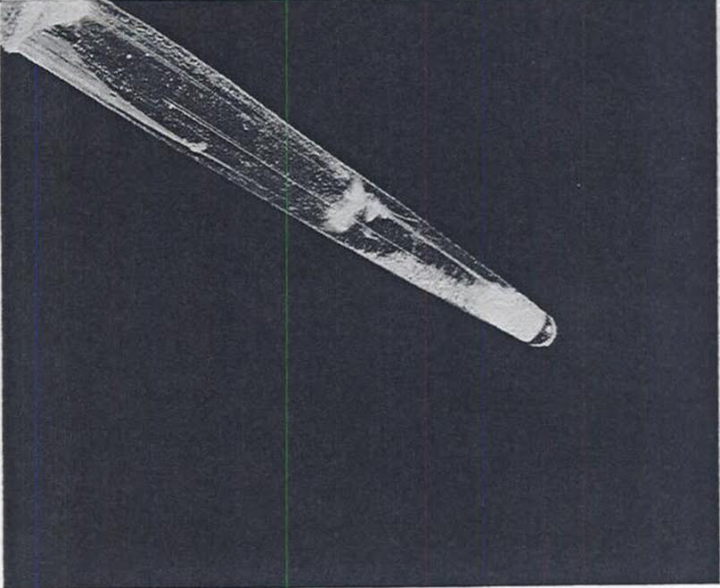
Curium hydroxide in the bottom of a microcentrifuge cone, fall 1947

Curium hydroxide Cm(OH)_{3} is a radioactive compound first discovered in measurable quantities in 1947. It is composed of a single curium atom and three hydroxy groups. It was the first curium compound ever isolated.

Curium hydroxide is an anhydrous colorless or light-yellow amorphous gelatinous solid that is insoluble in water.

Due to self-irradiation, the crystal structure of ^{244}Cm(OH)_{3} decomposes within one day (^{244}Cm has a half-life of 18.11 years); for ^{241}Am(OH)_{3} the same process takes 4 to 6 months (^{241}Am has a half-life of 432.2 years).

== See also ==
- Curium(III) oxide
