= Americium dioxide =

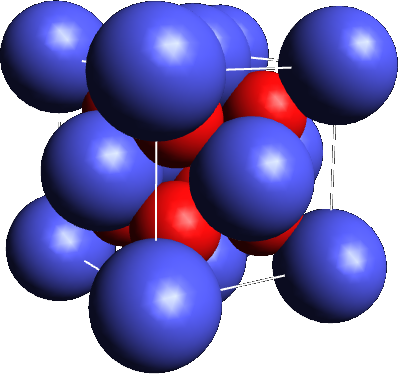
- Americium dioxide

Names
- IUPAC name Americium(IV) oxide

Identifiers
CAS Number	12005-67-3
3D model (JSmol)	Interactive image
ChemSpider	64878971
ECHA InfoCard	100.031.324
EC Number	234-471-0
PubChem CID	57461988
CompTox Dashboard (EPA)	DTXSID40894182
- InChI: InChI=1S/Am.2O/q+4;2*-2 Key: GABXYUQCUHMHDP-UHFFFAOYSA-N
- SMILES: [O--].[O--].[Am+4]

Properties
Chemical formula	AmO_{2}
Molar mass	275 g·mol^{−1}
Appearance	Black crystals
Density	11.68 g/cm^{3}
Melting point	2,113 °C (3,835 °F; 2,386 K)

Structure
Crystal structure	Fluorite (cubic), cF12
Space group	Fm3̅m, No. 225
Lattice constant	a = 537.6 pm
Formula units (Z)	4

Related compounds
Other cations	Plutonium(IV) oxide Curium(IV) oxide
- Except where otherwise noted, data are given for materials in their standard state (at 25 °C [77 °F], 100 kPa). verify (what is ?) Infobox references

Americium dioxide (AmO_{2}) is a black compound of americium. In the solid state, AmO_{2} adopts a fluorite structure (like CaF_{2}). It is used as a source of alpha particles.

== Historical context ==
The demand for americium dioxide stems from the difficulty of storing the element americium as a solution of americium(III) chloride because the alpha radiation and hydrochloric acid decomposes storage containers over time. To solve the liquid storage problem, scientists at Oak Ridge National Laboratory devised a synthesis to turn liquid americium–acid solution into a precipitated form of americium for safer handling and more efficient storage.

== Synthesis ==
Synthesis of americium dioxide, as described by the Oak Ridge National Laboratory in 1960, starts by dissolving americium in hydrochloric acid, and then neutralizing the excess acid with ammonium hydroxide (NH_{4}OH). Then, saturated oxalic acid solution (C_{2}H_{2}O_{4}) is added to the now neutralized solution to precipitate dull pink americium(III) oxalate crystals; once complete precipitation is achieved, additional oxalic acid is added to make a slurry. The slurry of americium oxalate and oxalic acid is next agitated before the americium oxalate is filtered out, washed with water, and partially dried in air.

The americium oxalate is then calcinated in a platinum boat. It is first dried in a furnace at 150 °C (302 °F) and then heated to 350 °C (662 °F). When decomposition begins to occur, the oxalate will turn into the desired black americium dioxide; to ensure no oxalate remains in the newly forming dioxide, the oven temperature is increased and held at 800 °C (1,470 °F) then slowly allowed to cool to room temperature.

== Modern applications ==
Americium dioxide is the most widely used americium compound in ionising smoke detectors. The dioxide form is insoluble in water, making it relatively safe to handle in production.

In the late 2010s, americium dioxide has been of interest to ESA as power source for radioisotope thermoelectric generators (RTGs) for deep space exploration spacecraft and satellites. A fully automated chemical process to produce americium dioxide was developed by nuclear researchers from the University of Bristol to be implemented on the Sellafield nuclear site in Cumbria, UK. It is based on the same principles as the historic production method developed at Oak Ridge National Laboratory.

== Americium-aluminium alloys ==
Americium-aluminium alloys can be formed by melting americium dioxide with aluminium and an additional fluxing agent. The created alloy can undergo neutron irradiation to produce other transuranic nuclides.
