= Americium iodide =

Americium iodide may refer to:

- Americium(II) iodide
- Americium(III) iodide
