= Americium fluoride =

Americium fluoride may refer to:

- Americium(III) fluoride
- Americium(IV) fluoride
- Americium hexafluoride (hypothetical)
