= Americium =

Americium, _{95}Am
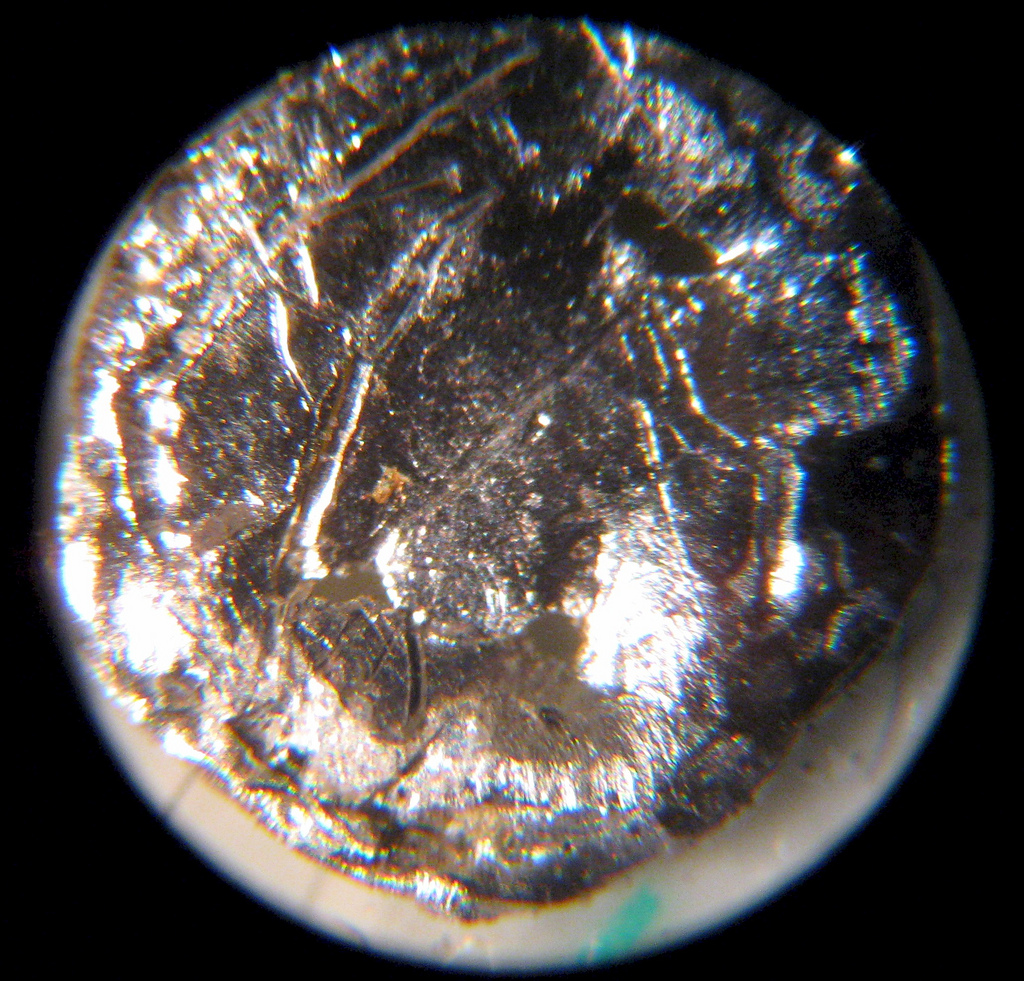
- A small disc of americium-241 metal under a microscope

Americium
- Pronunciation: /ˌæməˈrɪsiəm/ (AM-ər-ISS-ee-əm)
- Appearance: silvery white
- Mass number: [243]

Americium in the periodic table
Hydrogen																															Helium
Lithium	Beryllium																									Boron	Carbon	Nitrogen	Oxygen	Fluorine	Neon
Sodium	Magnesium																									Aluminium	Silicon	Phosphorus	Sulfur	Chlorine	Argon
Potassium	Calcium															Scandium	Titanium	Vanadium	Chromium	Manganese	Iron	Cobalt	Nickel	Copper	Zinc	Gallium	Germanium	Arsenic	Selenium	Bromine	Krypton
Rubidium	Strontium															Yttrium	Zirconium	Niobium	Molybdenum	Technetium	Ruthenium	Rhodium	Palladium	Silver	Cadmium	Indium	Tin	Antimony	Tellurium	Iodine	Xenon
Caesium	Barium	Lanthanum	Cerium	Praseodymium	Neodymium	Promethium	Samarium	Europium	Gadolinium	Terbium	Dysprosium	Holmium	Erbium	Thulium	Ytterbium	Lutetium	Hafnium	Tantalum	Tungsten	Rhenium	Osmium	Iridium	Platinum	Gold	Mercury (element)	Thallium	Lead	Bismuth	Polonium	Astatine	Radon
Francium	Radium	Actinium	Thorium	Protactinium	Uranium	Neptunium	Plutonium	Americium	Curium	Berkelium	Californium	Einsteinium	Fermium	Mendelevium	Nobelium	Lawrencium	Rutherfordium	Dubnium	Seaborgium	Bohrium	Hassium	Meitnerium	Darmstadtium	Roentgenium	Copernicium	Nihonium	Flerovium	Moscovium	Livermorium	Tennessine	Oganesson
Eu
↑
Am
↓
(Ubs)
plutonium ← americium → curium
- Atomic number (Z): 95
- Group: f-block groups (no number)
- Period: period 7
- Block: f-block
- Electron configuration: [Rn] 5f^{7} 7s^{2}
- Electrons per shell: 2, 8, 18, 32, 25, 8, 2

Physical properties
- Phase at STP: solid
- Melting point: 1449 K (1176 °C, 2149 °F)
- Boiling point: 2880 K (2607 °C, 4725 °F) (calculated)
- Density (near r.t.): 12 g/cm^{3}
- Heat of fusion: 14.39 kJ/mol
- Molar heat capacity: 28 J/(mol·K)
Vapor pressure
P (Pa)	1	10	100	1 k	10 k	100 k
at T (K)	1239	1356				

Atomic properties
- Oxidation states: common: +3 +2, +4, +5, +6, +7
- Electronegativity: Pauling scale: 1.3
- Ionization energies: 1st: 578 kJ/mol
- Atomic radius: empirical: 173 pm
- Covalent radius: 180±6 pm
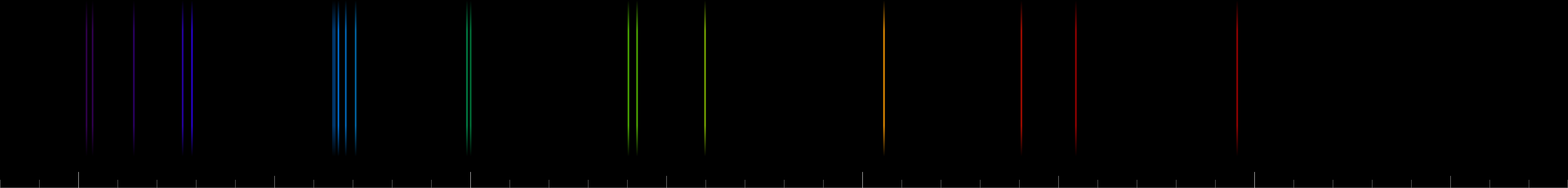
- Spectral lines of americium

Other properties
- Natural occurrence: synthetic
- Crystal structure: double hexagonal close-packed (dhcp)
- Thermal conductivity: 10 W/(m⋅K)
- Electrical resistivity: 0.69 µΩ⋅m
- Magnetic ordering: paramagnetic
- Molar magnetic susceptibility: +1000.0×10^{−6} cm^{3}/mol
- CAS Number: 7440-35-9

History
- Naming: after the Americas
- Discovery: Glenn T. Seaborg, Ralph A. James, Leon O. Morgan, Albert Ghiorso (1944)

Isotopes of americium
Main isotopes			Decay	
Isotope	abundance	half-life (t_{1/2})	mode	product
^{241}Am	trace	432.6 y	α	^{237}Np
^{241}Am	trace	432.6 y	SF	–
^{242}Am	synth	16.02 h	β^{−}	^{242}Cm
^{242}Am	synth	16.02 h	ε	^{242}Pu
^{242m1}Am	synth	141 y	IT	^{242}Am
^{242m1}Am	synth	141 y	α	^{238}Np
^{243}Am	synth	7350 y	α	^{239}Np
^{243}Am	synth	7350 y	SF	–

Americium is a synthetic chemical element; it has symbol Am and atomic number 95. It is radioactive and a transuranic member of the actinide series in the periodic table, located under the lanthanide element europium and was thus named after the Americas by analogy.

Americium was first produced in 1944 by the group of Glenn T. Seaborg from Berkeley, California, at the Metallurgical Laboratory of the University of Chicago, as part of the Manhattan Project. Although it is the third element in the transuranic series, it was discovered fourth, after the heavier curium. The discovery was kept secret and released to the public only in November 1945. Most americium is produced by uranium or plutonium being bombarded with neutrons in nuclear reactors – one tonne of spent nuclear fuel contains about 100 grams of americium. It is widely used in commercial ionization chamber smoke detectors, as well as in neutron sources and industrial gauges. Several unusual applications, such as nuclear batteries or fuel for space ships with nuclear propulsion, have been proposed for the isotope ^{242m}Am, but they are as yet hindered by the scarcity and high price of this nuclear isomer.

Americium is a relatively soft radioactive metal with a silvery appearance. Its most common isotopes are ^{241}Am and ^{243}Am. In chemical compounds, americium usually assumes the oxidation state +3, especially in solutions. Several other oxidation states are known, ranging from +2 to +7, and can be identified by their characteristic optical absorption spectra. The crystal lattices of solid americium and its compounds contain small intrinsic radiogenic defects due to metamictization induced by self-irradiation with alpha particles. These defects accumulate with time, which can cause a drift of some material properties and is more noticeable in older samples.

== History ==
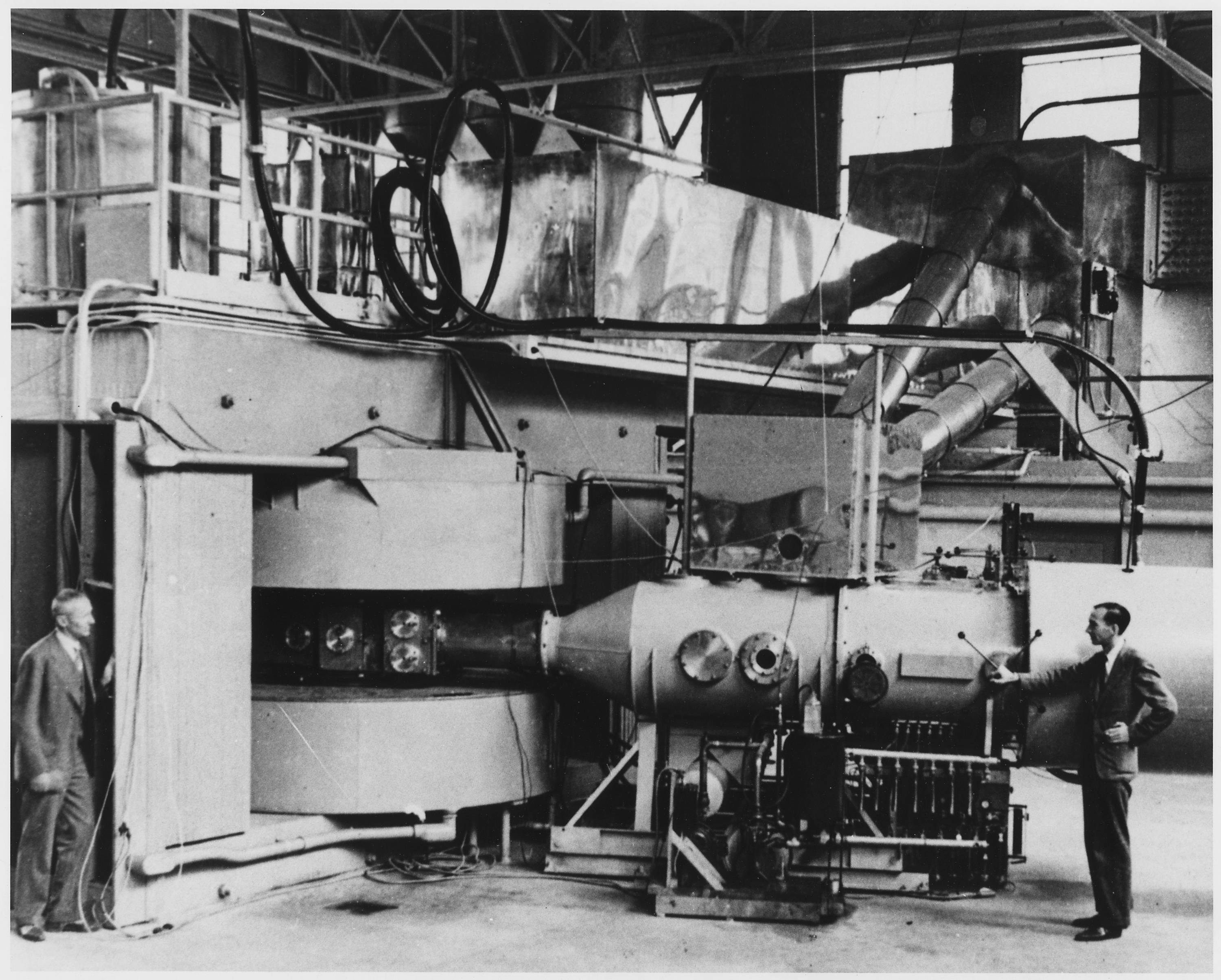
The 60-inch cyclotron at the Lawrence Radiation Laboratory, University of California, Berkeley, in August 1939

Although americium was likely produced in previous nuclear experiments, it was first intentionally synthesized, isolated and identified in late autumn 1944, at the University of California, Berkeley, by Glenn T. Seaborg, Leon O. Morgan, Ralph A. James, and Albert Ghiorso. They used a 60-inch cyclotron at the University of California, Berkeley. The element was chemically identified at the Metallurgical Laboratory (now Argonne National Laboratory) of the University of Chicago. Following the lighter neptunium, plutonium, and heavier curium, americium was the fourth transuranium element to be discovered. At the time, the periodic table had been restructured by Seaborg to its present layout, containing the actinide row below the lanthanide one. This led to americium being located right below its twin lanthanide element europium; it was thus by analogy named after the Americas: "The name americium (after the Americas) and the symbol Am are suggested for the element on the basis of its position as the sixth member of the actinide rare-earth series, analogous to europium, Eu, of the lanthanide series."

The new element was isolated from its oxides in a complex, multi-step process. First plutonium-239 nitrate solution was coated on a platinum foil of about 0.5 cm^{2} area, the solution was evaporated and the residue was converted into plutonium dioxide (PuO_{2}) by calcining. After cyclotron irradiation, the coating was dissolved with nitric acid, and then precipitated as the hydroxide using concentrated aqueous ammonia solution. The residue was dissolved in perchloric acid. Further separation was carried out by ion exchange, yielding a certain isotope of curium. The separation of curium and americium was so painstaking that those elements were initially called by the Berkeley group as pandemonium (from Greek for all demons or hell) and delirium (from Latin for madness).

Initial experiments yielded four americium isotopes: ^{241}Am, ^{242}Am, ^{239}Am and ^{238}Am. Americium-241 was directly obtained from plutonium upon absorption of two neutrons. It decays by emission of a α-particle to ^{237}Np; the half-life of this decay was first determined as 510±20 years but then corrected to 432.2 years.

$$\ce{^{239}_{94}Pu ->[\ce{(n,\gamma)}] ^{240}_{94}Pu ->[\ce{(n,\gamma)}] ^{241}_{94}Pu ->[\beta^-][14.35\ \ce{yr}] ^{241}_{95}Am}\ \left( \ce{->[\alpha][432.2\ \ce{yr}] ^{237}_{93}Np} \right)$$

The times are half-lives

The second isotope ^{242}Am was produced upon neutron bombardment of the already-created ^{241}Am. Upon rapid β-decay, ^{242}Am converts into the isotope of curium ^{242}Cm (which had been discovered previously). The half-life of this decay was initially determined at 17 hours, which was close to the presently accepted value of 16.02 h.

$$\ce{^{241}_{95}Am ->[\ce{(n,\gamma)}] ^{242}_{95}Am}\ \left(\ce{->[\beta^-][16.02\ \ce{h}] ^{242}_{96}Cm} \right)$$

The discovery of americium and curium in 1944 was closely related to the Manhattan Project; the results were confidential and declassified only in 1945. Seaborg leaked the synthesis of the elements 95 and 96 on the U.S. radio show for children Quiz Kids five days before the official presentation at an American Chemical Society meeting on 11 November 1945, when one of the listeners asked whether any new transuranium element besides plutonium and neptunium had been discovered during the war. After the discovery of americium isotopes ^{241}Am and ^{242}Am, their production and compounds were patented listing only Seaborg as the inventor. The initial americium samples weighed a few micrograms; they were barely visible and were identified by their radioactivity. The first substantial amounts of metallic americium, weighing 40–200 micrograms, were not prepared until 1951 by reduction of americium(III) fluoride with barium metal in high vacuum at 1100 °C.

== Occurrence ==
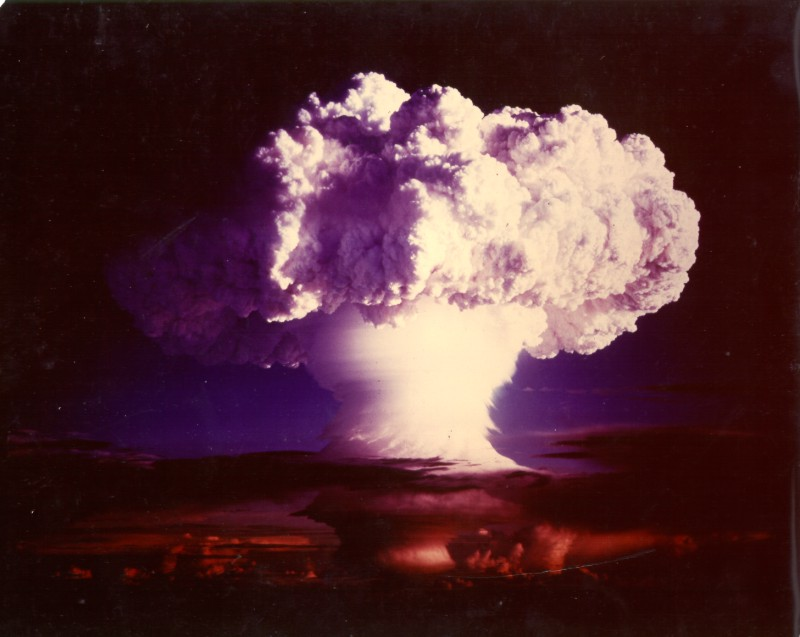
Americium was detected in the fallout from the Ivy Mike nuclear test.

The longest-lived and most common isotopes of americium, ^{241}Am and ^{243}Am, have half-lives of 432.6 and 7,350 years, respectively. Therefore, any primordial americium (americium that was present on Earth during its formation) should have decayed by now. Trace amounts of americium probably occur naturally in uranium minerals as a result of neutron capture and beta decay (^{238}U → ^{239}Pu → ^{240}Pu → ^{241}Am), though the quantities would be tiny and this has not been confirmed. Extraterrestrial long-lived ^{247}Cm is probably also deposited on Earth and has ^{243}Am as one of its intermediate decay products, but again this has not been confirmed.

Existing americium is concentrated in the areas used for the atmospheric nuclear weapons tests conducted between 1945 and 1980, as well as at the sites of nuclear incidents, such as the Chernobyl disaster. For example, the analysis of the debris at the testing site of the first U.S. hydrogen bomb, Ivy Mike, (1 November 1952, Enewetak Atoll), revealed high concentrations of various actinides including americium; but due to military secrecy, this result was not published until later, in 1956. Trinitite, the glassy residue left on the desert floor near Alamogordo, New Mexico, after the plutonium-based Trinity nuclear bomb test on 16 July 1945, contains traces of americium-241. Elevated levels of americium were also detected at the crash site of a US Boeing B-52 bomber aircraft, which carried four hydrogen bombs, in 1968 in Greenland.

In other regions, the average radioactivity of surface soil due to residual americium is only about 0.01 picocuries per gram (0.37 mBq/g). Atmospheric americium compounds are poorly soluble in common solvents and mostly adhere to soil particles. Soil analysis revealed about 1,900 times higher concentration of americium inside sandy soil particles than in the water present in the soil pores; an even higher ratio was measured in loam soils.

Americium is produced mostly artificially in small quantities, for research purposes. A tonne of spent nuclear fuel contains about 100 grams of various americium isotopes, mostly ^{241}Am and ^{243}Am. Their prolonged radioactivity is undesirable for the disposal, and therefore americium, together with other long-lived actinides, must be neutralized. The associated procedure may involve several steps, where americium is first separated and then converted by neutron bombardment in special reactors to short-lived nuclides. This procedure is well known as nuclear transmutation, but it is still being developed for americium.

The transuranic elements up to fermium, including americium, should have been present in the natural nuclear fission reactor at Oklo, but any quantities produced then would have long since decayed away.

== Synthesis and extraction ==
=== Isotope nucleosynthesis ===
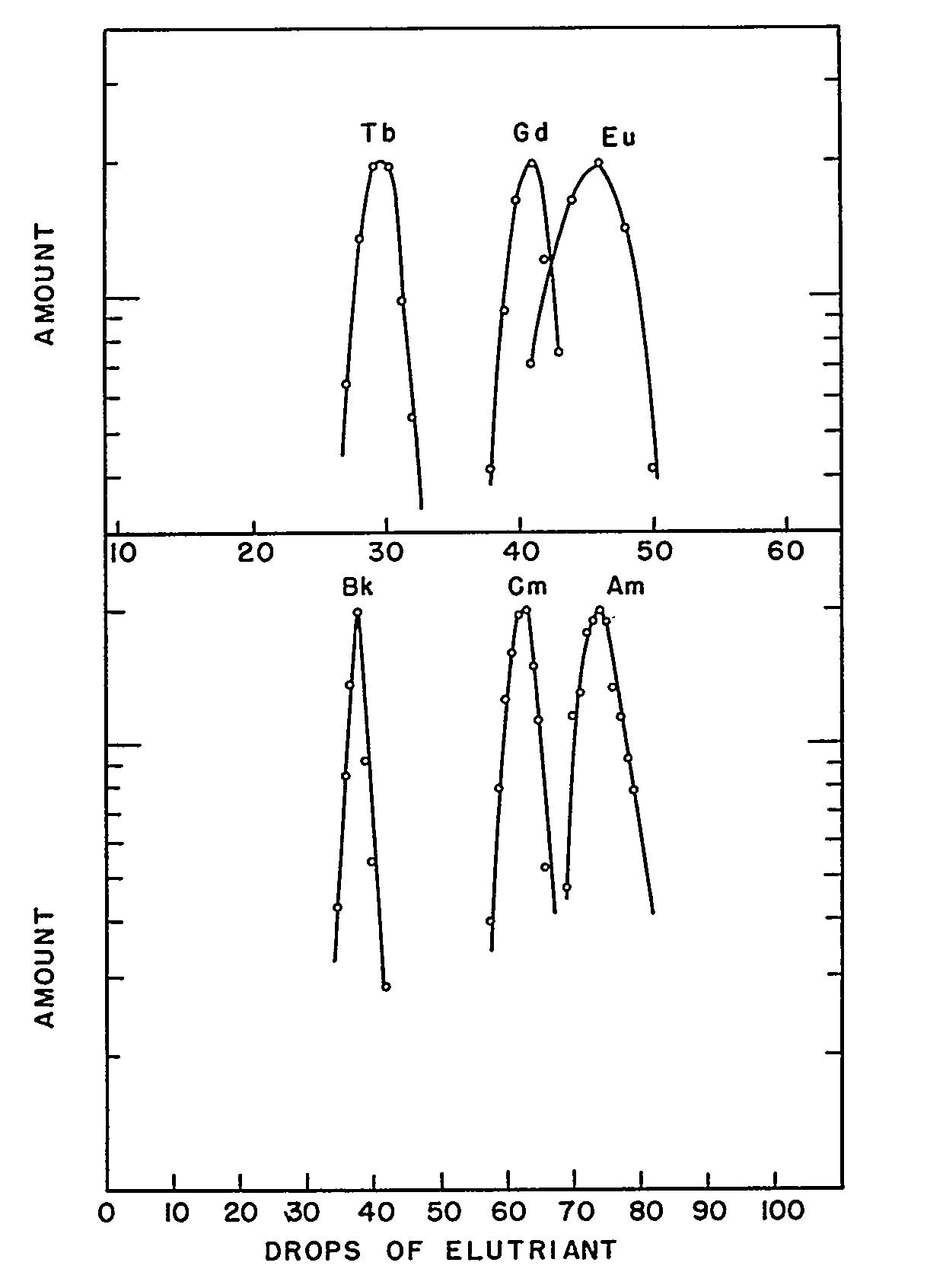
Chromatographic elution curves revealing the similarity between the lanthanides Tb, Gd, and Eu and the corresponding actinides Bk, Cm, and Am

Americium has been produced in small quantities in nuclear reactors for decades, and kilograms of its ^{241}Am and ^{243}Am isotopes have been accumulated by now. Nevertheless, since it was first offered for sale in 1962, its price, about US$1,500 per gram (US$43,000/oz) of ^{241}Am, remains almost unchanged owing to the very complex separation procedure. The heavier isotope ^{243}Am is produced in much smaller amounts; it is thus more difficult to separate, resulting in a higher cost of the order US$100,000–US$160,000 per gram (US$2,800,000–US$4,500,000/oz).

Americium is not synthesized directly from uranium – the most common reactor material – but from the plutonium isotope ^{239}Pu. The latter needs to be produced first, according to the following nuclear process:

$$\ce{^{238}_{92}U ->[\ce{(n,\gamma)}] ^{239}_{92}U ->[\beta^-][23.5 \ \ce{min}] ^{239}_{93}Np ->[\beta^-][2.3565 \ \ce{d}] ^{239}_{94}Pu}$$

The capture of two neutrons by ^{239}Pu (a so-called (n,γ) reaction), followed by a β-decay, results in ^{241}Am:

$$\ce{^{239}_{94}Pu ->[\ce{2(n,\gamma)}] ^{241}_{94}Pu ->[\beta^-][14.35 \ \ce{yr}] ^{241}_{95}Am}$$

The plutonium present in spent nuclear fuel contains about 12% of ^{241}Pu. Because it beta-decays to ^{241}Am, ^{241}Pu can be extracted and may be used to generate further ^{241}Am. However, this process is rather slow: half of the original amount of ^{241}Pu decays to ^{241}Am after about 15 years, and the ^{241}Am amount reaches a maximum after 70 years.

The obtained ^{241}Am can be used for generating heavier americium isotopes by further neutron capture inside a nuclear reactor. In a light water reactor (LWR), 79% of ^{241}Am converts to ^{242}Am and 10% to its nuclear isomer ^{242m}Am: (Note: The "m" denotes that it is a metastable state.)

$$\begin{cases}
79\%: & \ce{^{241}_{95}Am ->[\ce{(n,\gamma)}] ^{242}_{95}Am}
\\
10\%: & \ce{^{241}_{95}Am ->[\ce{(n,\gamma)}] ^{242 m}_{95}Am}
\end{cases}$$

Americium-242 has a half-life of only 16 hours, which makes its further conversion to ^{243}Am extremely inefficient. The latter isotope is produced instead in a process where ^{239}Pu captures four neutrons under high neutron flux:

$$\ce{^{239}_{94}Pu ->[\ce{4(n,\gamma)}] \ ^{243}_{94}Pu ->[\beta^-][4.956 \ \ce{h}] ^{243}_{95}Am}$$

=== Metal generation ===
Most synthesis routines yield a mixture of different actinide isotopes in oxide forms, from which isotopes of americium can be separated. In a typical procedure, the spent reactor fuel (e.g. MOX fuel) is dissolved in nitric acid, and the bulk of uranium and plutonium is removed using a PUREX-type extraction (Plutonium–URanium EXtraction) with tributyl phosphate in a hydrocarbon. The lanthanides and remaining actinides are then separated from the aqueous residue (raffinate) by a diamide-based extraction, to give, after stripping, a mixture of trivalent actinides and lanthanides. Americium compounds are then selectively extracted using multi-step chromatographic and centrifugation techniques with an appropriate reagent. A large amount of work has been done on the solvent extraction of americium. For example, a 2003 EU-funded project codenamed "EUROPART" studied triazines and other compounds as potential extraction agents. A bis-triazinyl bipyridine complex was proposed in 2009 as such a reagent is highly selective to americium (and curium). Separation of americium from the highly similar curium can be achieved by treating a slurry of their hydroxides in aqueous sodium bicarbonate with ozone, at elevated temperatures. Both Am and Cm are mostly present in solutions in the +3 valence state; whereas curium remains unchanged, americium oxidizes to soluble Am(IV) complexes which can be washed away.

Metallic americium is obtained by reduction from its compounds. Americium(III) fluoride was first used for this purpose. The reaction was conducted using elemental barium as reducing agent in a water- and oxygen-free environment inside an apparatus made of tantalum and tungsten.

$$\mathrm{2\ AmF_3\ +\ 3\ Ba\ \longrightarrow \ 2\ Am\ +\ 3\ BaF_2}$$

An alternative is the reduction of americium dioxide by metallic lanthanum or thorium:

$$\mathrm{3\ AmO_2\ +\ 4\ La\ \longrightarrow \ 3\ Am\ +\ 2\ La_2O_3}$$

== Properties ==
=== Physical ===
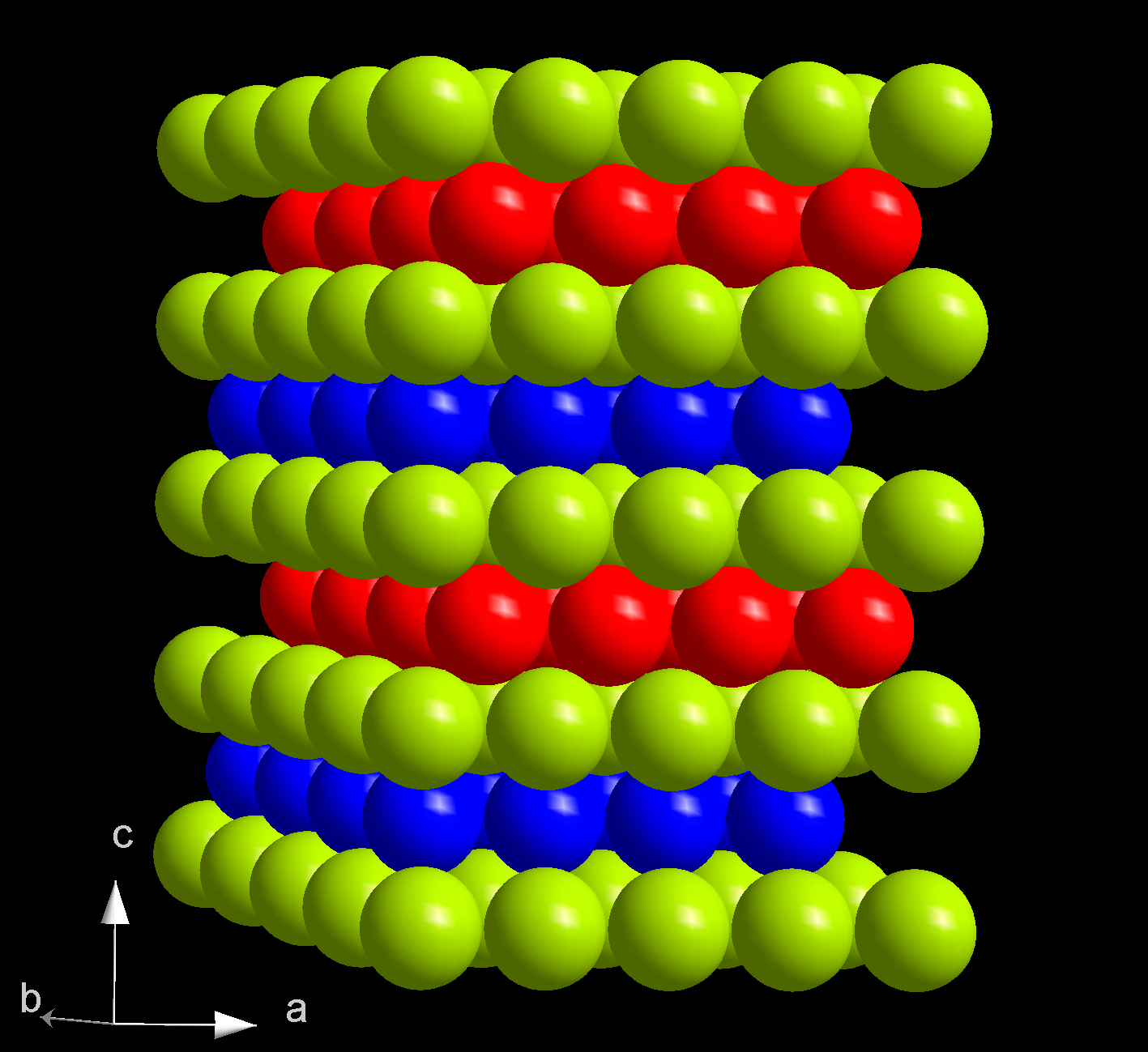
Double-hexagonal close packing with the layer sequence ABAC in the crystal structure of α-americium (A: green, B: blue, C: red)

In the periodic table, americium is located to the right of plutonium, to the left of curium, and below the lanthanide europium, with which it shares many physical and chemical properties. Americium is a highly radioactive element. When freshly prepared, it has a silvery-white metallic lustre, but then slowly tarnishes in air. With a density of 12 g/cm^{3}, americium is less dense than both curium (13.52 g/cm^{3}) and plutonium (19.8 g/cm^{3}); but has a higher density than europium (5.264 g/cm^{3})—mostly because of its higher atomic mass. Americium is relatively soft and easily deformable and has a significantly lower bulk modulus than the actinides before it: Th, Pa, U, Np and Pu. Its melting point of 1173 °C is significantly higher than that of plutonium (639 °C) and europium (826 °C), but lower than for curium (1340 °C).

At ambient conditions, americium is present in its most stable α form which has a hexagonal crystal symmetry, and a space group P6_{3}/mmc with cell parameters a = 346.8 pm and c = 1124 pm, and four atoms per unit cell. The crystal consists of a double-hexagonal close packing with the layer sequence ABAC and so is isotypic with α-lanthanum and several actinides such as α-curium. The crystal structure of americium changes with pressure and temperature. When compressed at room temperature to 5 GPa, α-Am transforms to the β modification, which has a face-centered cubic (fcc) symmetry, space group Fm3̅m and lattice constant a = 489 pm. This fcc structure is equivalent to the closest packing with the sequence ABC. Upon further compression to 23 GPa, americium transforms to an orthorhombic γ-Am structure similar to that of α-uranium. There are no further transitions observed up to 52 GPa, except for an appearance of a monoclinic phase at pressures between 10 and 15 GPa. There is no consistency on the status of this phase in the literature, which also sometimes lists the α, β and γ phases as I, II and III. The β-γ transition is accompanied by a 6% decrease in the crystal volume; although theory also predicts a significant volume change for the α-β transition, it is not observed experimentally. The pressure of the α-β transition decreases with increasing temperature, and when α-americium is heated at ambient pressure, at 770 °C it changes into an fcc phase which is different from β-Am, and at 1075 °C it converts to a body-centered cubic structure. The pressure-temperature phase diagram of americium is thus rather similar to those of lanthanum, praseodymium and neodymium.

As with many other actinides, self-damage of the crystal structure due to alpha-particle irradiation is intrinsic to americium. It is especially noticeable at low temperatures, where the mobility of the produced structure defects is relatively low, by broadening of X-ray diffraction peaks. This effect makes somewhat uncertain the temperature of americium and some of its properties, such as electrical resistivity. So for americium-241, the resistivity at 4.2 K increases with time from about 2 μOhm·cm to 10 μOhm·cm after 40 hours, and saturates at about 16 μOhm·cm after 140 hours. This effect is less pronounced at room temperature, due to annihilation of radiation defects; also heating to room temperature the sample which was kept for hours at low temperatures restores its resistivity. In fresh samples, the resistivity gradually increases with temperature from about 2 μOhm·cm at liquid helium to 69 μOhm·cm at room temperature; this behavior is similar to that of neptunium, uranium, thorium and protactinium, but is different from plutonium and curium which show a rapid rise up to 60 K followed by saturation. The room temperature value for americium is lower than that of neptunium, plutonium and curium, but higher than for uranium, thorium and protactinium.

Americium is paramagnetic in a wide temperature range, from that of liquid helium, to room temperature and above. This behavior is markedly different from that of its neighbor curium which exhibits antiferromagnetic transition at 52 K. The thermal expansion coefficient of americium is slightly anisotropic and amounts to (7.5±0.2)×10^{−6} /°C along the shorter a axis and (6.2±0.4)×10^{−6} /°C for the longer c hexagonal axis. The enthalpy of dissolution of americium metal in hydrochloric acid at standard conditions is −620.6±1.3 kJ/mol, from which the standard enthalpy change of formation (Δ_{f}H°) of aqueous Am^{3+} ion is −621.2±2.0 kJ/mol. The standard potential Am^{3+}/Am^{0} is −2.08±0.01 V.

=== Chemical ===
Americium metal readily reacts with oxygen and dissolves in aqueous acids. The most stable oxidation state for americium is +3. The chemistry of americium(III) has many similarities to the chemistry of lanthanide(III) compounds. For example, trivalent americium forms insoluble fluoride, oxalate, iodate, hydroxide, phosphate and other salts. Compounds of americium in oxidation states +2, +4, +5, +6 and +7 have also been studied. This is the widest range that has been observed with actinide elements. The color of americium compounds in aqueous solution is as follows: Am^{3+} (yellow-reddish), Am^{4+} (yellow-reddish), Am^{V}O^{+}_{2}; (yellow), Am^{VI}O^{2+}_{2} (brown) and Am^{VII}O^{5−}_{6} (dark green). The absorption spectra have sharp peaks, due to f-f transitions' in the visible and near-infrared regions. Typically, Am(III) has absorption maxima at ca. 504 and 811 nm, Am(V) at ca. 514 and 715 nm, and Am(VI) at ca. 666 and 992 nm.

Americium compounds with oxidation state +4 and higher are strong oxidizing agents, comparable in strength to the permanganate ion (MnO^{−}_{4}) in acidic solutions. Whereas the Am^{4+} ions are generally unstable in solutions and readily convert to Am^{3+}, compounds such as americium dioxide (AmO_{2}) and americium(IV) fluoride (AmF_{4}) are stable in the solid state.

The pentavalent oxidation state of americium was first observed in 1951. In acidic aqueous solution the AmO^{+}_{2} ion is unstable with respect to disproportionation. The reaction

3[AmO_{2}]^{+} + 4H^{+} → 2[AmO_{2}]^{2+} + Am^{3+} + 2H_{2}O

is typical. The chemistry of Am(V) and Am(VI) is comparable to the chemistry of uranium in those oxidation states. In particular, compounds like Li_{3}AmO_{4} and Li_{6}AmO_{6} are comparable to uranates and the ion AmO^{2+}_{2} is comparable to the uranyl ion, UO^{2+}_{2}. Such compounds can be prepared by oxidation of Am(III) in dilute nitric acid with ammonium persulfate. Other oxidising agents that have been used include silver(I,III) oxide, ozone and sodium persulfate.

=== Isotopes ===
There are 19 known americium isotopes and 11 nuclear isomers, having mass numbers 229 through 247. There are two long-lived alpha-emitters; ^{243}Am has a half-life of 7,350 years and is the most stable isotope, and ^{241}Am has a half-life of 432.6 years. The most stable nuclear isomer is ^{242m1}Am – generally called simply ^{242m}Am – with a long half-life of 141 years. The half-lives of other isotopes and isomers are much shorter with a maximum of 50.8 hours for ^{240}Am. As with most other actinides, the isotopes of americium with odd number of neutrons have relatively high fissionability with thermal neutrons and low critical mass.

Americium-241 decays to ^{237}Np emitting alpha particles of several different energies, mostly at 5.486 MeV (85.2%) and 5.443 MeV (12.8%). Because the resulting states are metastable, gamma rays are also emitted at discrete energies between 26.3 and 158.5 keV, by far the strongest is at 59.5 keV.

The ground state of Americium-242 is a short-lived isotope with a half-life of 16.02 h. It mostly (82.7%) converts by β-decay to ^{242}Cm, but also by electron capture to ^{242}Pu (17.3%).

Nearly all (99.55%) of the metastable ^{242m}Am decays by internal conversion to ^{242}Am and the remaining 0.45% by α-decay to ^{238}Np.

Americium-243 transforms by α-emission into ^{239}Np.

== Chemical compounds ==
=== Oxygen compounds ===
Three americium oxides are known, with the oxidation states +2 (AmO), +3 (Am_{2}O_{3}) and +4 (AmO_{2}). Americium(II) oxide was prepared in minute amounts and has not been characterized in detail. Americium(III) oxide is a red-brown solid with a melting point of 2205 °C. Americium(IV) oxide is the main form of solid americium which is used in nearly all its applications. As most other actinide dioxides, it is a black solid with a cubic (fluorite) crystal structure.

The oxalate of americium(III), vacuum dried at room temperature, has the chemical formula Am_{2}(C_{2}O_{4})_{3}·7H_{2}O. Upon heating in vacuum, it loses water at 240 °C and starts decomposing into AmO_{2} at 300 °C, the decomposition completes at about 470 °C. The initial oxalate dissolves in nitric acid with the maximum solubility of 0.25 g/L.

=== Halides ===
Halides of americium are known for the oxidation states +2, +3 and +4, where the +3 is most stable, especially in solutions.

Oxidation state	F	Cl	Br	I
+4	Americium(IV) fluoride AmF_{4} pale pink			
+3	Americium(III) fluoride AmF_{3} pink	Americium(III) chloride AmCl_{3} pink	Americium(III) bromide AmBr_{3} light yellow	Americium(III) iodide AmI_{3} light yellow
+2		Americium(II) chloride AmCl_{2} black	Americium(II) bromide AmBr_{2} black	Americium(II) iodide AmI_{2} black

Reduction of Am(III) compounds with sodium amalgam yields Am(II) salts – the black halides AmCl_{2}, AmBr_{2} and AmI_{2}. They are very sensitive to oxygen and oxidize in water, releasing hydrogen and converting back to the Am(III) state. Specific lattice constants are:

- Orthorhombic AmCl_{2}: a = 896.3±0.8 pm, b = 757.3±0.8 pm and c = 453.2±0.6 pm
- Tetragonal AmBr_{2}: a = 1159.2±0.4 pm and c = 712.1±0.3 pm. They can also be prepared by reacting metallic americium with an appropriate mercury halide HgX_{2}, where X = Cl, Br or I:

$$\ce{{Am} + \underset{mercury\ halide}{HgX2} ->[{} \atop 400 - 500 ^\circ \ce C] {AmX2} + {Hg}}$$

Americium(III) fluoride (AmF_{3}) is poorly soluble and precipitates upon reaction of Am^{3+} and fluoride ions in weak acidic solutions:

$$\ce{Am^3+ + 3F^- -> AmF3(v)}$$

The tetravalent americium(IV) fluoride (AmF_{4}) is obtained by reacting solid americium(III) fluoride with molecular fluorine:

$$\ce{2AmF3 + F2 -> 2AmF4}$$

Another known form of solid tetravalent americium fluoride is KAmF_{5}. Tetravalent americium has also been observed in the aqueous phase. For this purpose, black Am(OH)_{4} was dissolved in 15-M NH_{4}F with the americium concentration of 0.01 M. The resulting reddish solution had a characteristic optical absorption spectrum which is similar to that of AmF_{4} but differed from other oxidation states of americium. Heating the Am(IV) solution to 90 °C did not result in its disproportionation or reduction, however a slow reduction was observed to Am(III) and assigned to self-irradiation of americium by alpha particles.

Most americium(III) halides form hexagonal crystals with slight variation of the color and exact structure between the halogens. So, chloride (AmCl_{3}) is reddish and has a structure isotypic to uranium(III) chloride (space group P6_{3}/m) and the melting point of 715 °C. The fluoride is isotypic to LaF_{3} (space group P6_{3}/mmc) and the iodide to BiI_{3} (space group R3̅). The bromide is an exception with the orthorhombic PuBr_{3}-type structure and space group Cmcm. Crystals of americium(III) chloride hexahydrate (AmCl_{3}·6H_{2}O) can be prepared by dissolving americium dioxide in hydrochloric acid and evaporating the liquid. Those crystals are hygroscopic and have yellow-reddish color and a monoclinic crystal structure.

Oxyhalides of americium in the form Am^{VI}O_{2}X_{2}, Am^{V}O_{2}X, Am^{IV}OX_{2} and Am^{III}OX can be obtained by reacting the corresponding americium halide with oxygen or Sb_{2}O_{3}, and AmOCl can also be produced by vapor phase hydrolysis:

AmCl_{3} + H_{2}O -> AmOCl + 2HCl

=== Chalcogenides and pnictides ===
The known chalcogenides of americium include the sulfide AmS_{2}, selenides AmSe_{2} and Am_{3}Se_{4}, and tellurides Am_{2}Te_{3} and AmTe_{2}. The pnictides of americium (^{243}Am) of the AmX type are known for the elements phosphorus, arsenic, antimony and bismuth. They crystallize in the rock-salt lattice.

=== Silicides and borides ===
Americium monosilicide (AmSi) and "disilicide" (nominally AmSi_{x} with: 1.87 < x < 2.0) were obtained by reduction of americium(III) fluoride with elementary silicon in vacuum at 1050 °C (AmSi) and 1150−1200 °C (AmSi_{x}). AmSi is a black solid isomorphic with LaSi, it has an orthorhombic crystal symmetry. AmSi_{x} has a bright silvery lustre and a tetragonal crystal lattice (space group I4_{1}/amd), it is isomorphic with PuSi_{2} and ThSi_{2}. Borides of americium include AmB_{4} and AmB_{6}. The tetraboride can be obtained by heating an oxide or halide of americium with magnesium diboride in vacuum or inert atmosphere.

=== Organoamericium compounds ===
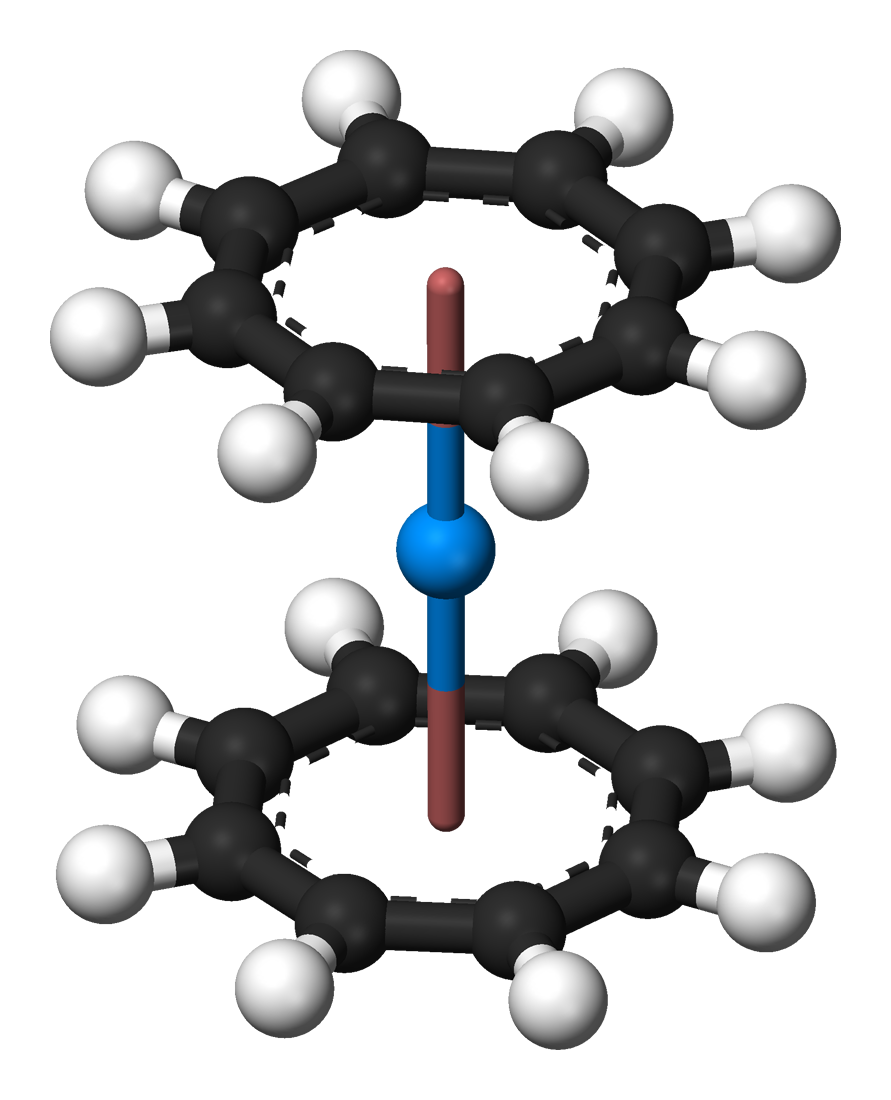
Predicted structure of amerocene [(η^{8}-C_{8}H_{8})_{2}Am]

Analogous to uranocene, americium is predicted to form the organometallic compound amerocene with two cyclooctatetraene ligands, with the chemical formula (η^{8}-C_{8}H_{8})_{2}Am. A cyclopentadienyl complex is known that is likely to be stoichiometrically AmCp_{3}.

Formation of the complexes of the type Am(n-C_{3}H_{7}-BTP)_{3}, where BTP stands for 2,6-di(1,2,4-triazin-3-yl)pyridine, in solutions containing n-C_{3}H_{7}-BTP and Am^{3+} ions has been confirmed by EXAFS. Some of these BTP-type complexes selectively interact with americium and therefore are useful in its selective separation from lanthanides and another actinides.

== Biological aspects ==
Americium is an artificial element of recent origin, and thus does not have a biological requirement. It is harmful to life. It has been proposed to use bacteria for removal of americium and other heavy metals from rivers and streams. Thus, Enterobacteriaceae of the genus Citrobacter precipitate americium ions from aqueous solutions, binding them into a metal-phosphate complex at their cell walls. Several studies have been reported on the biosorption and bioaccumulation of americium by bacteria and fungi. In the laboratory, both americium and curium were found to support the growth of methylotrophs.

== Fission ==
The isotope ^{242m}Am (half-life 141 years) has the largest cross sections for absorption of thermal neutrons (5,700 barns), that results in a small critical mass for a sustained nuclear chain reaction. The critical mass for a bare ^{242m}Am sphere is about 9–14 kg (the uncertainty results from insufficient knowledge of its material properties). It can be lowered to 3–5 kg with a metal reflector and should become even smaller with a water reflector. Such small critical mass is favorable for portable nuclear weapons, but those based on ^{242m}Am are not known yet, probably because of its scarcity and high price. The critical masses of the two readily available isotopes, ^{241}Am and ^{243}Am, are relatively high – 57.6 to 75.6 kg for ^{241}Am and 209 kg for ^{243}Am. Scarcity and high price yet hinder application of americium as a nuclear fuel in nuclear reactors.

There has been a proposal for very compact 10-kW high-flux reactors using as little as 20 grams of ^{242m}Am. Such low-power reactors would be relatively safe to use as neutron sources for radiation therapy in hospitals.

== Applications ==
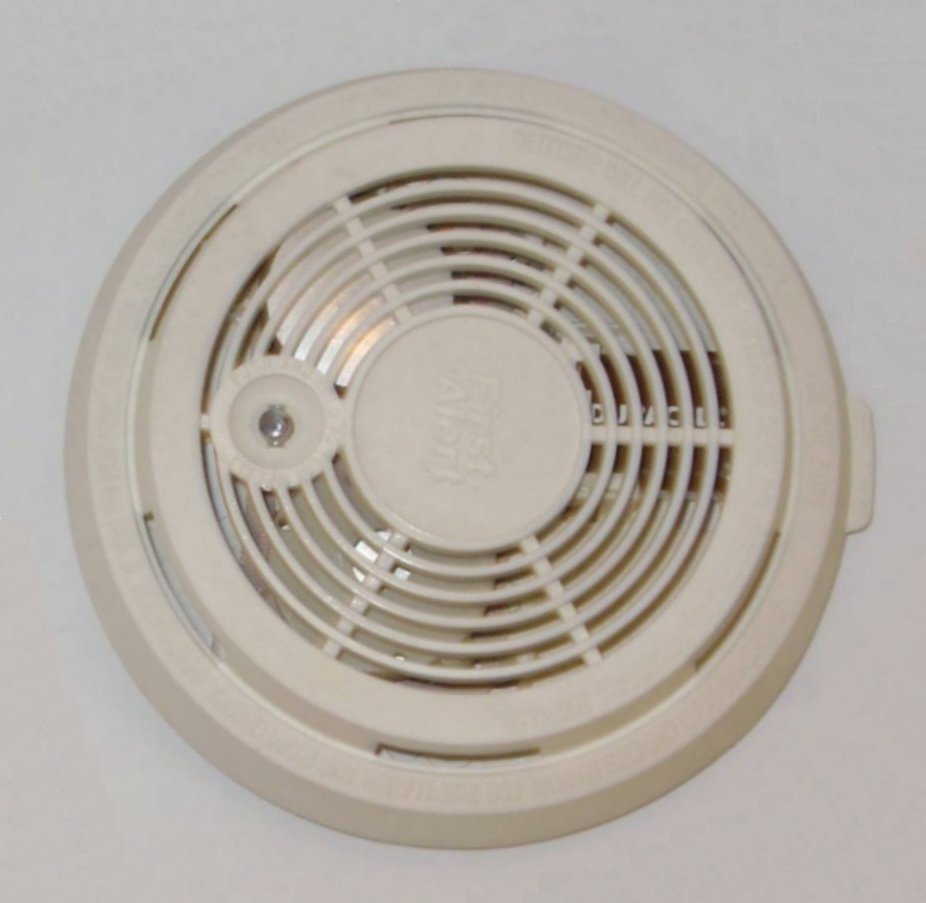

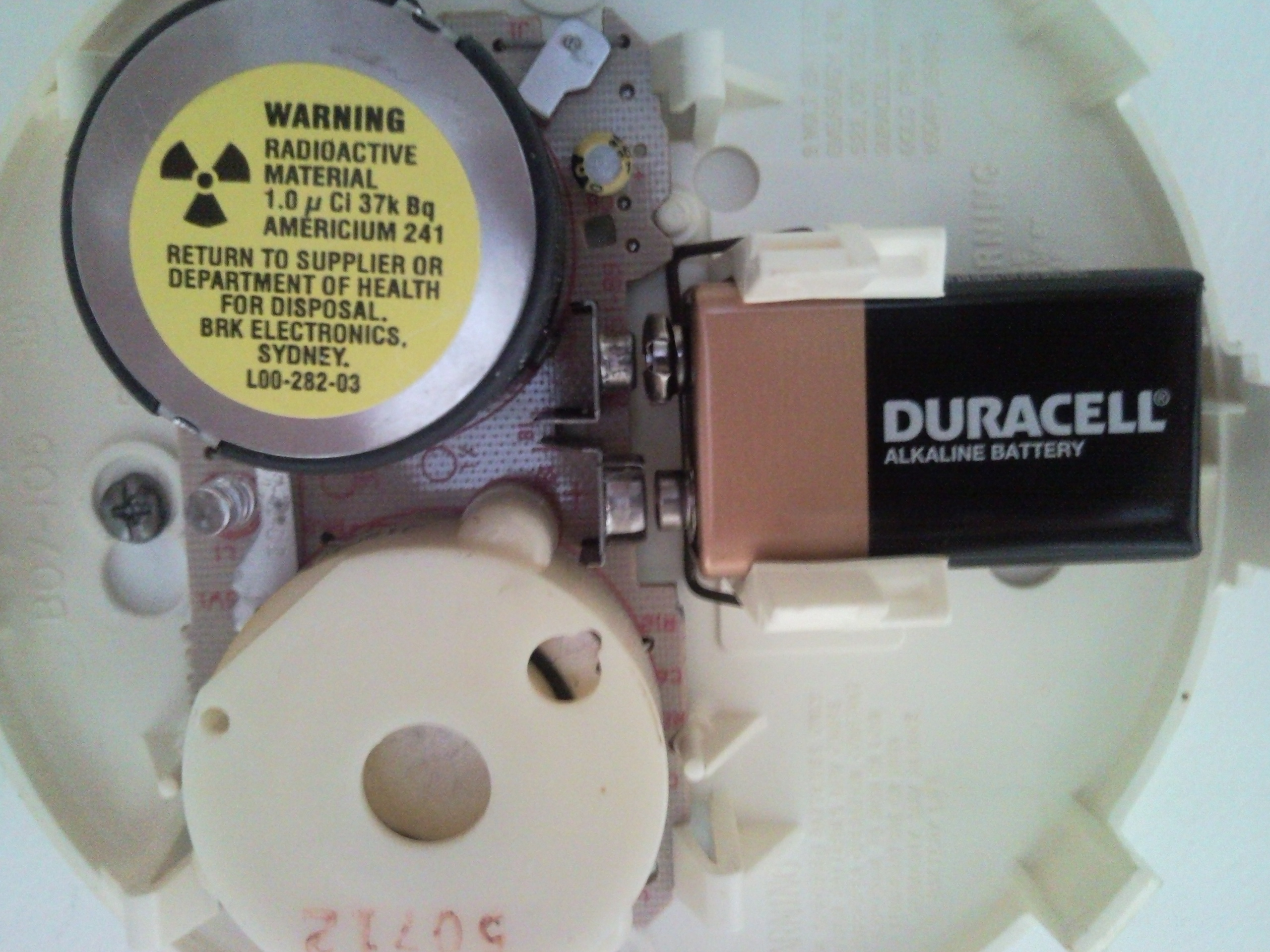
Outside and inside view of an americium-based smoke detector

=== Ionization-type smoke detector ===
Americium is used in the most common type of household smoke detector, which uses ^{241}Am in the form of americium dioxide as its source of ionizing radiation. This isotope is preferred over ^{226}Ra because it emits 5 times more alpha particles and relatively little harmful gamma radiation.

The amount of americium in a typical new smoke detector is 1 microcurie (37 kBq) or 0.29 microgram. This amount declines slowly as the americium decays into neptunium-237, a different transuranic element with a much longer half-life (about 2.14 million years). With its half-life of 432.2 years, the americium in a smoke detector includes about 3% neptunium after 19 years, and about 5% after 32 years. The radiation passes through an ionization chamber, an air-filled space between two electrodes, and permits a small, constant current between the electrodes. Any smoke that enters the chamber absorbs the alpha particles, which reduces the ionization and affects this current, triggering the alarm. Compared to the alternative optical smoke detector, the ionization smoke detector is cheaper and can detect particles which are too small to produce significant light scattering; however, it is more prone to false alarms.

=== Radionuclide ===
As ^{241}Am has a half-life roughly similar to ^{238}Pu (432.2 years vs. 87 years), it has been proposed as an active element of radioisotope thermoelectric generators, for example in spacecraft. Although americium produces less heat and electricity – the power yield is 114.7 mW/g for ^{241}Am and 6.31 mW/g for ^{243}Am (cf. 390 mW/g for ^{238}Pu) – and its radiation poses more threat to humans owing to neutron emission, the European Space Agency is considering using americium for its space probes.

Another proposed space-related application of americium is a fuel for space ships with nuclear propulsion. It relies on the very high rate of nuclear fission of ^{242m}Am, which can be maintained even in a micrometer-thick foil. Small thickness avoids the problem of self-absorption of emitted radiation. This problem is pertinent to uranium or plutonium rods, in which only surface layers provide alpha-particles. The fission products of ^{242m}Am can either directly propel the spaceship or they can heat a thrusting gas. They can also transfer their energy to a fluid and generate electricity through a magnetohydrodynamic generator.

One proposal which utilizes the high nuclear fission rate of ^{242m}Am is a nuclear battery. Its design relies not on the energy emitted by americium alpha particles but on their charge. In this way the americium acts as a self-sustaining cathode. A single 3.2 kg ^{242m}Am charge of such a battery could provide about 140 kW of power over a period of 80 days. Even with all the potential benefits, the current applications of ^{242m}Am are as yet hindered by the scarcity and high price of this particular nuclear isomer.

In 2019, researchers at the UK National Nuclear Laboratory and the University of Leicester demonstrated the use of heat generated by americium to illuminate a small light bulb. This technology could lead to systems to power missions with durations up to 400 years into interstellar space, where solar panels do not function.

=== Neutron source ===
The oxide of ^{241}Am pressed with beryllium is an efficient neutron source. Here americium acts as the alpha source, and beryllium produces neutrons owing to its large cross-section for the (α,n) nuclear reaction:

$$\ce{^{241}_{95}Am -> ^{237}_{93}Np + ^{4}_{2}He + \gamma}$$

$$\ce{^{9}_{4}Be + ^{4}_{2}He -> ^{12}_{6}C + ^{1}_{0}n + \gamma}$$

The most widespread use of ^{241}AmBe neutron sources is a neutron probe – a device used to measure the quantity of water present in soil, as well as moisture/density for quality control in highway construction. ^{241}Am neutron sources are also used in well logging applications, as well as in neutron radiography, tomography and other radiochemical investigations.

=== Production of other elements ===
Americium is a starting material for the production of other transuranic elements and transactinides – for example, 82.7% of ^{242}Am decays to ^{242}Cm and 17.3% to ^{242}Pu. In the nuclear reactor, ^{242}Am is also up-converted by neutron capture to ^{243}Am and ^{244}Am, which transforms by β-decay to ^{244}Cm:

$$\ce{^{243}_{95}Am ->[\ce{(n,\gamma)}] ^{244}_{95}Am ->[\beta^-][10.1 \ \ce{h}] ^{244}_{96}Cm}$$

Irradiation of ^{241}Am by ^{12}C or ^{22}Ne ions yields the isotopes ^{247}Es (einsteinium) or ^{260}Db (dubnium), respectively. Furthermore, the element berkelium (^{243}Bk isotope) had been first intentionally produced and identified by bombarding ^{241}Am with alpha particles, in 1949, by the same Berkeley group, using the same 60-inch cyclotron. Similarly, nobelium was produced at the Joint Institute for Nuclear Research, Dubna, Russia, in 1965 in several reactions, one of which included irradiation of ^{243}Am with ^{15}N ions. Besides, one of the synthesis reactions for lawrencium, discovered by scientists at Berkeley and Dubna, included bombardment of ^{243}Am with ^{18}O.

=== Spectrometer ===
Americium-241 has been used as a portable source of both gamma rays and alpha particles for a number of medical and industrial uses. The 59.5409 keV gamma ray emissions from ^{241}Am in such sources can be used for indirect analysis of materials in radiography and X-ray fluorescence spectroscopy, as well as for quality control in fixed nuclear density gauges and nuclear densometers. For example, the element has been employed to gauge glass thickness to help create flat glass. Americium-241 is also suitable for calibration of gamma-ray spectrometers in the low-energy range, since its spectrum consists of nearly a single peak and negligible Compton continuum (at least three orders of magnitude lower intensity). Americium-241 gamma rays were also used to provide passive diagnosis of thyroid function by stimulating characteristic X-ray emission from iodine atoms. This medical application has been replaced with radioactive iodine tests.

== Health concerns ==
As a highly radioactive element, americium and its compounds must be handled only in an appropriate laboratory under special arrangements. Although most americium isotopes predominantly emit alpha particles which can be blocked by thin layers of common materials, many of the daughter products emit gamma-rays and neutrons which have a long penetration depth.

If consumed, most of the americium is excreted within a few days, with only 0.05% absorbed in the blood, of which roughly 45% goes to the liver and 45% to the bones, and the remaining 10% is excreted. The uptake to the liver depends on the individual and increases with age. In the bones, americium is first deposited over cortical and trabecular surfaces and slowly redistributes over the bone with time. The biological half-life of ^{241}Am is 50 years in the bones and 20 years in the liver, whereas in the gonads (testicles and ovaries) it remains permanently; in all these organs, americium promotes formation of cancer cells as a result of its radioactivity.

Americium often enters landfills from discarded smoke detectors. The rules associated with the disposal of smoke detectors are relaxed in most jurisdictions. In 1994, 17-year-old David Hahn extracted the americium from about 100 smoke detectors in an attempt to build a breeder nuclear reactor. There have been a few cases of exposure to americium, the worst case being that of Harold McCluskey, a chemical operations technician who at the age of 64 was exposed to 500 times the occupational standard for americium-241 as a result of an explosion in his lab. McCluskey died at the age of 75 of unrelated pre-existing disease.

== See also ==
- Actinides in the environment
- Category:Americium compounds

== Bibliography ==
- Greenwood, Norman N.; Earnshaw, Alan (1997). Chemistry of the Elements (2nd ed.). Butterworth-Heinemann. doi:10.1016/C2009-0-30414-6. ISBN 978-0-08-037941-8.
- Penneman, R. A. and Keenan T. K. The radiochemistry of americium and curium, University of California, Los Alamos, California, 1960
- Wiberg, Nils (2007). Lehrbuch Der Anorganischen Chemie. De Gruyter. ISBN 978-3-11-017770-1.
