= Americium(III) bromide =

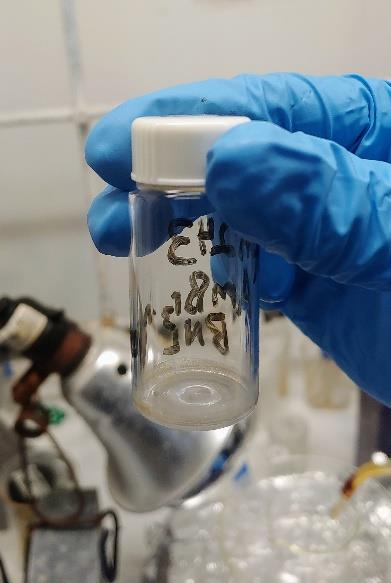

Names
- IUPAC name Americium(III) bromide
- Other names Americium tribromide

Identifiers
CAS Number	14933-38-1
3D model (JSmol)	Interactive image
- InChI: InChI=1S/Am.3BrH/h;3*1H/q+3;;;/p-3 Key: XENOUKVNIOSNMO-UHFFFAOYSA-K
- SMILES: [Br-].[Br-].[Br-].[Am+3]

Properties
Chemical formula	AmBr_{3}
Molar mass	483 g·mol^{−1}
Appearance	White crystalline solid
Density	6850 kg/m^{3}

Structure
Crystal structure	Plutonium(III) bromide structure type (orthorhombic)
Space group	Ccmm
Lattice constant	a = 12.6, b = 4.10, c = 9.10

Related compounds
Other anions	Americium(III) fluoride Americium(III) chloride Americium(III) iodide
Other cations	Plutonium(III) bromide Curium(III) bromide Europium(III) bromide
Related americium bromides	Americium(II) bromide
- Except where otherwise noted, data are given for materials in their standard state (at 25 °C [77 °F], 100 kPa). Infobox references

Americium(III) bromide or americium tribromide is the chemical compound composed of americium and bromine with the formula AmBr_{3}, with americium in a +3 oxidation state. The compound is a crystalline solid.
