= Nuclear densitometry =

Density metering technique

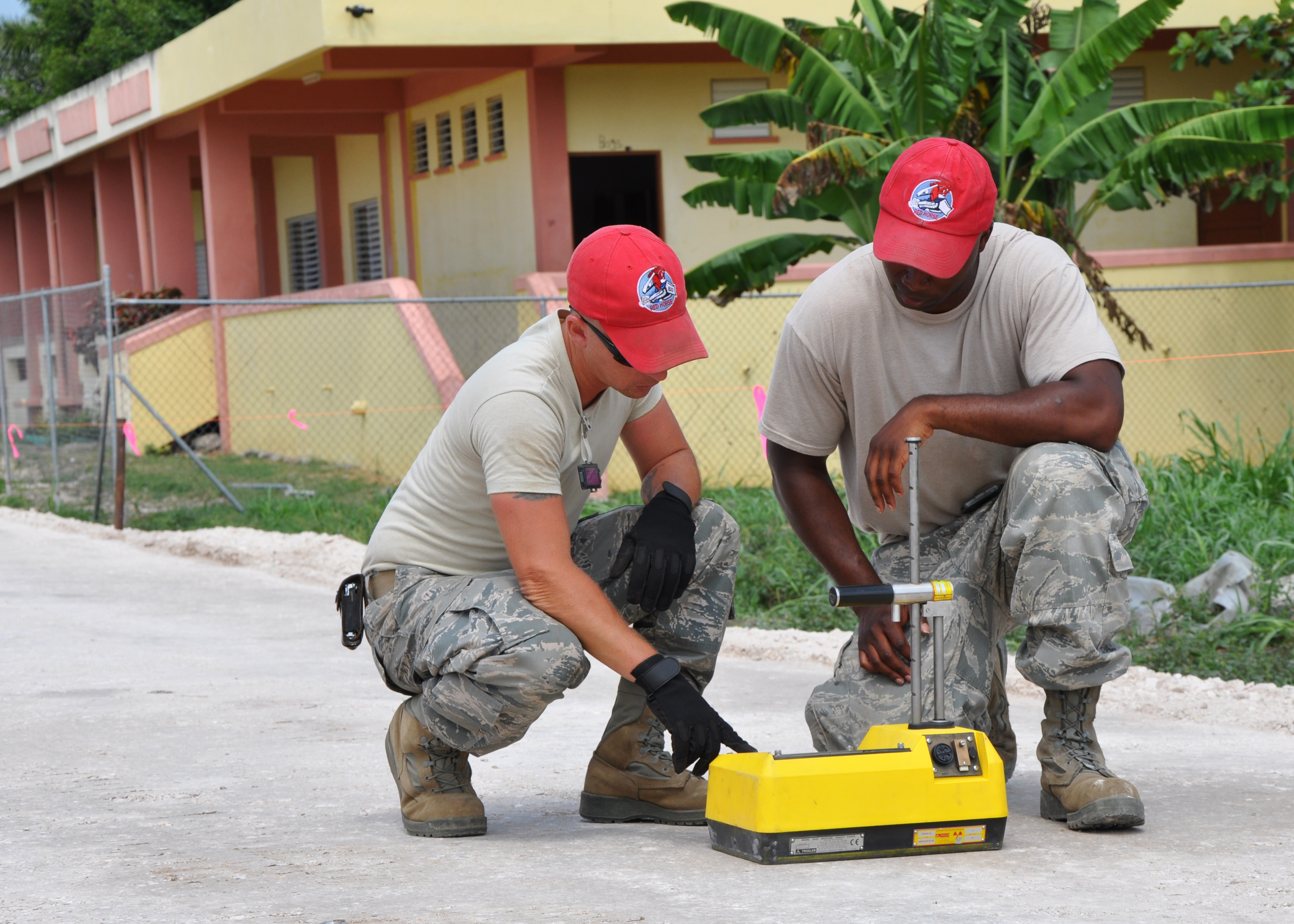
A density gauge being used to ensure proper compaction for the foundation of a school construction project.

Nuclear densitometry is a technique used in civil construction and the petroleum industry, as well as for mining and archaeology purposes, to measure the density and inner structure of a test material. The processes uses a nuclear density gauge, which consists of a radiation source that emits particles and a sensor that counts the received particles that are either reflected by the test material or pass through it. By calculating the percentage of particles that arrive at the sensor, the gauge can be calibrated to measure the density.

In geotechnical engineering, a nuclear densometer or soil density gauge is a field instrument used to determine the density of a compacted material. The device uses the interaction of gamma radiation with matter to measure density, either through direct transmission or the "backscatter" method. The device determines the density of material by counting the number of photons emitted by a radioactive source (cesium-137) that are read by the detector tubes in the gauge base. A 60-second time interval is typically used for the counting period.

== Sources ==
Different variants are used for different purposes. For density analysis of very shallow objects such as roads or walls, a gamma source emitter such as ^{137}Cesium is used to produce gamma radiation. These isotopes are effective in analyzing the top 10 in (25 cm) with high accuracy. ^{226}Radium is used for depths of 330 yd (300 m). Such instruments can help find caves or identify locations with lower density that would make tunnel construction hazardous.

== Modes of use ==
Nuclear density gauges are typically operated in one of two modes:

Direct transmission: The retractable rod is lowered into the material through a pre-drilled hole. The source emits radiation, which then interact with electrons in the material and lose energy and/or are redirected (scattered). Radiation that loses sufficient energy or is scattered away from the detector is not counted. The denser the material, the higher the probability of interaction and the lower the detector count. Therefore, the detector count is inversely proportional to material density. A calibration factor is used to relate the count to the actual density.

Backscatter: The retractable rod is lowered so that it is even with the detector but still within the instrument. The source emits radiation, which then interact with electrons in the material and lose energy and/or are redirected (scattered). Radiation that is scattered towards the detector is counted. The denser the material, the higher the probability that radiation will be redirected towards the detector. Therefore, the detector count is proportional to the density. A calibration factor is used to correlate the count to the actual density.

Many devices are built to measure both the density and moisture content of material. This is important to the civil construction industry specifically as both are essential to verifying suitable soil conditions to support structures, streets, highways, and airport runways.

== Uses ==
=== Ground compaction ===
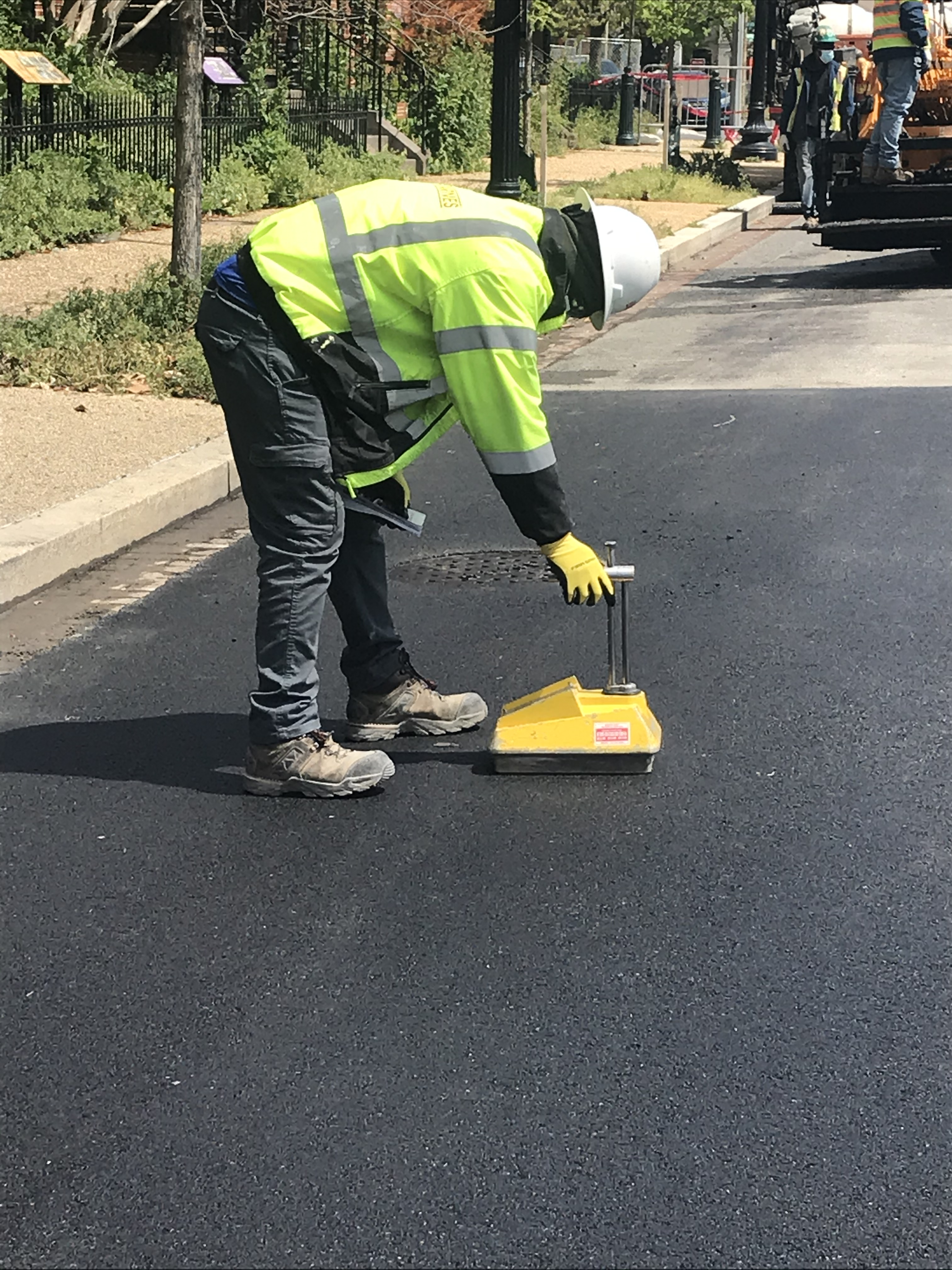
Asphalt Density Gauge

A nuclear densometer is used on a compacted base to establish its percentage of compaction. Before field tests are performed, the technician performs a calibration on the gauge which records the 'standard count' of the machine. Standard counts are the amount of radiation released by the two nuclear sources inside the machine, with no loss or leakage. This allows the machine to compare the amount of radiation released to the amount of radiation received. With the use of a 3/4" diameter rod a hole is created in the compacted base by hammering the rod into the base to produce a hole that the densometer's probe can be inserted into. The densometer is placed on top of the hole, and then the probe is inserted into the hole by unlocking the handle at the top of the probe. One source produces radiation that interacts with the atoms in the soil, and is then compared to the standard count, to calculate the density. The other source interacts with hydrogen atoms to calculate the percentage of water in the soil.

In direct transmission mode, the source extends through the base of the gauge into a predrilled hole, positioning the source at the desired depth. The testing procedure is analogous to burying a known quantity of radioactive material at a specific depth, and then using a Geiger counter at the ground surface to measure how effectively the soil's density blocks the penetration of gamma radiation through the soil. As the soil's density increases, less radiation can pass through it, owing to dispersion from collisions with electrons in the soil being tested.

Since the soil's moisture level is partly responsible for its in-place density, the gauge also contains a neutron moisture gauge consisting of an americium/beryllium high-energy neutron source and a thermal neutron detector. The high-energy neutrons are slowed when they collide with hydrogen atoms, and the detector then counts the "slowed" neutrons. This count is proportional to the soil's water content, since the hydrogen in this water (H_{2}O) is responsible for almost all the hydrogen found in most soils. The gauge calculates the moisture content, subtracts it from the soil's in-place (wet) density, and reports the soil's dry density.

=== Density of liquids in pipes ===
Nuclear density gauges can also be used to measure the density of a liquid in a pipe. If a source is mounted on one side of a pipe and a detector on the other, the amount of radiation seen at the detector is dependent upon the shielding provided by the liquid in the pipe. Tracerco pioneered the use of radiation to measure density in the 1950s and determined that the Beer–Lambert law also applied to radiation as well as optics. Gauges are normally calibrated using gas and a liquid of known density to find the unknowns in the equation. Once it has been calibrated and as long as the source detector alignment remains constant, it is possible to calculate the density of the liquid in the pipe. One factor is the half-life of the radioactive source (30 years for ^{137}Cs), which means that the system needs to be recalibrated at regular intervals. Modern systems incorporate correction for source decay.

=== Locating underground water ===
Another variant is to use a strong neutron source like ^{241}americium/beryllium to produce neutron radiation and then measure the energy of returning neutron scattering. As hydrogen characteristically slows down neutrons, the sensor can calculate the density of hydrogen — and find pockets of underground water, humidity up to a depth of several meters, moisture content, or asphalt content.

=== Testing separators ===
Neutron sources can also be used to assess the performance of a separator (oil production) in the same way. Gas, oil, water and sand all have different concentrations of hydrogen atoms which reflect different amounts of slow neutrons. This can be used to determine the interface levels within a separator by moving a head which contains an ^{241}AmBe neutron source and a slow neutron detector up and down it.

== See also ==
- Nuclear power
