= Ralph A. James =

American chemist (1920–1973)

Ralph Arthur James
- Born: September 23, 1920; Salt Lake City, Utah, US
- Died: February 24, 1973 (aged 52); Alamo, California, US
- Known for: Co-discovery of curium, americium
- Scientific career
- Fields: Chemistry

Ralph Arthur James (23 September 1920 in Salt Lake City, Utah – 24 February 1973 in Alamo, California) was an American chemist at the University of Chicago who co-discovered the elements curium (1944) and americium (1944–1945). Later he worked at UCLA and for the Lawrence Livermore laboratory in California. He also worked on niobium and nuclear spectroscopy.

== Scientific career ==
James was part of the Laboratory of Metallurgy, University of Chicago, the team directed by Glenn T. Seaborg. The laboratory had large amounts of plutonium (discovered in 1940–41) that was being produced at the Hanford Site to make nuclear weapons. This allowed them to discover two new elements, although the difficulties for study and isolation were great.

In 1944, Seaborg decided to extend the search to heavier elements, and instructed James and Leon O. Morgan to send samples of irradiated plutonium to Albert Ghiorso for analysis. By identifying characteristics of emitted alpha particles they found the new elements.

=== Discovery of curium ===
Curium (atomic number 96) was discovered in 1944 by Glenn T. Seaborg, James and Albert Ghiorso during World War II in the Chicago Metallurgical Laboratory, as part of the Manhattan Project, by bombarding plutonium with helium ions. It was named in honor of Pierre Curie and Marie Sklodowska Curie.

=== Discovery of americium ===
Similarly, americium (atomic number 95) was discovered in 1944–45 by Glenn T. Seaborg, James, Leon O. Morgan and Albert Ghiorso, working as part of the Manhattan Project. By bombarding plutonium neutrons in the 60-inch cyclotron at the University of California, Berkeley. The element is named after America, especially the United States of America, and because it is a homologous element of europium (atomic number 63), it is positioned right above it on periodic charts.

== Honors ==
- Ralph James became a member of the Guggenheim Foundation in 1955, for chemistry.

== Publications ==
- The New Element Curium (Atomic Number 96). Glenn T. Seaborg, Ralph A. James, & Albert Ghiorso. January 1948.
- The New Element Americium (Atomic Number 95).] Glenn T. Seaborg, Ralph A. James, & Leon O.Morgan. NNES PPR (National Nuclear Energy Series, Plutonium Project Record), Vol. 14 B The Transuranium Elements: Research Papers, Paper No. 22.1, McGraw-Hill Book Co., Inc., New York, 1949.
- L-Electron Capture and Alpha-Decay in Np235. Ralph A. James, Albert Ghiorso, Donald Orth. Radiation Laboratory, University of California, Berkeley. Phys. Rev. 85, 369 (1952).
- Excitation Functions of Proton-Induced Reactions of Nb93. Ralph A. James. Physical Review – January 1954. Vol 93, Number 2, p. 288-290.
- Proton Induced Reactions of Thorium—Fission Yield Curves. Howard A. Tewes and Ralph A. James. Department of Chemistry, University of California, Los Angeles. Phys. Rev. 88, 860 (1952).
- Cross Sections for Nuclear Reactions Involving Nuclear Isomers. Bruno Linder* and Ralph A. James. Department of Chemistry, UCLA, California. Phys. Rev. 114, 322–325 (1959).
- Isomeric States of Nd141 and Sm143. Ralph A. James and Carleton D. Bingham. Department of Chemistry, University of California, Los Angeles. Phys. Rev. 117, 810 (1960).
- Estimate of radiation dose to thyroid of the Rongelap children following the Bravo event. Lawrence Radiation Laboratory, 1964.
- Calculation of radioactive iodine concentrations in milk and human thyroid as a result of nuclear explosions. Ralph A. James. UCRL 7716. Nuclear Explosions - Peaceful Applications, UC-35. University of California, Lawrence Radiation Laboratory, 1964.
