= Leon O. Morgan =

American chemist

Leon Owen Morgan
- Born: 25 October 1919; Oklahoma City, USA
- Died: 29 July 2002 (Age 82); Austin, Texas
- Education: Oklahoma City University, University of Texas at Austin
- Known for: Americium
- Spouse: Mary Elizabeth "Betty" Boyd
- Children: 4
- Scientific career
- Fields: Nuclear Chemistry

Leon Owen "Tommy" Morgan Jr. (October 25, 1919 – July 29, 2002) was an American academic and Professor of Chemistry at the University of Texas at Austin. He co-discovered the chemical element americium along with Albert Ghiorso, Glenn T. Seaborg and Ralph A. James.

During World War II, he worked under Seaborg on plutonium chemistry in the Manhattan Project in Chicago and in 1944 on the discovery of transuranic elements by irradiating plutonium at the cyclotron in Berkeley.

== Early life and education ==
Morgan was born in Oklahoma City in 1919. He was the youngest son of Leon Owen Morgan Sr and Catherine J Reitermann. He graduated from Classen High School in 1937 and graduated summa cum laude from Oklahoma City University in 1941. He then entered the University of Texas at Austin, earning his master's degree in chemistry in 1942. The school would eventually name the Leon O. Morgan Graduate Fellowship in his honour.

== Early career ==
During World War II, Morgan worked on the Manhattan Project, aiming to develop the atomic bomb. He was assigned to the University of Chicago, where he joined the Nuclear Chemistry Metallurgy Research Group under Nobel Laureate Glenn T. Seaborg. There, he worked on the chemistry of plutonium processing, which led to his involvement in the isolation of curium and the discovery of americium in 1944-45. After the war, Morgan completed his PhD under Seaborg at the University of California, Berkeley, in 1947.

== Scientific career ==
=== Search for new elements ===
Morgan was part of the Laboratory of Metallurgy (LabMet) at the University of Chicago, directed by Glenn T. Seaborg. With sufficient plutonium available, Seaborg instructed chemists Ralph A. James and Leon O. Morgan to irradiate plutonium in the Berkeley cyclotron, sending samples to Chicago for analysis by Albert Ghiorso. They confirmed the presence of americium by identifying characteristic alpha particles emitted by the activated samples.

=== Discovery of americium ===
Americium was discovered in 1944 by Glenn T. Seaborg, Ralph A. James, Morgan, and Albert Ghiorso by bombarding plutonium-239, an isotope of plutonium, with high energy neutrons. This formed plutonium-240, which was itself bombarded with neutrons, turning into plutonium-241, which then decayed into americium-241 through beta decay. This was done at the University of Chicago's Metallurgical Laboratory, now known as Argonne National Laboratory. The element is named after the Americas, not the United States of America as is sometimes stated.

=== Academic career ===
In 1947, after completing his PhD, Morgan joined the Department of Chemistry at the University of Texas at Austin, where he retired as professor emeritus in 1993. He initiated a nuclear chemistry and radiochemistry program focusing on elements such as tungsten, rhenium, and osmium, and the study of electrochemical processes. His grad students included Harold M. Goff and Conrad C. Hinckley.

He directed the first-year chemistry program, taught various classes, and supervised many graduate students and postdoctoral fellows. In the mid-1950s, Morgan investigated nuclear magnetic resonance spectroscopy, contributing to the development of the Solomon-Bloembergen-Morgan (SBM) theory, which laid the groundwork for magnetic resonance imaging (MRI), a critical diagnostic tool in medicine.

He was chairman of the University’s Intercollegiate Athletics Council for Men, 1979-87, and served as a member of the Council from 1968-72 and again from 1988-89. Following his retirement from teaching, he served as President of the UT Austin Retired Faculty-Staff Association and as Chairman of the Advisory Committee to the UT Austin Faculty Center.

His later research focused on the dissolution of transition metal coordination complexes, emphasizing biological interest structures like the iron-porphyrin structures in hemoglobin and cytochrome c.

Morgan retired as professor emeritus in 1993.

== Other positions ==
Beyond his academic career, Morgan consulted with colleagues at the Los Alamos Scientific Laboratory in New Mexico and was an associate editor of the ACS Journal of Physical Chemistry, having been appointed to this position in 1964.

He was chairman of the University’s Intercollegiate Athletics Council for Men, 1979-87, and served as a member of the Council from 1968-72 and again from 1988-89. Following his retirement from teaching, he served as President of the UT Austin Retired Faculty-Staff Association and as Chairman of the Advisory Committee to the UT Austin Faculty Center.

== Personal life and death ==
While in graduate school he met his future wife Mary Elizabeth "Betty" Boyd (born 23 April 1921, Terrell, Kaufman County, died 13 Nov 2013, Austin, Texas). They married on December 27, 1942. After completing their Masters Degrees in 1943, they moved to Chicago where they worked on the Manhattan Project at the Metallurgical Laboratory at the University of Chicago.

They had four children: Joseph C. Morgan, Dr. A. Boyd Morgan, Dr. Robert O. Morgan and Mary Kay Morgan Muir. Morgan died on July 29, 2002, in Austin, at the age of 82. Both him and his wife were cremated.

== Publications ==
- 1950: Ghiorso A, James RA, Morgan LO, Seaborg GT. Preparation of transplutonium isotopes by neutron irradiation. Physical Review. 78: 472. DOI: 10.1103/Physrev.78.472
- 1956: Morgan LO, Nolle AW, Hull RL, Murphy J. Proton relaxation in solutions of chromium (III) complexes. The Journal of Chemical Physics. 25: 206-208.
- 1956: Morgan LO, Murphy J, Nolle AW. Proton spin relaxation in water-glycerin solutions of chromium (III) ions. The Journal of Chemical Physics. 24: 906-907.
- 1957: Nolle AW, Morgan LO. Frequency dependence of proton spin relaxation in aqueous solutions of paramagnetic ions. The Journal of Chemical Physics. 26: 642-648.
- 1959: Morgan LO, Murphy J, Cox PF. Proton spin relaxation in aqueous solutions of paramagnetic ions. III. Copper(II)-diamine complexes. Journal of the American Chemical Society. 81: 5043-5047.
- 1959: Morgan LO, Nolle AW. Proton spin relaxation in aqueous solutions of paramagnetic ions. II. Cr+++, Mn++, Ni++, Cu++, and Gd+++. The Journal of Chemical Physics. 31: 365-368.
- 1959: Cox PF, Morgan LO. Proton spin relaxation in aqueous solutions of paramagnetic ions. IV. Temperature dependence in solutions of copper(II)-ethylenediamine complexes. Journal of the American Chemical Society. 81: 6409-6412.
- 1961: Bloembergen N, Morgan LO. Proton relaxation times in paramagnetic solutions. Effects of electron spin relaxation. The Journal of Chemical Physics. 34: 842-850.
- 1963: Morgan LO. On hydration of gadolinium (III) ions in aqueous solution. The Journal of Chemical Physics. 38: 2788-2789.
- 1966: Hinckley CC, Morgan LO. Electron spin resonance linewidths of manganese (II) ions in concentrated aqueous solutions. The Journal of Chemical Physics. 44: 898-905.
- 1966: Garreti BB, Morgan LO. Electron spin relaxation in solvated manganese (II) ion solutions. The Journal of Chemical Physics. 44: 890-897.
- 1966: Zeltmann AH, Morgan LO. Nuclear Magnetic Resonance of Oxygen-17 and Chlorine-35 in Aqueous Hydrochloric Acid Solutions of Iron(III). The Journal of Physical Chemistry. 70: 2807-2813. DOI: 10.1021/j100881a016
- 1967: Alei M, Lewis WB, Denison AB, Morgan LO. Magnetic resonance studies on copper (II) complex ions in solution. III. NMR and EPR in concentrated ethylenediamine solutions. The Journal of Chemical Physics. 47: 1062-1070.
- 1968: Zeltmann AH, Matwiyoff NA, Morgan LO. Nuclear magnetic resonance of oxygen-17 and chlorine-35 in aqueous hydrochloric acid solutions of cobalt(II). I. Line shifts and relative abundances of solution species. Journal of Physical Chemistry. 72: 121-127.
- 1969: Zeltmann AH, Matwiyoff NA, Morgan LO. Nuclear magnetic resonance of oxygen-17 and chlorine-35 in aqueous hydrochloric acid solutions of cobalt (II). II. Relaxation and chemical exchange. Journal of Physical Chemistry. 73: 2689-2696.
- 1969: Garrett BB, Morgan LO. Erratum: Electron Spin Relaxation in Solvated Manganese (II) Ion Solutions. The Journal of Chemical Physics. 50: 3135-3136. DOI: 10.1063/1.1671533
- 1970: Zeltmann AH, Morgan LO. Ligand substitution processes in aqueous cobalt(II)-thiocyanate solutions. Nuclear magnetic resonances of oxygen-17 and nitrogen-14. Inorganic Chemistry. 9: 2522-2528.
- 1970: Hempel JC, Morgan LO, Lewis WB. Electron paramagnetic resonance of trans-disubstituted bis(ethylenediamine)chromium(III) complexes in frozen solutions. Inorganic Chemistry. 9: 2064-2072.
- 1970: Matwiyoff NA, Strouse CE, Morgan LO. Carbon-13 and oxygen-17 nuclear magnetic resonance studies of the structure of the nickel(II)-ethylenediaminetetraacetate complexes in aqueous solution. Journal of the American Chemical Society. 92: 5222-5224. DOI: 10.1021/Ja00720A040
- 1975: Fuentes R, Morgan LO, Matwiyoff NA. Fourier transform carbon-13 nuclear magnetic resonance of aqueous nickel(II)-acetic acid solutions. I. Equilibrium quotients from relative abundances of solution species. Inorganic Chemistry. 14: 1837-1840.
- 1976: Goff H, Morgan LO. Magnetic properties of iron(III) porphyrin dimers in aqueous solution. Inorganic Chemistry. 15: 3180-3181.
- 1976: Morgan LO, Eakin RT, Vergamimi PJ, Matwiyoff NA. Carbon-13 nuclear magnetic resonance of heme carbonyls. Cytochrome c and carboxymethyl derivatives of cytochrome c. Biochemistry. 15: 2203-7. PMID 6042
- 1978: Goff HM, Morgan LO. Carbon-13 and proton nuclear magnetic resonance spectroscopy of water-soluble porphyrins and metalloporphyrins. Bioinorganic Chemistry. 9: 61-79. PMID 687673 DOI: 10.1016/S0006-3061(00)82006-2
