= Americium(III) fluoride =

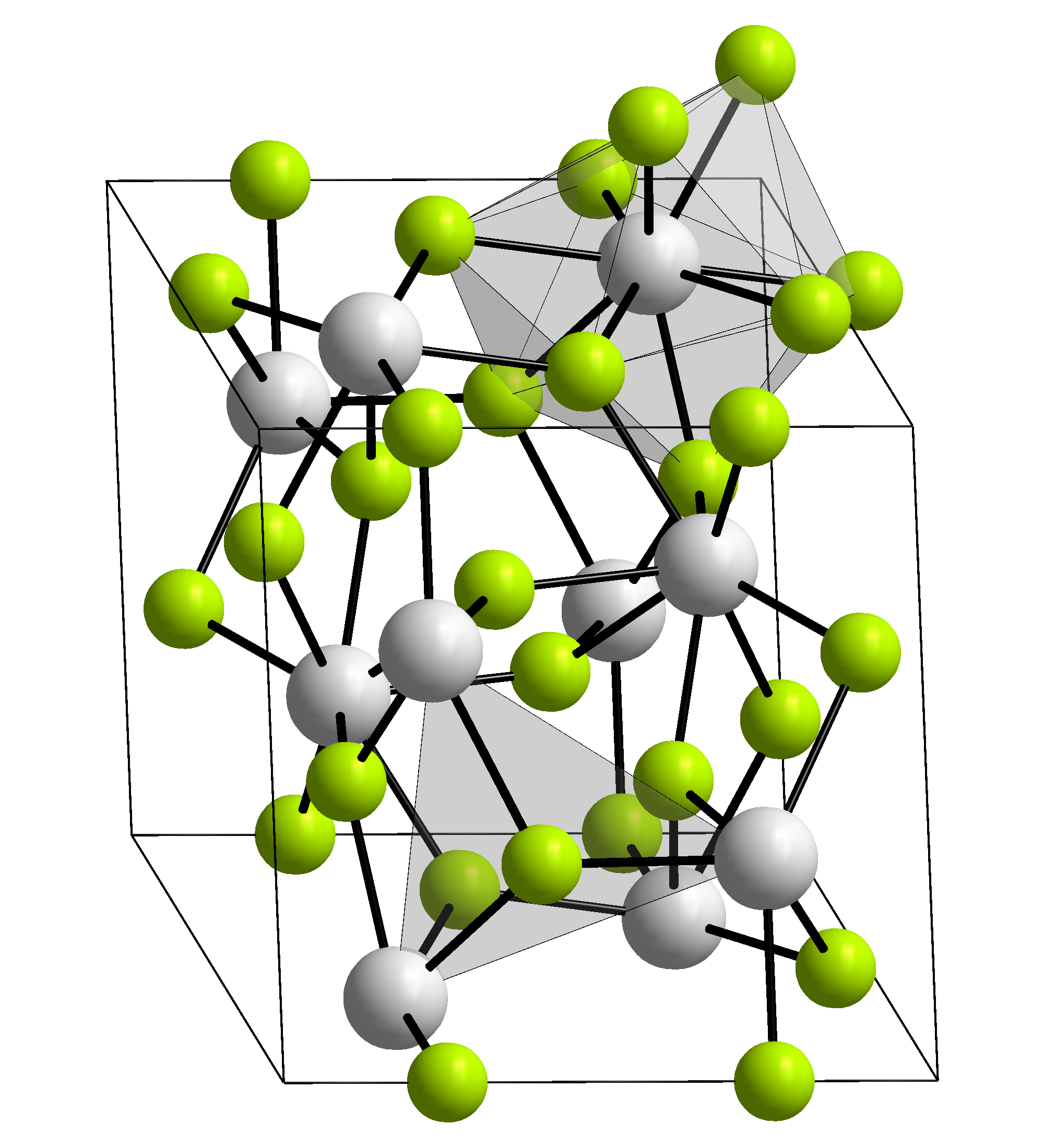
- Crystal structure

Names
- IUPAC name Americium(III) fluoride
- Other names Americium trifluoride

Identifiers
CAS Number	13708-80-0
3D model (JSmol)	Interactive image
ChemSpider	57569004
PubChem CID	21493614
CompTox Dashboard (EPA)	DTXSID10614859
- InChI: InChI=1S/Am.3FH/h;3*1H/q+3;;;/p-3
- SMILES: F[Am](F)F

Properties
Chemical formula	AmF_{3}
Molar mass	300 g/mol
Appearance	pink, crystalline solid
Density	9.53 g/cm^{3}
Melting point	1,393 °C (2,539 °F; 1,666 K)

Structure
Crystal structure	Rhombohedral, hR24
Space group	P3̅c1, No. 165
Lattice constant	a = 0.7068 nm, c = 0.7246 nm
Lattice volume (V)	0.31349
Formula units (Z)	6

Related compounds
Other anions	Americium(III) chloride Americium(III) bromide Americium(III) iodide
Other cations	Plutonium(III) fluoride Curium(III) fluoride Europium(III) fluoride
Related americium fluorides	Americium(IV) fluoride
- Except where otherwise noted, data are given for materials in their standard state (at 25 °C [77 °F], 100 kPa). Infobox references

Americium(III) fluoride or americium trifluoride is the chemical compound composed of americium and fluorine with the formula AmF_{3}. It is a water insoluble, pink salt.
