= Americium(III) chloride =

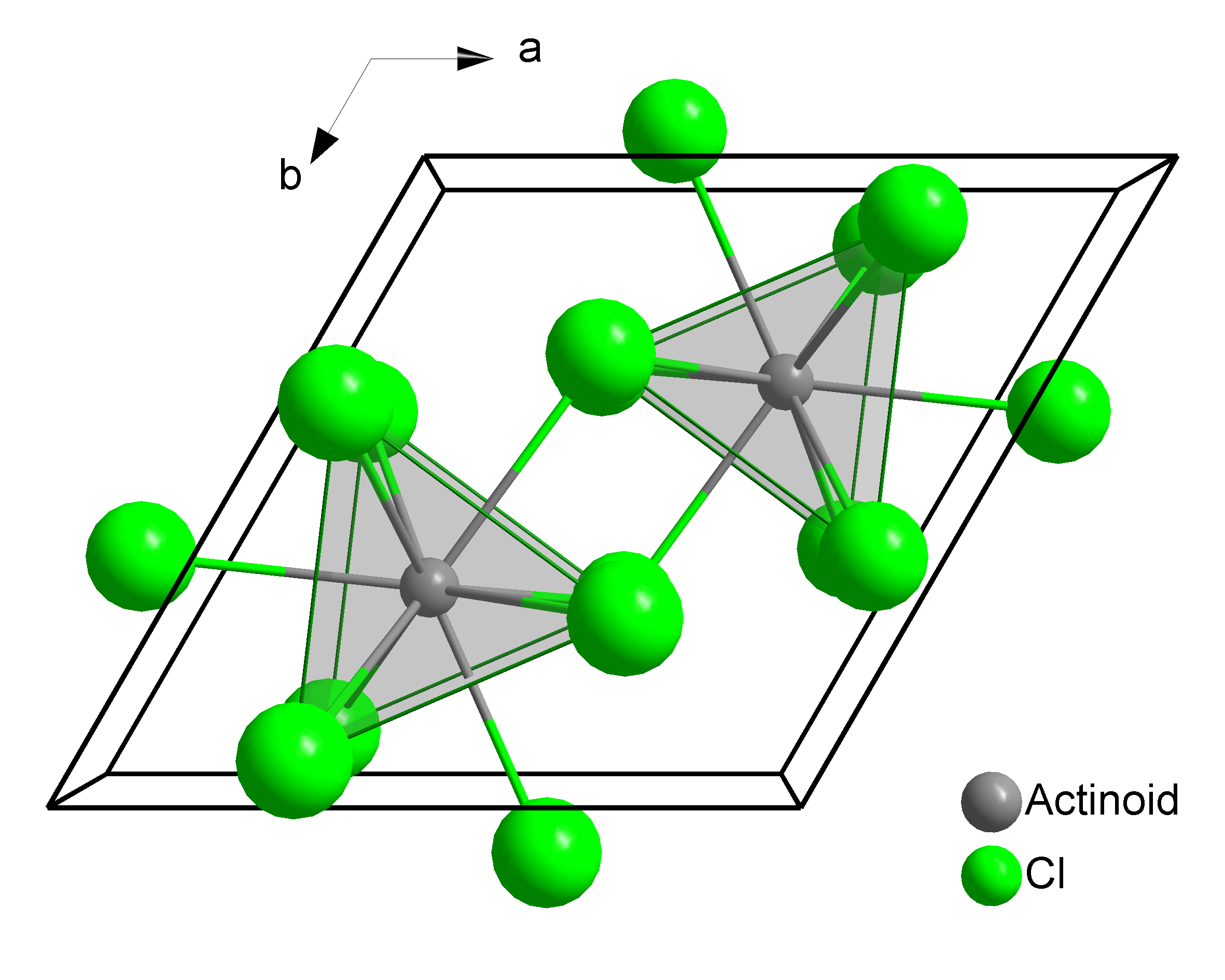
- Unit cell, ball and stick model of americium(III) chloride with a legend

Names
- IUPAC name Americium(III) chloride
- Systematic IUPAC name Americium(3+) chloride
- Other names Americium chloride Americium trichloride

Identifiers
| CAS Number | 13464-46-5 |
| 3D model (JSmol) | Interactive image |
| ChemSpider | 15964177 |
| PubChem CID | 17815325 |
- InChI: InChI=1S/Am.3ClH/h;3*1H/q+3;;;/p-3 Key: GQKWPBIZTINWCF-UHFFFAOYSA-K
- SMILES: [Cl-].[Cl-].[Cl-].[Am+3]

Properties
| Chemical formula | AmCl_{3} |
| Molar mass | 349 g·mol^{−1} |
| Appearance | Light red, opaque crystals |
| Density | 5.87 g cm^{−3} |
| Melting point | 715 °C (1,319 °F; 988 K) |
| Boiling point | 850 °C (1,560 °F; 1,120 K) |

Structure
| Crystal structure | hexagonal (UCl_{3} type), hP8 |
| Space group | P6_{3}/m, No. 176 |
| Coordination geometry | Tricapped trigonal prismatic (nine-coordinate) |

Related compounds
| Other anions | Americium(III) fluoride Americium(III) bromide Americium(III) iodide |
| Other cations | Plutonium(III) chloride Curium(III) chloride Europium(III) chloride |
| Related americium chlorides | Americium(II) chloride |
- Except where otherwise noted, data are given for materials in their standard state (at 25 °C [77 °F], 100 kPa). verify (what is ?) Infobox references

Americium(III) chloride or americium trichloride is the chemical compound composed of americium and chlorine with the formula AmCl_{3}. This salt forms pink hexagonal crystals. In the solid state each americium atom has nine chlorine atoms as near neighbours, at approximately the same distance, in a tricapped trigonal prismatic configuration.

The hexahydrate has a monocline crystal structure with: a = 970.2 pm, b = 656.7 pm and c = 800.9 pm; β = 93° 37'; space group: P2/n.

== Reactions ==
An americium(III) chloride electrorefining method has been investigated to separate mixtures of actinides, since the standard Gibbs free energy of formation of americium(III) chloride is much different than the rest of the actinide chlorides. This can be used to remove americium from plutonium by melting the crude mixture together with salts such as sodium chloride.
