= Tracerco =

- Type: Subsidiary
- Industry: Oil and Gas
- Founded: in 1958
- Headquarters: Billingham, England, UK
- Products: Instrumentation and Diagnostic Services
- Number of employees: 400
- Parent: Sullivan Street Partners
- Website: https://www.Tracerco.com

Tracerco is an oil and gas services business owned by London based investment firm Sullivan Street Partners.

== History ==
In 1958, Imperial Chemical Industries (ICI) established a division to research the use of ionizing radiation within chemical processes. They found it was not possible to use it as a catalyst, but found it could be used to assess/diagnose within the chemical process, typically ahead of plant turnarounds. In the 1960s the division was named Physics and Radioisotope Services, performing flow studies, heat exchanger leakage tests and column scans on a chemical plant in the UK. To support the work being done in hazardous areas, a range of Intrinsically safe radiation monitors were developed. Most of this early work was later recorded by Peter Jackson.

In 1967, the first nuclear gauge was developed to measure the level within a vessel at Billingham chemical works. The Specialist Measurement Instruments section was established with a variety of level, trip, and Nuclear density gauges, commonly used in applications such as slug catchers and separation vessels.

A General Atomics Triga 250 kW Mark 1 nuclear reactor was operated from 1971 to 1998. This was used to create short half-life radioisotopes for use in chemical plant diagnostics, sample analysis and forensic work.

In the 1970s, the business supported the development of the North Sea oil industry, selling a range of services and nucleonic gauges. In the 1980s, bases were established in Aberdeen, Scotland, Houston, Texas, Sarnia, Ontario and Edmonton, Alberta. Subsea gauges were developed for grout monitoring. A subsea nucleonic gauge level system was developed for Texaco Highlander Slug Catcher Tartan tieback, as well as techniques to assess and diagnose fluid catalytic cracking units.

In the 1990s, a range of Flooded Member Inspection and Pipeline Inspection Gauge (PIG) Tracking services were used in pipeline pigging campaigns. Tracer technologies were developed to allow oil companies to characterize fluid flow in oil and gas reservoirs and inside production wells.

The Tracerco Profiler entered the market in 2000. This Nuclear density gauge allows customers to see into their separator. This product received the Queen's Award for Innovation in 2003. In 2007, this instrument was deployed on Statoil's Tordis module, the world's first subsea oil and gas production facility.

Imperial Chemical Industries sold the group to Johnson Matthey in 2002.

The 2000s saw international expansion once again when Tracerco bought the Process Diagnostics division of QuestTruTec in 2006 to become the largest supplier of nucleonic diagnostic services currently in operation. Regional expansion then followed with offices opening in Perth, Australia, Baku, Azerbaijan and Abu Dhabi.

In 2009, Tracerco announced the acquisition of Belgium-based Process Vision Services (PVS). The acquisition facilitated the provision of Tracerco's more extensive range of process tracing and characterization technologies amongst clients throughout the refining and petrochemical industry in Europe and North Africa.

Also in 2009, Tracerco was awarded its third Queen's Award for Enterprise. This was for the innovation of its radiation monitoring instruments that are certified with intrinsic safety.

Discovery, the world's first subsea technology to provide medical grade CT scan information for pipeline inspection, was launched to the world's oil and gas industry in 2013. Discovery can measure pipe wall thickness through any type of pipeline coating to allow operators to make decisions about the short, medium and long-term future of a subsea pipeline.

== Business Operations ==
The company has 8 business areas:

- Instrumentation to provide Nucleonic measurement solutions, including level, density and interface measurement, which are certified for installation in hazardous areas and subsea.
- Process Diagnostics to diagnose production problems using measurement technology.
- Subsea Technologies to monitor flow assurance and the integrity of subsea assets.
- Radiation Monitors to measure radiation dose rate or characterize process and environmental contaminants.
- Radiation Protection Advice and Radiation Protection Supervisor Training to promote client operational safety and compliance with national and international Radiological legislation.
- Reservoir Characterization to optimize the recovery of hydrocarbons from both new and mature reservoirs.
- Analytical Services including standard and customized diagnostics.
- Fuel Security provides a range of unique covert molecular markers, which are tailored to suit the application.

== See also ==
- List of oilfield service companies
