= Americium(III) iodide =

Names
- IUPAC name Americium(III) iodide
- Other names Americium triiodide

Identifiers
CAS Number	13813-47-3
3D model (JSmol)	Interactive image
- InChI: InChI=1S/Am.3HI/h;3*1H/q+3;;;/p-3 Key: KZIHWWKUCWPQNZ-UHFFFAOYSA-K
- SMILES: [I-].[I-].[I-].[Am+3]

Properties
Chemical formula	AmI_{3}
Molar mass	624 g·mol^{−1}

Related compounds
Other anions	Americium(III) fluoride Americium(III) chloride Americium(III) bromide
- Except where otherwise noted, data are given for materials in their standard state (at 25 °C [77 °F], 100 kPa). Infobox references

Americium(III) iodide or americium triiodide is the chemical compound, a salt composed of americium and iodine with the formula AmI_{3}.

== Preparation ==
Americium(III) iodide can be prepared by reacting americium(III) chloride with ammonium iodide:

AmCl_{3} + 3 NH_{4}I → AmI_{3} + 3NH_{4}Cl

== Properties ==
Americium(III) iodide takes the form of yellow crystals. The crystal form is orthorhombic. It melts around 960 °C. The density is 6.9 g/cm^{3}. The compound consists of Am^{3+} and I^{−} ions. It crystallizes in the trigonal crystal system in the space group R3̅ (space group no. 148) with the lattice parameters a = 742 pm and c = 2055 pm and six formula units per unit cell. Its crystal structure is isotypic with bismuth(III) iodide.
