= Curium(III) bromide =

Chemical compound

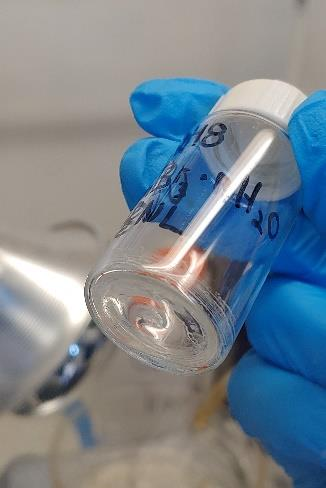

Names
- Other names: Curium tribromide; Curium bromide

Identifiers
| CAS Number | 14890-42-7 |
| 3D model (JSmol) | Interactive image |
| ChemSpider | 28548255 |
| PubChem CID | 185560 |
- InChI: InChI=1S/3BrH.Cm/h3*1H;/p-3 Key: HKCWOGXVUZTSCB-UHFFFAOYSA-K
- SMILES: [Br-].[Br-].[Br-].[Cm]

Properties
| Chemical formula | CmBr_{3} |
| Molar mass | 486.782 g/mol |
| Appearance | White or pale yellow green solid |
| Density | 6.87 g·cm^{−3} |
| Boiling point | 625 °C (1,157 °F; 898 K) |

Structure
| Coordination geometry | Orthorhombic |
- Except where otherwise noted, data are given for materials in their standard state (at 25 °C [77 °F], 100 kPa). Infobox references

Curium(III) bromide is the bromide salt of curium. It has an orthorhombic crystal structure.

== Preparation ==
Curium bromide can be produced by reacting curium chloride and ammonium bromide in a hydrogen atmosphere at 400–450 °C.

CmCl_{3} + 3NH_{4}Br → CmBr_{3} + 3 NH_{4}Cl

It can also be produced by reacting curium(III) oxide and hydrobromic acid at 600 °C.

== Properties ==
Curium bromide is an ionic compound composed of Cm^{3+} and Br^{−}, appearing as a colorless solid. It is orthorhombic, with space group Cmcm (No. 63) and lattice parameters a = 405 pm, b = 1266 pm and c = 912 pm. Its crystal structure is isostructural with plutonium(III) bromide.
