= Americium(II) iodide =

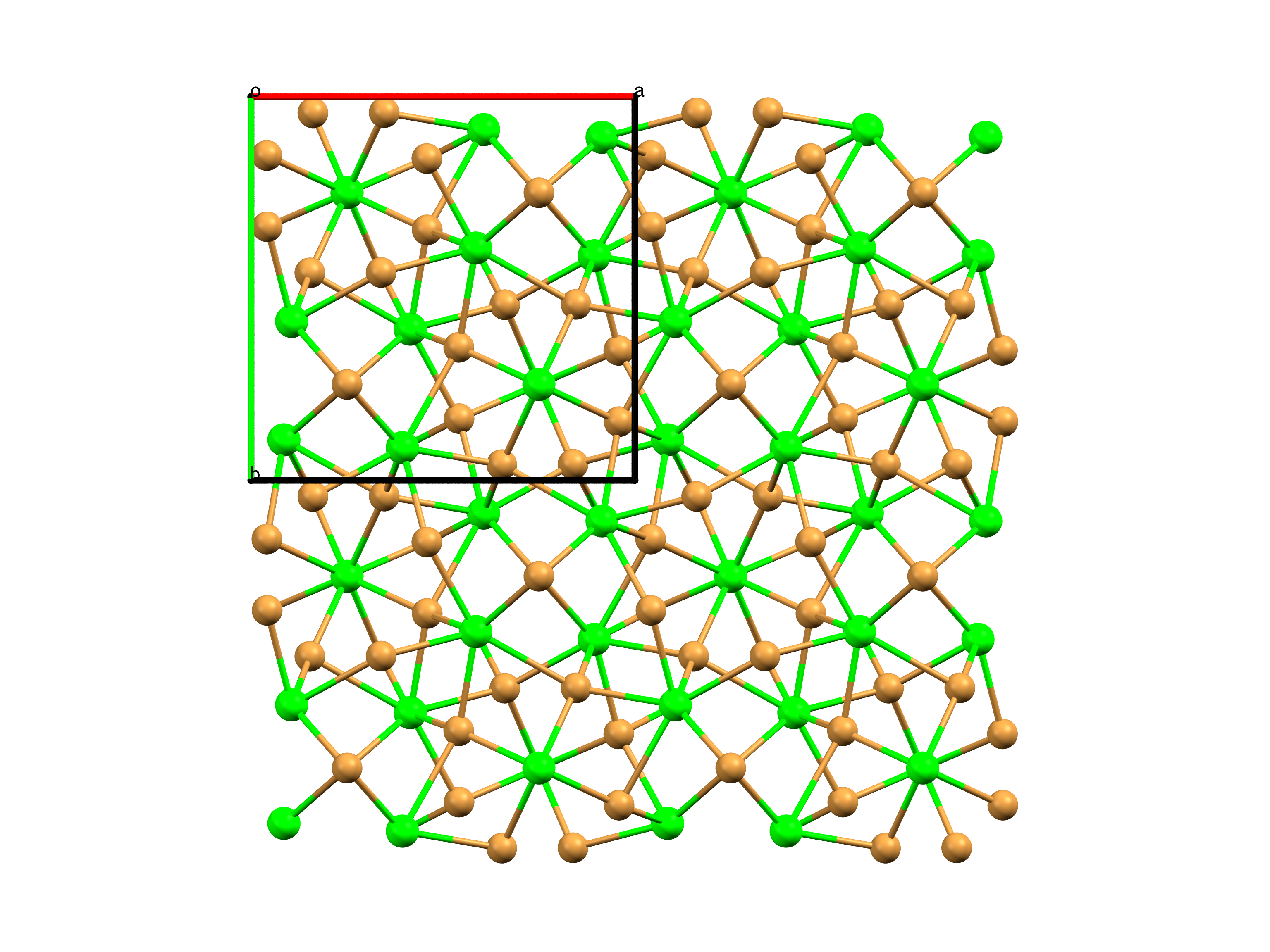

Names
- IUPAC name Americium(II) iodide
- Other names Americium diiodide

Identifiers
CAS Number	38150-40-2
3D model (JSmol)	Interactive image
ChemSpider	129558166
- InChI: InChI=1S/Am.2HI/h;2*1H/q+2;;/p-2 Key: BEKYCNWSCXLCSQ-UHFFFAOYSA-L
- SMILES: [I-].[I-].[Am+2]

Properties
Chemical formula	AmI_{2}
Molar mass	497 g·mol^{−1}
Appearance	black solid
Density	6.60 g/cm^{3}
- Except where otherwise noted, data are given for materials in their standard state (at 25 °C [77 °F], 100 kPa). Infobox references

Americium(II) iodide is the inorganic compound with the formula AmI_{2}. It is a black solid which crystallizes in the same motif as strontium bromide.
