= Americium(IV) fluoride =

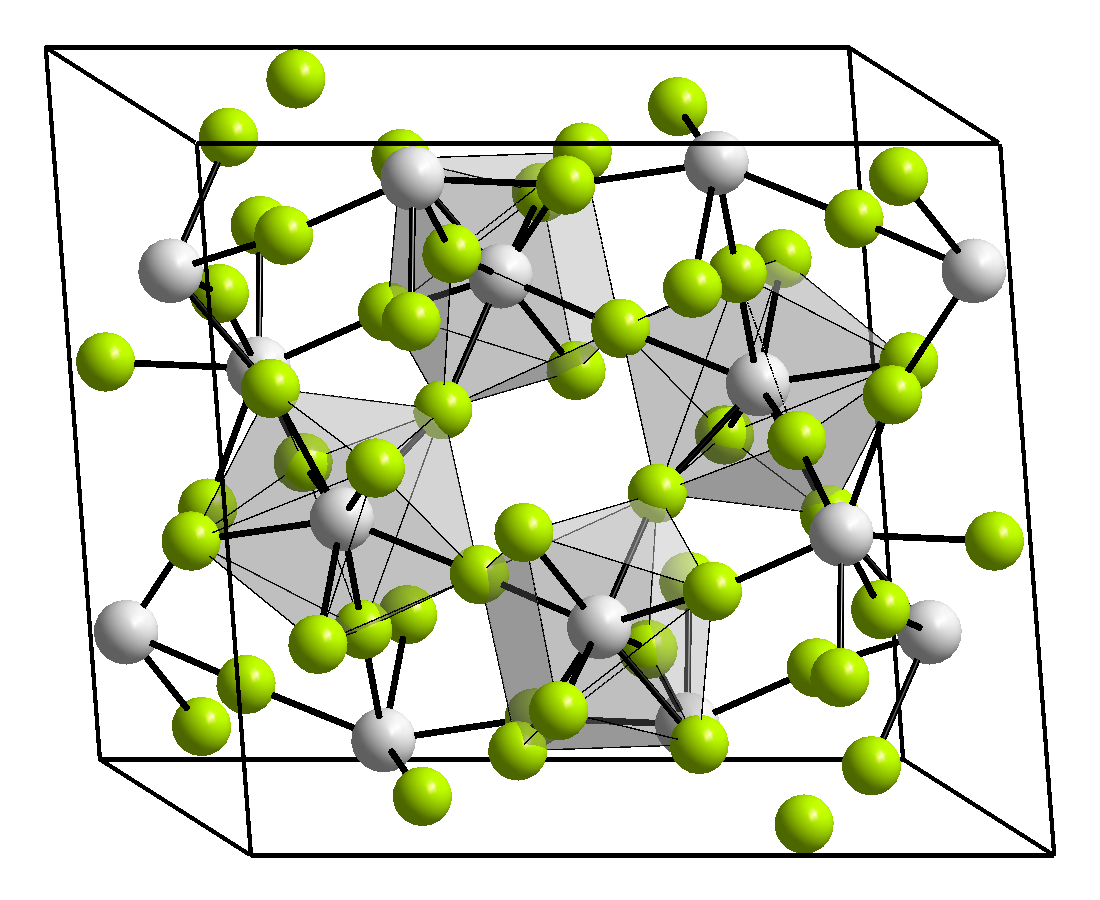

Names
- IUPAC name Americium(IV) fluoride
- Other names Americium tetrafluoride

Identifiers
CAS Number	15947-41-8
3D model (JSmol)	Interactive image
ChemSpider	67157337
PubChem CID	20504111
CompTox Dashboard (EPA)	DTXSID501046454
- InChI: InChI=1S/Am.4FH/h;4*1H/q+4;;;;/p-4 Key: QFBBQHPDWGVACX-UHFFFAOYSA-J
- SMILES: [F-].[F-].[F-].[F-].[Am+4]

Properties
Chemical formula	AmF_{4}
Molar mass	319 g·mol^{−1}
Appearance	tan solid
- Except where otherwise noted, data are given for materials in their standard state (at 25 °C [77 °F], 100 kPa). Infobox references

Americium(IV) fluoride is the inorganic compound with the formula AmF_{4}. It is a tan solid. In terms of its structure, solid AmF_{4} features 8-coordinate Am centers interconnected by doubly bridging fluoride ligands.
