= Plutonium Finishing Plant =

Former industrial facility in Washington state, US

Coordinates: 46°33′02″N 119°37′59″W

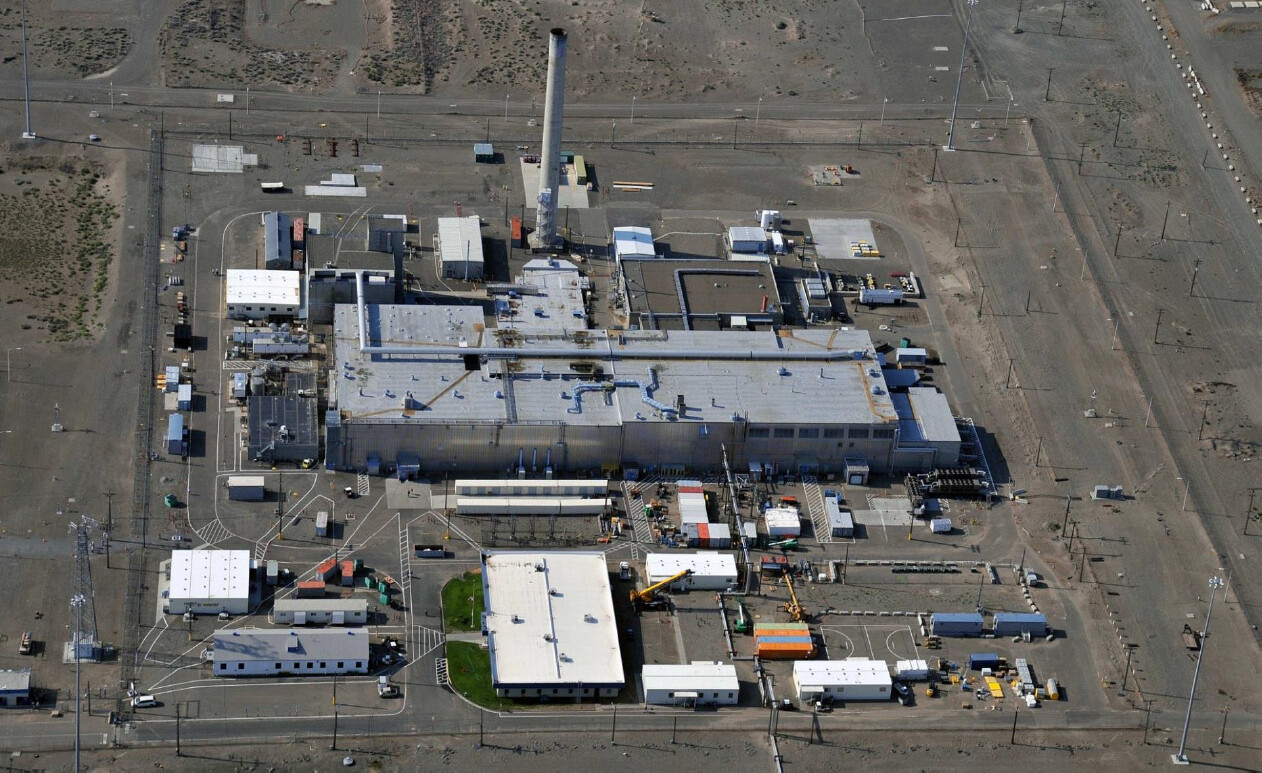
Plutonium Finishing Plant in 2012

The Plutonium Finishing Plant, also known as the Z Plant, was part of the Hanford Site plutonium production complex in Washington state. During World War II, Hanford produced plutonium nitrate (Pu(NO_{3})_{2}), which was shipped to the Manhattan Project's Los Alamos Laboratory, where it was turned into metallic plutonium and made into pits for nuclear weapons. After the war ended, the Los Alamos Laboratory moved to divest itself of production activities in order to devote itself to research. The Plutonium Finishing Plant was built at Hanford to carry out the purification and reduction of the plutonium to metallic form, known as "buttons", and then perform the casting, grinding, and lathing of the plutonium to turn it into pits.

The plant operated from 1949 to 1989. In 1953, it began shipping plutonium buttons to the new Rocky Flats Plant in Colorado, which fabricated pits. Plutonium production peaked in 1965, when 4,500 kilograms was produced. Between 1957 and 1961, nine types of pits were produced at Hanford. Pit production ended in 1965, when the Atomic Energy Commission announced that henceforth this work would be undertaken at the Rocky Flats Site. As demand for weapons-grade plutonium declined after 1964, the Plutonium Finishing Plant began producing mixed plutonium-oxide uranium-oxide (MOX) fuel for Hanford's Fast Flux Test Facility and reactor-grade plutonium.

Plutonium was valuable, and reducing waste saved landfill dispatches and preserved the long-term radiological safety of the area by not burying the highly contaminated waste. The Plutonium Finishing Plant reclaimed solid waste in its RECUPLEX facility, combustible waste in the 232-Z Incinerator, and liquid waste in the 242-Z Waste Treatment Facility. A multi-purpose Plutonium Reclamation Facility opened in 1964. A serious accident at the 242-Z Waste Treatment Facility occurred in 1976, when the contents of a glovebox containing americium and plutonium exploded, seriously injuring an operator, Harold McCluskey. This accident prompted a series of reviews and evaluations that led to the 1978 Department of Energy decision to close most of the Plutonium Finishing Plant's facilities. Before the plant could be demolished, approximately 18 metric tons of plutonium-bearing material was stabilized between 1996 and 2004. Legacy plutonium from plant systems was removed by 2005, and all weapons-grade plutonium was shipped to the Savannah River Site by 2009. Demolition work on the plant began in 2017 and was completed in 2021.

== Background ==
During World War II, the Manhattan Project built the Hanford Engineer Works (HEW) to produce plutonium for use in atomic bombs. At the HEW, three nuclear reactors bred plutonium by irradiating uranium. The irradiated uranium slugs were sent to three radiochemical separation plants, where the plutonium was separated from uranium and fission product using the bismuth-phosphate process. The plutonium was then delivered to the 231-Z Plutonium Isolation Building in the form of 8-U.S.-gallon (30 L) batches of plutonium nitrate (Pu(NO_{3})_{2}) in solution. This was further purified with hydrogen peroxide (H_{2}O_{2}) to separate the plutonium nitrate from its carrier and create what was called "AT solution". This was dried out, packaged in containers, and shipped to the Manhattan Project's Los Alamos Laboratory, where it was made into metallic plutonium and then formed into hemispheres for use in nuclear weapons.

After the war ended, the Manhattan District began considering enhancements to the production processes. At the same time, there was a desire to relieve the Los Alamos Laboratory of engineering and production responsibilities. The new director of the Los Alamos Laboratory, Norris Bradbury, hoped to devote the site exclusively to research, but its CMR (Chemistry and Metallurgy Research) Division was fully occupied producing components and materials for nuclear weapons. The new operator of the HEW, General Electric, was asked to design a new facility that would handle the rest of the plutonium finishing process. This involved the conversion of plutonium nitrate to plutonium oxalate (Pu(C_{2}O_{4})_{2}, then plutonium dioxide (PuO_{2}), and finally into metallic plutonium suitable for use in weapons and safer to transport long distances to the weapons assembly facilities.

On 1 January 1947, the Hanford Site, along with the other nuclear weapons production facilities, passed to the control of the newly established Atomic Energy Commission (AEC). The AEC embarked on a program of expanding the facilities in response to the tensions of the Cold War. This included accelerating the design and construction of the proposed Plutonium Finishing Plant.

== Design and construction ==
In December 1946, a representative from General Electric visited the plutonium finishing and fabricating facility at the Defense Production (DP) West Building at the Los Alamos Laboratory to study its operation. Company representatives paid Los Alamos a second visit in the spring of 1947, and a design feasibility report was issued in July. The design of the Plutonium Finishing Plant was based on it, but incorporated several improvements. At Los Alamos, the operators manipulated the plutonium using rubber gloves inside a glovebox, but to cater for the greater volume of plutonium to be processed and consequent higher safety standards, the design called for Part I of the operation, the purification and reduction of the plutonium to metallic form, to be carried out by a mechanized process. Part II of the process would be casting, grinding, and lathing the plutonium into pits.

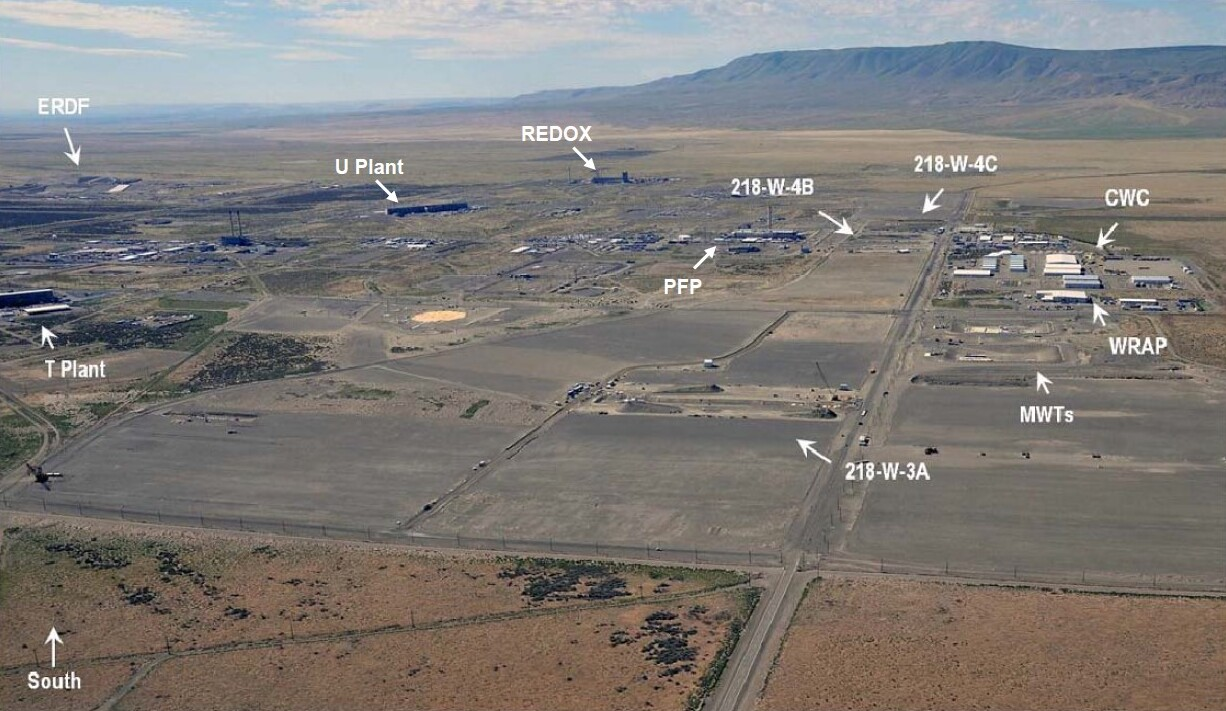
200 West Area looking south towards Rattlesnake Mountain. The Plutonium Finishing Plant is marked as PFP.

In August 1947, General Electric recommended that the Plutonium Finishing Plant be located within the fence of the 231-Z Plutonium Isolation Building, where it could use the existing boiler, water filtration, electricity, telephone, warehouse, road, and guard facilities. These all had to be expanded and extended to accommodate the new facility, but this was cheaper than building new ones. Plans initially called for Part I to be carried out in one building (234) and Part II in another (235), but in November General Electric decided to place them both in one building (which became 234-5Z) so the plutonium would be confined in gloveboxes throughout the finishing process.

Another deviation from the original design was the substitution of a manual process for a mechanized one. The facility was originally scheduled to open in late 1949, but in February 1948 the AEC communicated that it wanted the facility operational by 1 January 1949. In order to meet this deadline, General Electric decided to implement an interim rubber glove (RG) line akin to that used at Los Alamos, while continuing work on a remote, mechanized (RM) line.

Construction commenced in June 1948, when the concrete foundations and footings were poured. Work was also carried out on a new railroad spur and an extension to the 284-W Boiler House. Works involved 4,670 feet (1,420 m) of telephone lines, about 6,700 feet (2,000 m) of steam lines, 1,211 feet (369 m) of underground water pipes, and 26,000 feet (7,900 m) of air ducts. There was also a 20,000-US-gallon (76,000 L) septic tank and 380 square yards (320 m^{2}) of gravel roadway. For security reasons, instrumentation earmarked for the Plutonium Finishing Plant was stored in the warehouse in White Bluffs. Tests were conducted in gloveboxes in the 231-Z Building to establish procedures to be used in the new facility, using Karo syrup instead of AT solution.

Layout of the Plutonium Finishing Plant

By the scheduled start-up date of 1 January 1949, work on the 234-5Z Building was only 55 percent complete. Ten of the thirty process gloveboxes had been installed, and the first group of operations personnel were being trained. The start-up date was pushed back to 1 March. A 16-day strike by electrical workers in March and April further delayed completion. The building was handed over between 29 April and 6 May, and a full complement of 27 operators were trained by the middle of the month. Test runs were conducted to verify the equipment and procedures.

As built, the 234-5Z Building was 500 feet (150 m) long and 180 feet (55 m) wide. It had a steel frame surrounded by aluminum sheeting with rock wool insulation and 16-gauge steels. The floors of the two stories were concrete slabs. Some of the interior walls were reinforced concrete. The first floor contained the processing line, an analytical laboratory, and storage vaults for the plutonium. The second floor contained changing rooms, locker rooms, a lunch room, a conference room, and offices. Hanford personnel called it the Z Plant, because it was the last step in the production process.

== Operations ==
The Plutonium Finishing Plant commenced production operations on 5 July 1949. The RG line consisted of 28 gloveboxes operated by three shifts of operators who worked Monday to Friday. Training was not yet complete and the equipment was not fully functional. Negative air pressure was supposed to prevent airborne contamination, but samples taken in the processing area and the analytical laboratory were high enough to compel the operators to wear gas masks. Plutonium production fell short of the targets set by the AEC. On 24 October, the AEC called for increased production on the RG line, and authorized construction of a second RM line, although the first was still not operational. The two would become known as the RMA and RMB lines.

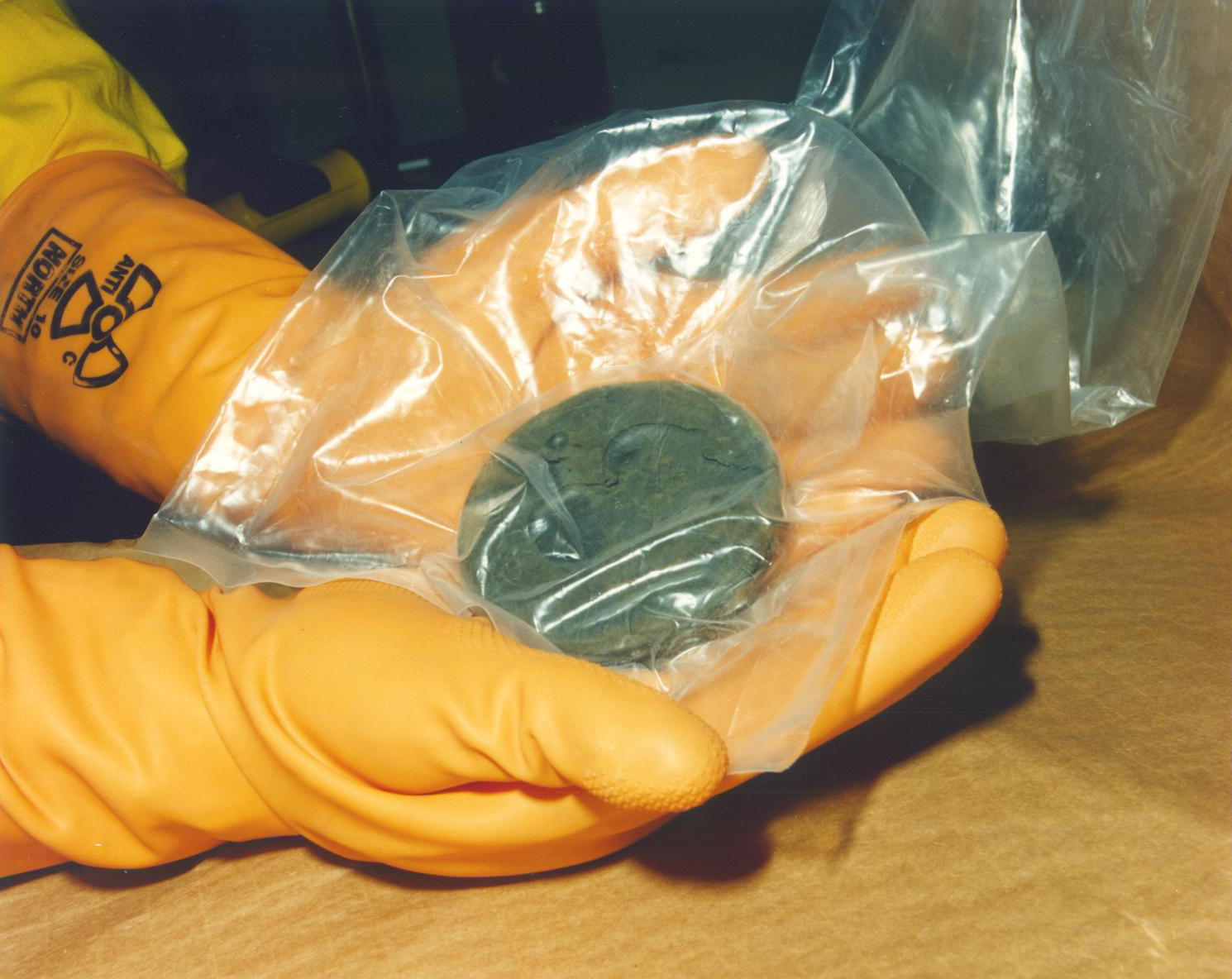
A plutonium button

Although the RMA line was intended to commence operations in 1951, the start up was delayed by an AEC requirement to produce a different model pit, and operations did not commence until 18 March 1952. The RMA line included 30 stainless steel gloveboxes, 30 control desks, 10 control cubicles, 24 instrument panels, 9 resistance furnaces, 5 induction furnaces, and a 100-foot (30 m) conveyor belt. The RMA line was soon out-producing the RG line, and, in 1953, RG line modernization was abandoned in favor of improvements to the RMA line.

The RMB line began shakedown tests on 17 May 1952, but due to improvement in the RMA line, the RMB line became obsolete before it was completed, and it never processed any plutonium. A third RM line (RMC) was authorized in 1957, and workers removed the RMB line when they installed the RMC line, which became operational in October 1960. In the early months of 1953, the RG line handled only 5 to 6 percent of the plutonium nitrate sent to the Plutonium Finishing Plant, and produced no pits. In 1955, the RG line equipment was removed and buried. The space where the RG and RMB lines had stood was used by the RMC line, which cost almost $1.9 million (equivalent to $20.15 in 2024). The RMC line was soon producing 80 percent of the plutonium buttons. It ran seven days a week, operated by shifts of four to six operators and a line manager.

The AEC raised production quotas in September 1953, and the Hanford Site began shipping plutonium buttons to the new Rocky Flats Plant in Colorado, which fabricated pits from plutonium buttons. The following year the Savannah River Site became operational. The finishing plant at the Savannah River Site did not manufacture pits, but just buttons, which it shipped to Rocky Flats. In 1949, the Plutonium Finishing Plant produced about 750 kilograms of plutonium; in 1959, some 3,500 kilograms were produced. Between 1957 and 1961, nine types of pits were produced. In 1960, with the RMC line operational, more than 4,000 kilograms was produced. Production peaked in 1965, when 4,500 kilograms was produced. The high production volume tended to saturate the air filters, with the result that a daily average of 18 microcuries (670 kBq) of plutonium was detected in stack releases in July 1957. This rose to 117 microcuries (4,300 kBq) in December, and 182 microcuries (6,700 kBq) by late 1958. A program of filter inspection and replacement was instituted, but daily averages remained high into 1959.

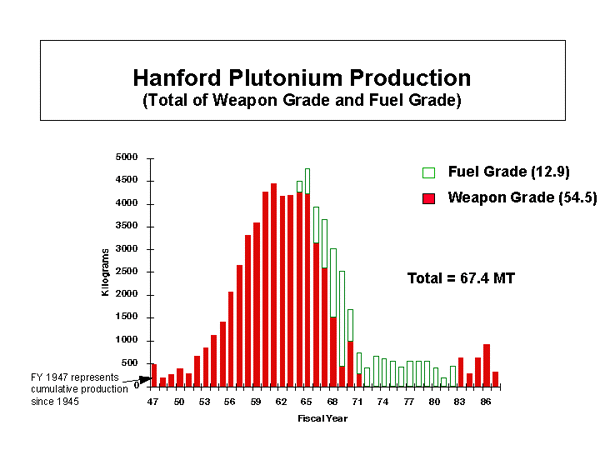
Hanford plutonium production from 1947 to 1988

On 8 January 1964, President Lyndon B. Johnson announced a reduced national requirement for nuclear weapons materials due to the large stockpile and the 1963 Partial Nuclear Test Ban Treaty, which ended atmospheric nuclear testing. Hanford began shutting down its production reactors, and the RMA line was taken out of service by the end of the year. In 1965, the AEC announced that all pit fabrication work would henceforth be undertaken at the Rocky Flats Site. With spare capacity, the plant managers began taking on non-defense related work.

At midnight on 31 December 1965, General Electric handed over management of the Hanford Site's chemical processing facilities, including the Plutonium Finishing Plant, to Isochem. On 5 September 1967, the Atlantic Richfield Hanford Company (ARHCO) took over. The RMA line was reactivated to produce mixed plutonium-oxide uranium-oxide (MOX) fuel for Hanford's Fast Flux Test Facility, while the RMC line processed fuel-grade plutonium from the N Reactor. The AEC was succeeded by the Energy Research and Development Administration (ERDA) in 1975, and it replaced ARHCO with Rockwell on 1 July 1977.

The Reagan administration initiated a nuclear arms build-up in 1989, and the Department of Energy, which succeeded the ERDA in 1977, restarted Hanford's PUREX plant. Plans were made to handle its product with the RMA line in case the new N Cell facility at the PUREX plant could not process the plutonium nitrate into plutonium oxide. However, the N Cell worked fine, and the RMA line was shut down for good in 1984. That year, DOE ordered the RMC line to prepare to restart production of weapons-grade components. This work commenced on 1 July 1985, and ran until October. After multiple repairs, it was reactivated in April 1986 and produced weapons-grade plutonium for the next six months. Another shutdown for a series of upgrades and repairs followed. The RMC line produced plutonium again from July 1988 to June 1989, when it was shut down for the last time. Between 1949 and 1989, the Plutonium Finishing Plant had produced more than 66 metric tons of plutonium.

== Non-defense work ==
Starting in the 1960s, the Plutonium Finishing Plant took on work in support of the nuclear power industry. In 1962, the AEC asked General Electric to explore the possibility of producing fuel-grade plutonium at the Plutonium Finishing Plant. The idea was that the AEC could buy plutonium produced as a byproduct from commercial reactors, which could then be sold for research or in plutonium-fueled reactors. The plutonium was extracted from spent fuel by Nuclear Fuel Services in New York, and delivered to Hanford in the form of plutonium nitrate.

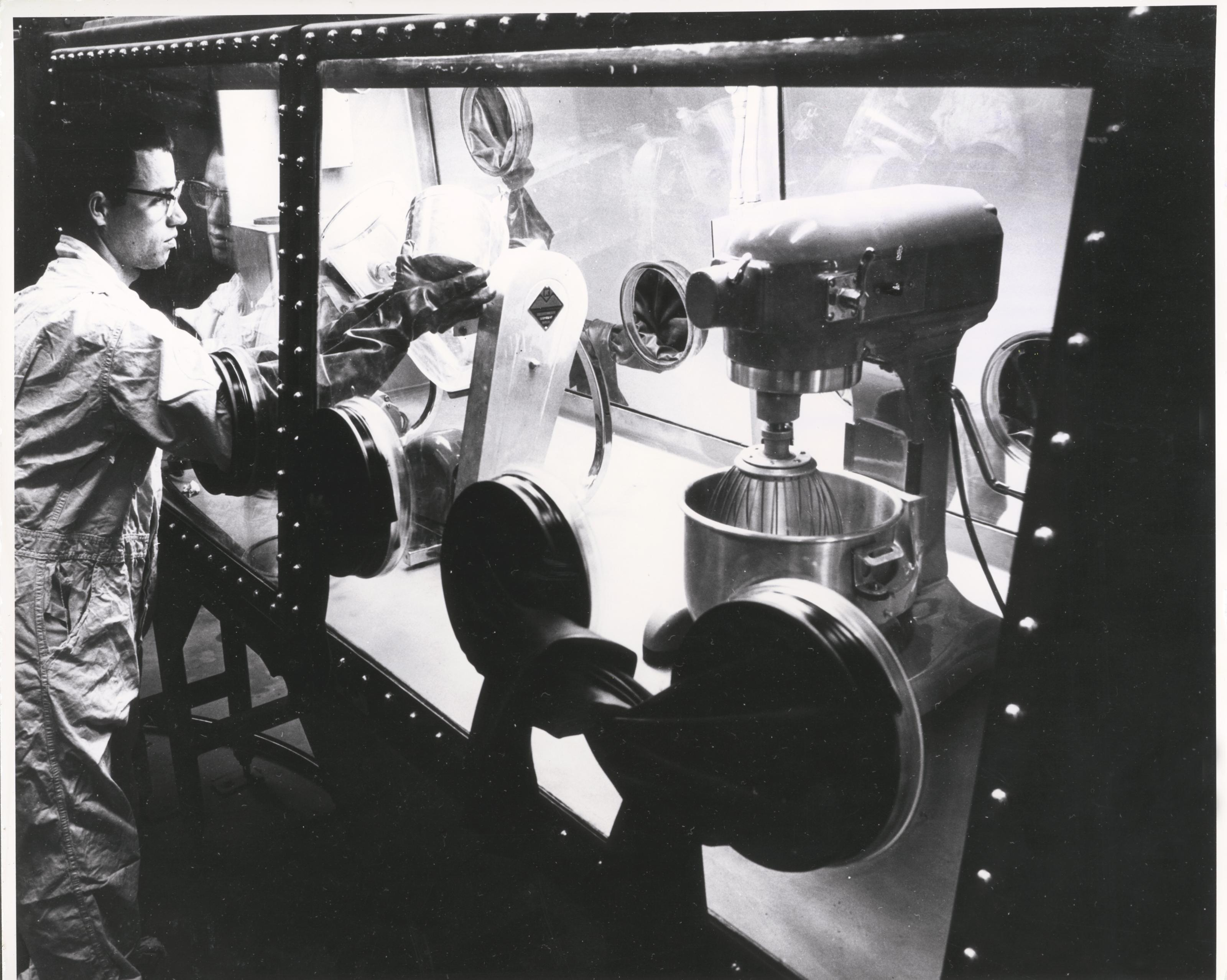
Mixing plutonium oxide powders in a glovebox

In September 1964, the Plutonium Finishing Plant began delivering non-defense plutonium oxide to Euratom. Fuel grade uranium was also supplied to Hanford's Critical mass Laboratory for experimental purposes, and to SEFOR (the Southwest Experimental Fast Oxide Reactor) in Arkansas, where research was undertaken into fast breeder reactors. In 1966, the Plutonium Finishing Plant began processing fuel-grade plutonium produced by the N Reactor. Customers included national and private laboratories and the commercial nuclear power industry. Between 1964 and 1982, Hanford produced 12.9 metric tons of fuel-grade plutonium.

In July 1971, the Plutonium Finishing Plant began fulfilling a large order for plutonium oxides for cores 1 and 2 of the Fast Flux Test Facility. This work was completed in April 1975. However, some batches contained large amounts of impurities. In 1977, the contract to produce oxides for cores 3 and 4 of the FFTF was awarded to the Savannah River Site. The oxides were shipped to the Plutonium Finishing Plant for sampling, blending, and re-packaging. In 1978, the DOE ordered the Plutonium Finishing Plant to cease non-defense work.

== Analytical laboratories ==
The safety of the Plutonium Finishing Plant depended on knowing the isotopic content of the plutonium and the quantities being handled. For this, the 234-5Z Building was provided with an analytical laboratory, which sampled the product at various stages. When the building was extended, a second laboratory, known as the developmental or plutonium chemistry laboratory was added. A small metallurgical laboratory operated from the building from 1952 to 1956, when it relocated to the 231-Z Building. All three laboratories originally used open-faced fume hoods, but over time most were replaced by gloveboxes.

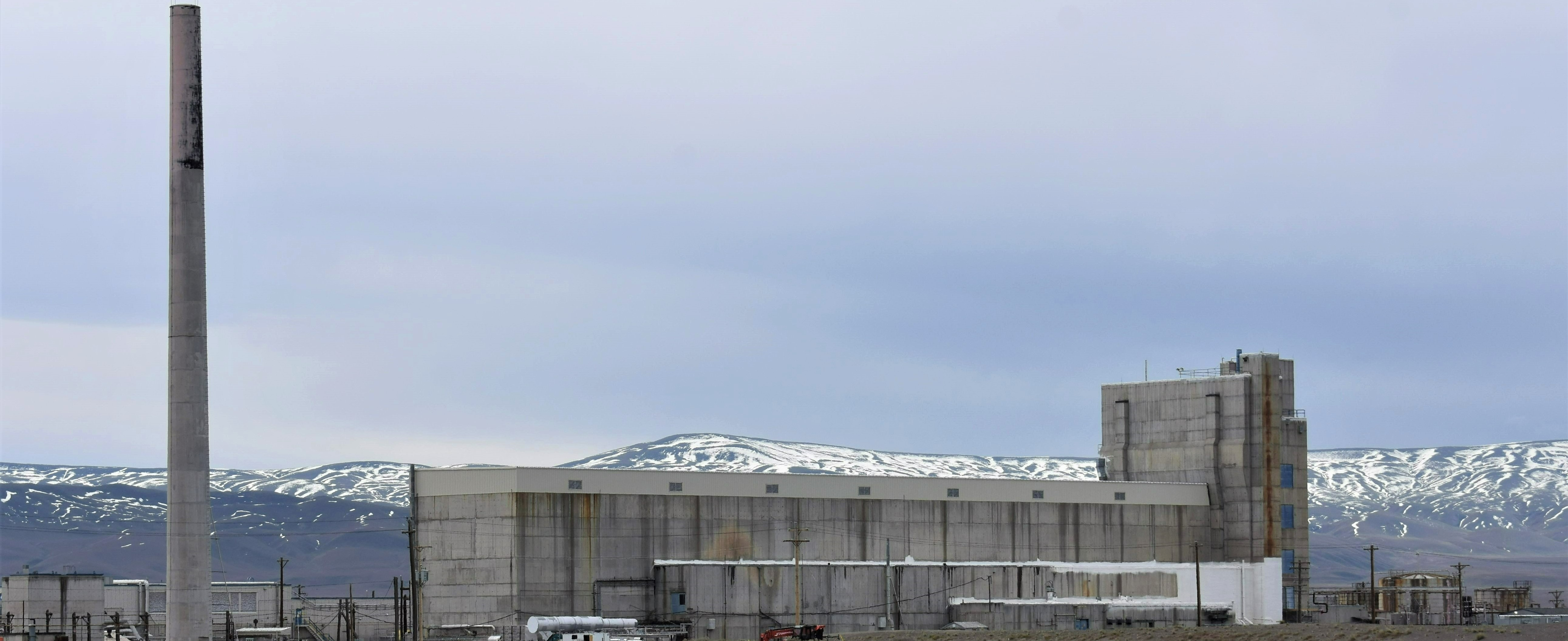
The Reduction-Oxidation Plant, better known as the REDOX, was the fourth of five processing "canyons" constructed in the central part of the Hanford Site.

The laboratories investigated potential improvements to the plutonium finishing process, such as recovering plutonium from waste materials. The wartime the bismuth phosphate process used to separate the plutonium from the uranium left the uranium in an unrecoverable state. The Metallurgical Laboratory had researched a promising new redox separation process, using hexone as a solvent.

As the new REDOX plant neared completion in 1950, experiments were carried out to devise a means of processing its product. In May 1951, the analytical laboratory went from two shifts per five-day week to four to keep pace with the increased production. The following April, it moved to a two-shift seven-day schedule. The laboratory workload increased in March 1953 when the 231-Z analytical laboratory closed and its workload was assigned to the 234-5Z analytical laboratory.

In the 1970s, the developmental laboratory's work increasingly focused on the handling of waste. Meanwhile, the analytical laboratory continued to support the Plutonium Reclamation Facility, the UO_{3} Plant and the RMC line through the 1980s and into the 1990s. The laboratories studied ways to analyze and stabilize the 8,000 containers of plutonium-bearing scrap that had been stored in the Plutonium Finishing Plant. The laboratories were closed when the stabilization project was completed.

== Recovery and recycling of plutonium ==
=== RECUPLEX facility ===
Plutonium was valuable, and reducing waste saved landfill dispatches and preserved the long-term radiological safety of the area by not burying the highly contaminated waste. Efforts were therefore made to recycle plutonium-bearing waste. By July 1951, Plutonium Finishing Plant chemists had devised a solvent extraction process called RECUPLEX (recovery of uranium and plutonium by extraction). The feed materials for the process were slag and crucible fragments, scrap powders from the RMA line, and oxidized plutonium turnings. The process used tributyl phosphate (PO(OC_{4}H_{9})_{3}) diluted with carbon tetrachloride (CCl_{4}). The process produced a plutonium nitrate solution with 80 to 100 grams of plutonium per liter, suitable for feeding into the RMA line. A semiworks demonstrated the feasibility of the process, albeit recovering uranium instead of plutonium, and the design of a permanent facility was completed by October 1953. Construction work began in May 1953 before the design was finished. After some delays, the facility was completed in March 1955.

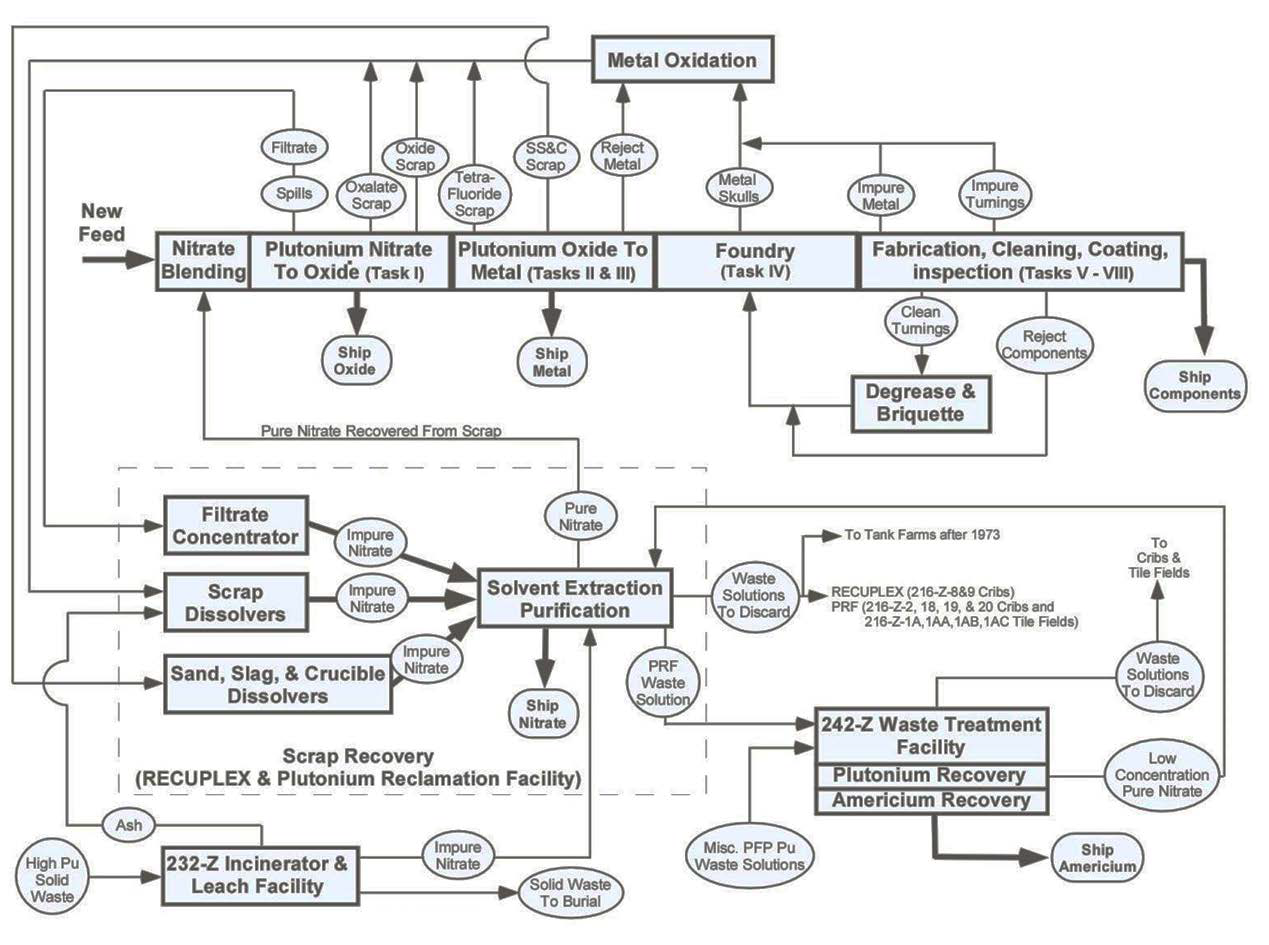
Plutonium Processing Cycle at the Plutonium Finishing Plant

In August 1955, its first month of operation, the RECUPLEX facility recovered 9.3 kilograms of plutonium. Starting in January 1957, it also processed PUREX feed that contained more than the usual amount of fission products. In March 1959, it set a record when 94 kilograms of plutonium were recovered. Increased demand led to the work week being extended from five to seven days in 1960. In May 1961, the facility received 72 kilograms of plutonium scrap from the Rocky Flats Site.

The high volume of work combined with the use of highly corrosive materials adversely affected the equipment, and breakdowns became common. Worse, radioactive materials began building up in hard-to-access nooks and crannies, and radiation levels inexorably climbed. On 7 April 1962, there was a serious criticality accident in the used solvent holding tank. Three workers were exposed to high levels of radiation, and all operations at the Plutonium Finishing Plant were temporarily halted. On 18 May, it was decided to close the RECUPLEX facility.

=== 232-Z Incinerator ===
In 1958, the Plutonium Finishing Plant engineers suggested building an incinerator to recover plutonium residue from combustible solid waste in the 231-Z and 234-5Z buildings such as cartons, rags, old clothes, filters, and rubber gloves. These would be burned and the plutonium wet leached from the ashes. It was estimated that about 6 kilograms of plutonium was being discarded with these sorts of waste each year. From June 1958 on, the Plutonium Finishing Plant began to store rather than bury solid waste in anticipation that an incinerator would be built. The following month, operators visited the Rocky Flats Site to inspect the incinerator there.

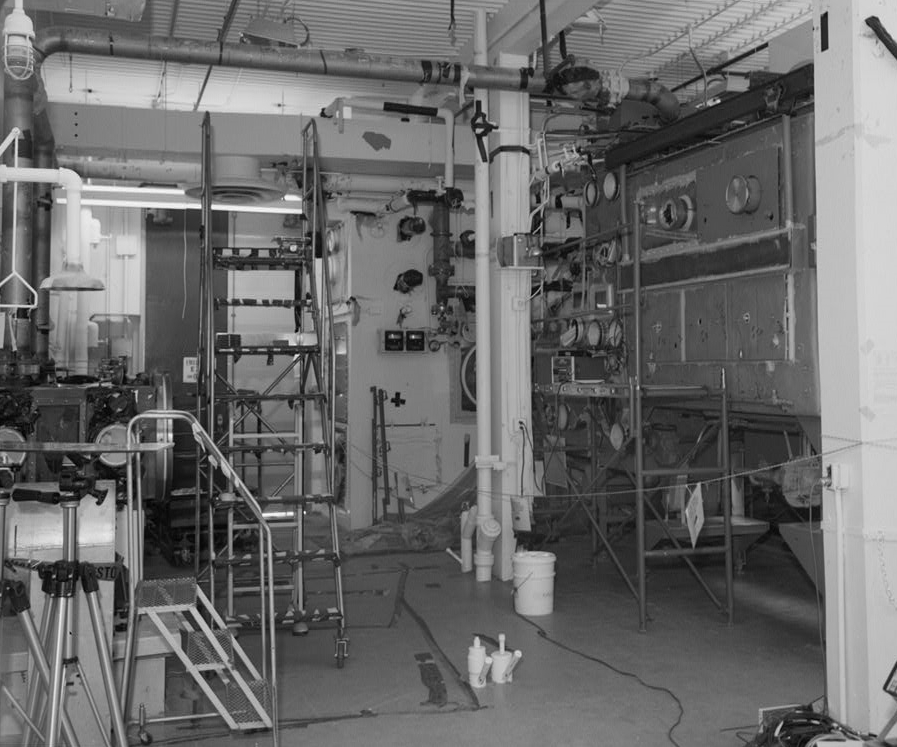
Process areas room of the 232-Z Incinerator

The new facility, the known as the 232-Z Incinerator, underwent several design modifications and was built between 1959 and 1961. Full-scale operations commenced on 8 January 1962. Initially, there was only one shift per day due to a shortage of staff, and only 42 cartons of waste were incinerated in the first three months of operation. The conveyor belt began to fail after just two, frequently slipping and jamming, and there were frequent shutdowns for repairs in 1963.

At the same time, cartons of waste were accumulating at a rate of 50 boxes a month, and by the time the incinerator returned to full service on 17 September, there was a backlog of 1,535 boxes. The steel conveyor belt was replaced by a nichrome one on 22 October 1963, which in turn it was replaced by an inconel one on 11 February 1964, that had to be replaced on 20 April and again on 14 July. There were also numerous interruptions due to other mechanical problems. In contrast, the leaching process worked quite well.

In July 1965, the incinerator was shut down for repairs, and it was not restarted until 17 October 1966. By this time, it had recovered 157 kilograms of plutonium. The new furnace was designed to operate at a slightly lower temperature of 800 °C (1,470 °F). It failed on 18 July 1967, but was restarted on 6 October and ran for over two years. It was rebuilt and restarted in 1970, and ran continuously for the next three years. It was never restarted after the 1973 shutdown.

=== 242-Z Waste Treatment Facility ===
While the RECUPLEX facility dealt with solid waste and the 232-Z Incinerator with combustible waste, there remained the problem of liquid waste. By the end of 1959, the 216-Z-9 Crib, a 20-foot (6.1 m) deep underground cavern southeast of the 234-5Z Building where aqueous wastes were stored, had accumulated 14,638 grams of plutonium. The 242-Z Waste Treatment Facility was built to handle this.

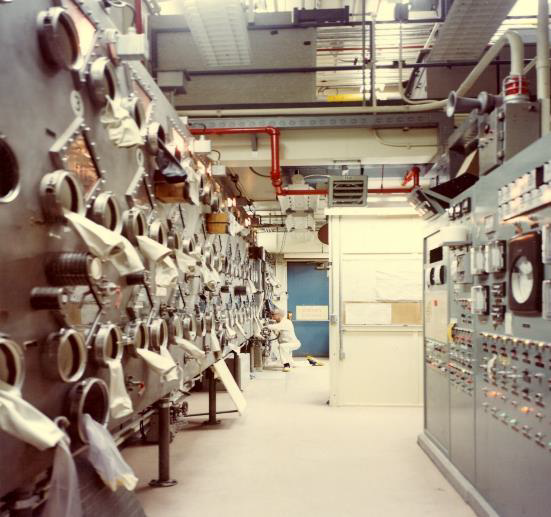
Harold McCluskey working in the 242-Z Waste Treatment Facility

The 242-Z Waste Treatment Facility was a 1,000-square-foot (93 m^{2}) building on the southern side of the 234-5Z Building's southeastern corner. It held a cation exchange column designed to process 150 liters (33 imp gal; 40 U.S. gal) per hour, a solvent exchange column to process the RECUPLEX waste stream at a rate of 125 liters (27 imp gal; 33 U.S. gal) per hour, two solvent extraction tanks, a product tank, and a sump tank. Construction was underway in April 1962 when it was halted on account of the RECUPLEX criticality accident. A review recommended some modifications, and the facility opened in late 1963.

In 1964, an americium recovery system was installed in a glovebox at the 242-Z Waste Treatment Facility. This took acidic aqueous waste from the solvent column, neutralized the acidity with sodium hydroxide (NaOH), and extracted both plutonium and americium with dibutyl butylphosphonate (DBBP) (C_{12}H_{27}O_{3}P) and carbon tetrachloride. This was then stripped with water to remove the americium and dilute the nitric acid (HNO_{3}), concentrated in a cation, washed with ammonium nitrate (NH_{4}NO_{3}), and packaged in cans as americium nitrate (Am(NO_{3})_{3}). In 1966, 1967, and 1968, the 242-Z Waste Treatment Facility processed an average of 65,000 liters (14,000 imp gal; 17,000 U.S. gal) of aqueous waste per month, which yielded an average of 200 grams of plutonium and 7 to 8 grams of americium per month. The following year, this was converted into a continuous batch process.

On 30 August 1976, there was a serious accident when the contents of a glovebox containing americium and plutonium exploded, seriously injuring an operator, Harold McCluskey, who suffered facial cuts, chemical burns, eye damage, and americium deposition. The accident prompted a series of reviews and evaluations that led to the DOE decision to close most of the Plutonium Finishing Plant facilities. The 242-Z Waste Treatment Facility was closed permanently.

=== Plutonium Reclamation Facility ===
In 1960, General Electric proposed building a multi-purpose plutonium reclamation facility at the Hanford Site to deal with plutonium scrap. The new facility would be larger, safer, and more flexible than RECUPLEX. The AEC considered sending scrap to the Rocky Flats Site for processing, but in view of the potential safety hazards and the difficulty of properly accounting for material, approval was granted. Construction of the Plutonium Reclamation Facility commenced in June 1962 and was completed in December 1963. The new facility was more efficient than RECUPLEX because it used a remotely operated continuous treatment and recycling process. It was also much safer because instead of relying on administrative controls, it used geometrically favorable equipment in which a concentration of plutonium sufficient to cause a criticality event was impossible.

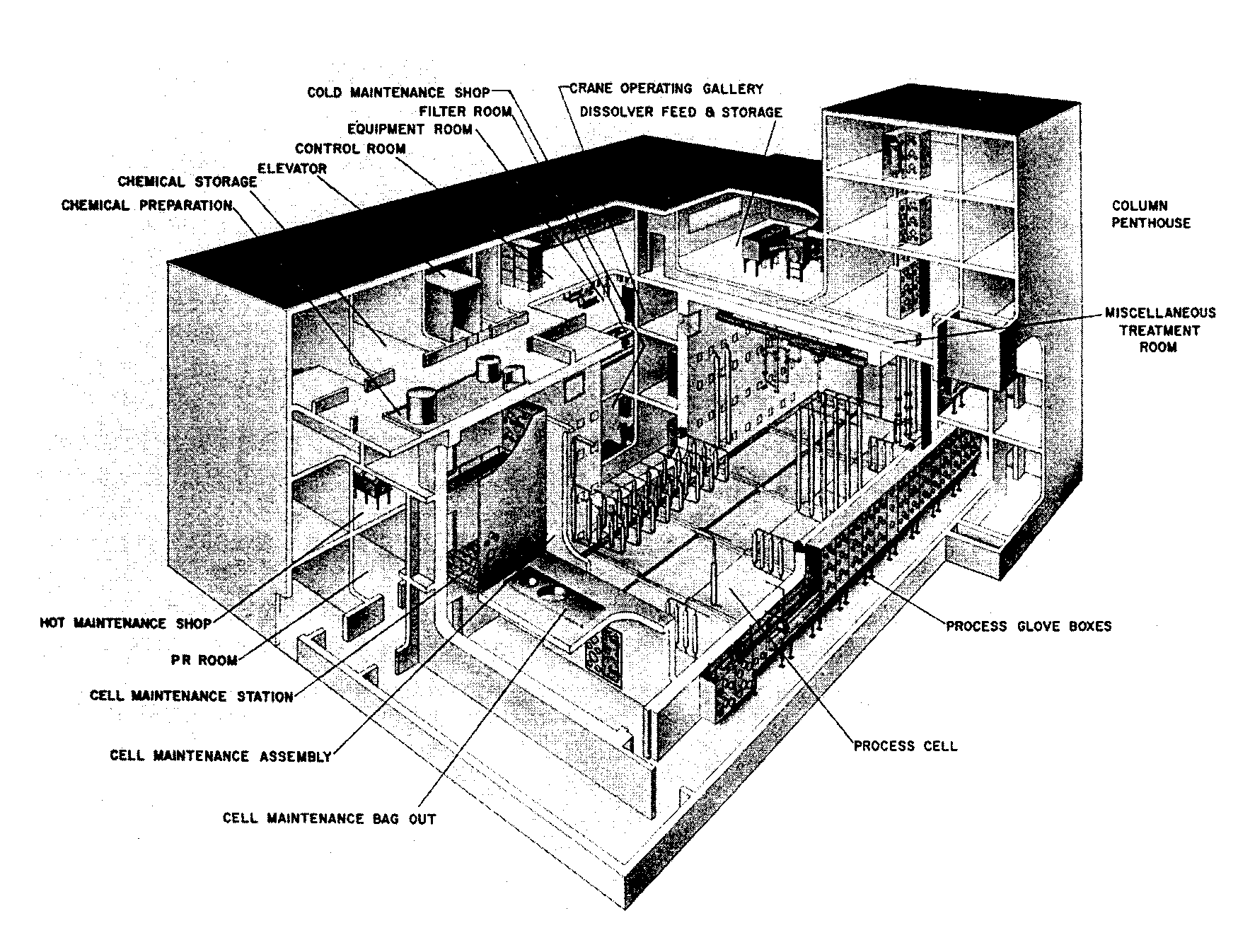
Schematic of the Plutonium Reclamation Facility

The building, known as the 236-Z Building, was four stories high, with a two-story penthouse, and made from reinforced concrete. Concrete walls 10 inches (250 mm) thick permitted as much as 20% plutonium-240 and 10% plutonium-241 content to be handled. Glovebox shielding allowed for 12% plutonium-240 and 3.2% plutonium-241. Four main gloveboxes were located on the first two floors with access to dissolver pots, hot plates, condensers, and furnaces. An IBM 7090 computer was used to keep track of the scrap inventory.

Processing commenced on 6 May 1964. Solvent extraction was accomplished by remote operation in the large central cell known as the canyon with a solution of tributyl phosphate and carbon tetrachloride. Nitric acid and hydroxylamine (NH_{2}OH) were then used to separate the product in the form of plutonium nitrate, which was concentrated and then sent to the RMA and RMC lines for processing. A cluster of five (later six) gloveboxes on the fourth floor provided miscellaneous treatment processes. By 1969, the Plutonium Reclamation Facility was handling 4,000 items of scrap per month. This included ash from the 232-Z Incinerator and magnesium oxide crucibles used by the RMC line.

By mid-1975, the facility was plagued with frequent breakdowns, and was reported to be operating at only 25 percent efficiency. It was shut down for maintenance and upgrades from late December 1975 to 15 March 1976. It only ran for a short time before operations were halted on 30 April by a strike. Processing resumed when the strike ended in late August, but soon after, all Plutonium Finishing Plant work was suspended for nineteen months due to the 30 August explosion at the 242-Z Waste Treatment Facility. A long period of cleanup, maintenance, and upgrade followed before the Plutonium Reclamation Facility restarted on 1 January 1984 and ran until 18 November 1984. It operated again from 17 December 1984 to 31 May 1985; 23 December 1985 to 31 March 1986; 1 July 1987, to 18 December 1987; and finally from July 1988 to June 1989. A training run was conducted in 1994, but it never operated again.

=== Z-9 Crib mining ===
General Electric took spoil samples from Z-9 Crib in 1965 and 1966 and it was estimated that there was 27.5 kilograms of plutonium there. It concluded that the radioactive waste posed a potential criticality hazard. Plans were prepared to use mining equipment to remove the top layer of soil and leach out the plutonium with a mixture of nitric and hydrofluoric acids. The leach soil would then be packed in 50-U.S.-gallon (190 L) drums and buried. After further sampling in 1967, the 1965 figure was revised upward to 196 kilograms. The removal of the contaminated soil began on 17 August 1976. The soil from the north half of the crib yielded 28.5 kilograms of plutonium. The south half was then mined and produced another 29.5 kilograms. Work ended on 14 July 1978.

== Cleanup and demolition ==
Before the last four major facilities at the plant could be demolished, approximately 18 metric tons of plutonium-bearing material was stabilized between 1996 and 2004. Legacy plutonium from plant systems was removed by 2005, and all weapons-grade plutonium was shipped out of the plant to the Savannah River Site by 2009. Some 238 large pieces of contaminated equipment, including gloveboxes and fume hoods, and approximately 50 plutonium processing tanks, were removed. Numerous plant support facilities, including the vault complex used for the secure storage of plutonium, were demolished by 2012. This preparatory work has been called the most hazardous cleanup work at the Hanford Site, and PFP has been called Hanford's most hazardous building.

Demolition of the Plutonium Finishing Plant at the Hanford Site

Demolition work began in 2016. The Department of Energy's PFP Closure Project intended to have the entire facility cleaned and destroyed down to a concrete slab in 2017, with all contaminated materials moved to other sites. Open-air demolition of the plant's last four remaining major facilities began in November 2016, starting with the Plutonium Reclamation Facility. Demolition of the second major facility, the Americium Recovery Facility, also known as the "McCluskey Room" because of his 1976 accident, began in January 2017, and was completed in March 2017. Demolition of the third remaining major facility, the ventilation stack and fan house, was completed in July 2017.

Demolition of the last facility, the main building, commenced in July 2017. In December, work was put on hold after contamination was found as far away as 10 miles (16 km) from the site and found in two car air filters that were checked by a Hanford contractor and deemed clean, but when rechecked by an independent lab were found to have small amounts of radioactive contamination. Work restarted in 2019, and all demolition and cleanup work was completed in November 2021. The final activities involved the safe removal and disposal of the rubble. The PFP Closure Project was completed in January 2022.
