= Economy of Toulouse =

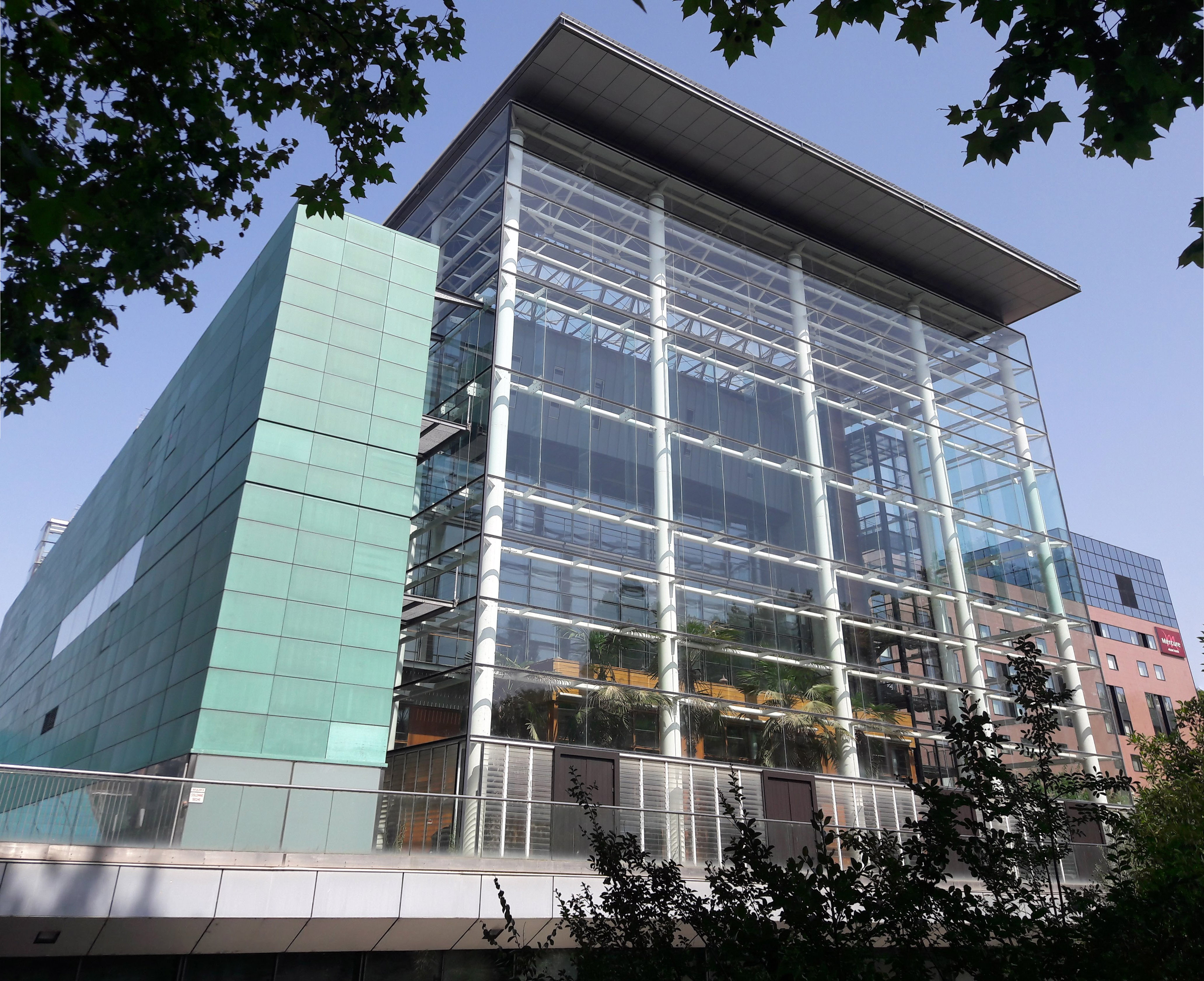
Pierre-Baudis Congress Center

The economy of the French city of Toulouse is mainly linked to the industries of aeronautics and aerospace. The agglomeration's GDP is approximately 30 billion euros. In 2003, Toulouse was also characterized by a debt rate that was one of the lowest in Europe for a city of its size.

In 1999, the total number of people working in Toulouse was 216,480.

The unemployment rate was 9.9% in 2005 and was estimated in December 2006 at 9.1%, slightly higher than the national average (8.6%).

== Agriculture, market gardening ==
Like most large cities located on the alluvial plain, Toulouse has developed a market garden culture that allows it to have a regular supply of fresh produce. Thus, the southeast and north of the city are areas traditionally devoted to this type of cultivation. However, this practice is tending to diminish, as the available surface area is being reduced by the pressure of land ownership. Toulouse is also known for the cultivation of violets, for their flowers and perfume.

== Industry ==
Unlike other large cities in France, Toulouse did not experience the Industrial Revolution in the 18th and 19th centuries. This specificity kept it away from the major political and strategic decisions for many decades until the arrival of aeronautics in the early 20th century, which reversed the situation. Today, there are few traditional industries in Toulouse, such as the chemical, metallurgical or textile sectors. The AZF factory explosion contributed to the disappearance of one of the city's few factories. What kept Toulouse on the sidelines of major French cities has, over the course of the 20th century, become one of its main assets. In the absence of traditional sectors, the city did not experience crises like Lille and so many other northern European cities after World War II.

=== Aeronautics and aerospace ===
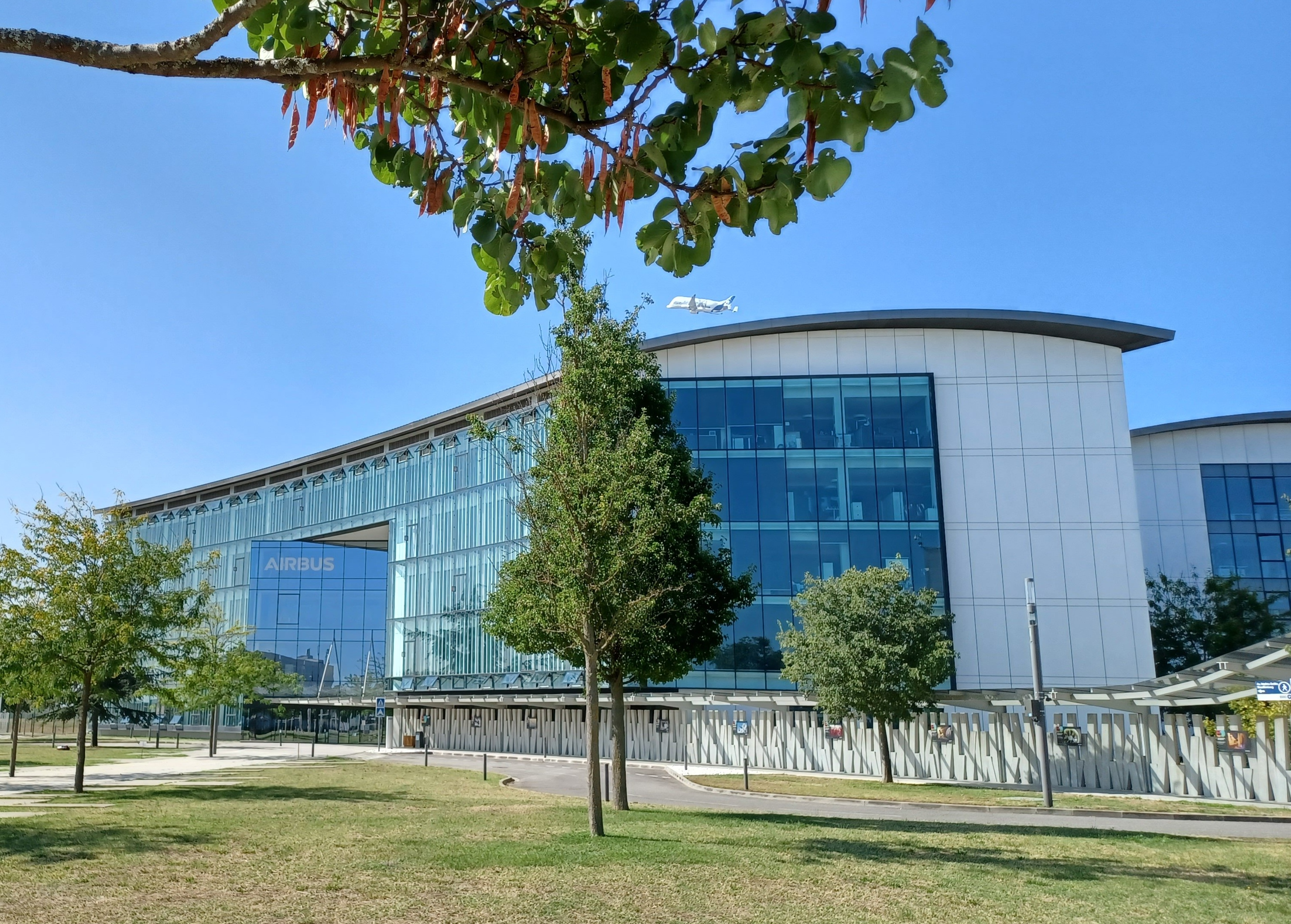
Global headquarters of Airbus at Toulouse-Blagnac Airport

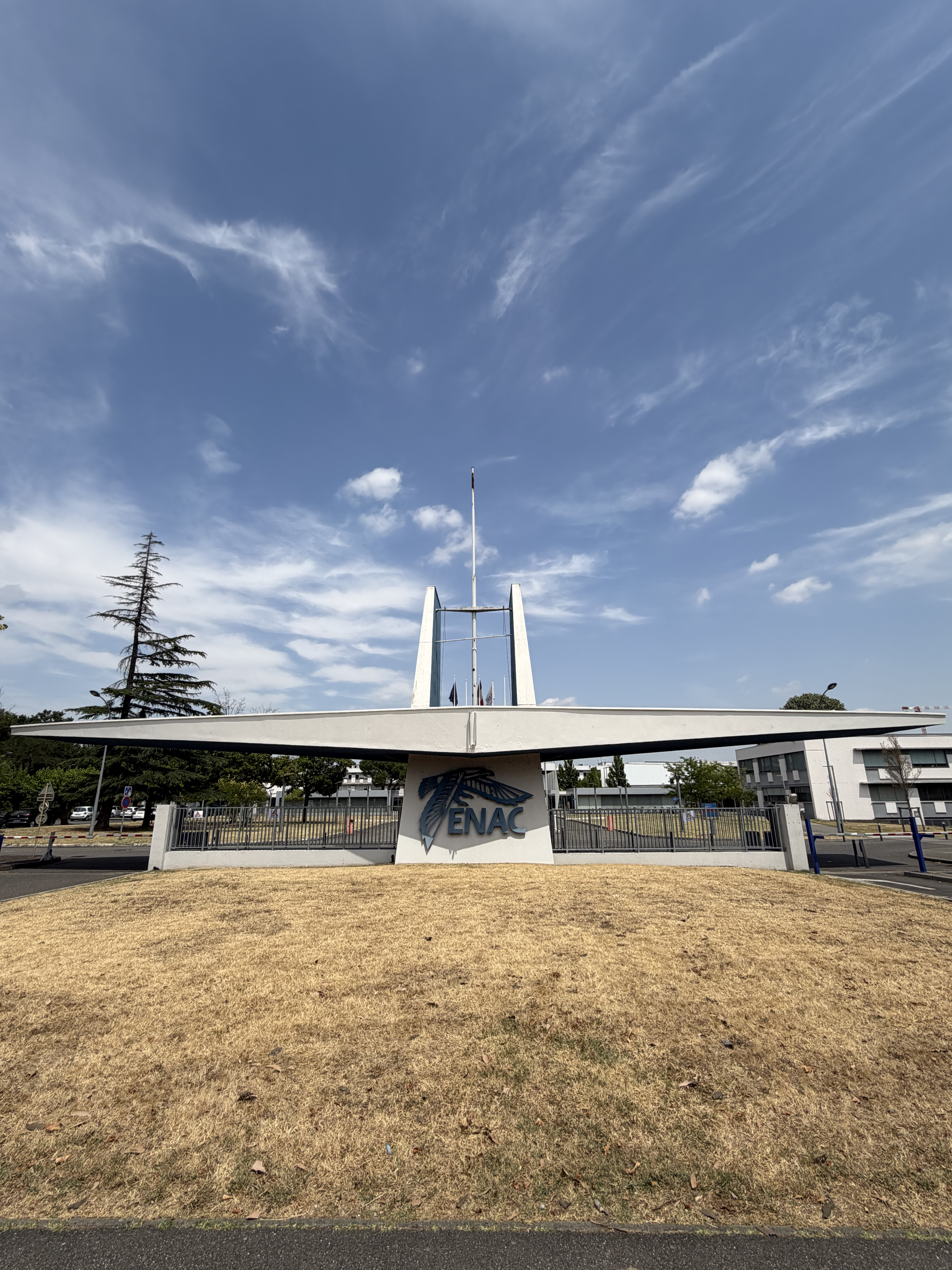
ENAC entrance

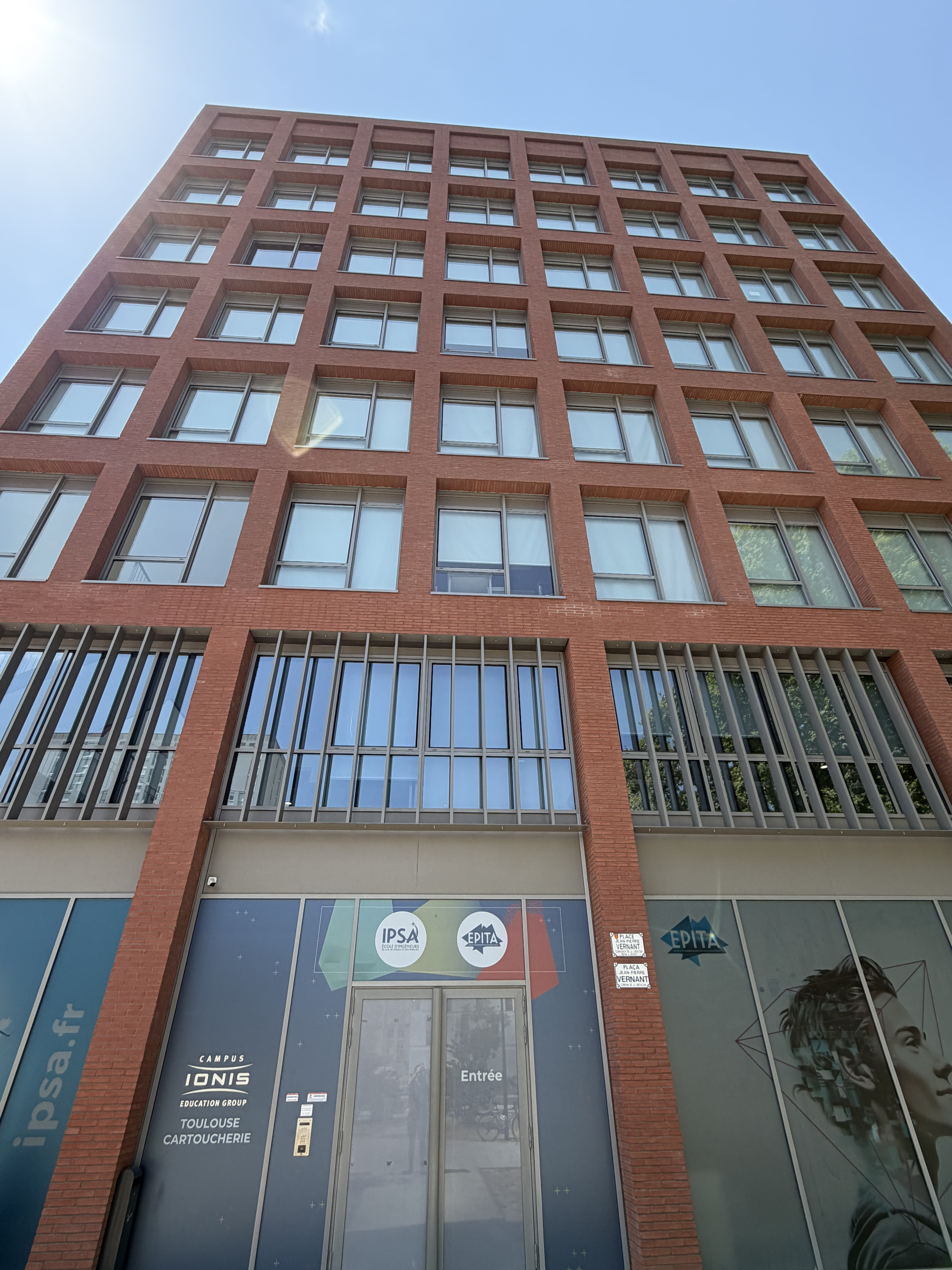
IPSA entrance

The city has a long history linked to aviation, because well before the First World War, Clément Ader (a native of Muret, south of Toulouse) invented, in 1890, several airplanes: Éole (Avion), the Zephyr (Avion II) and the Aquilon (Avion III). With the First World War, aeronautical activities were relocated to Toulouse because the city was considered far enough from the front lines.

On July 31, 1963, the State began a policy of decentralisation, and the Toulouse region took on a central role as the centre of aeronautics in France, by CNES to Rangueil (south of the city). Following the establishment of the CNES, engineering schools and laboratories began to set up in Toulouse, such as Sup'Aéro, CERT, ENAC, IPSA and the Laboratory for Analysis and Architecture of Systems (LAAS), to provide the CNES with researchers. A subsidiary of the Lagardère-Matra group, now Airbus Defence and Space, is located on the Palays site in the southeast of the city. This company, linked to Airbus Group (Airbus parent company) is a leader in the field of observation satellites and is involved in the SPOT satellite and its military version, Helios. Airbus Defence and Space is also involved in ERS, which monitors the planet's environment, and the SoHO program, which conducts research on the sun. Electronic control systems for the Ariane launches vehicle are also produced in Toulouse.

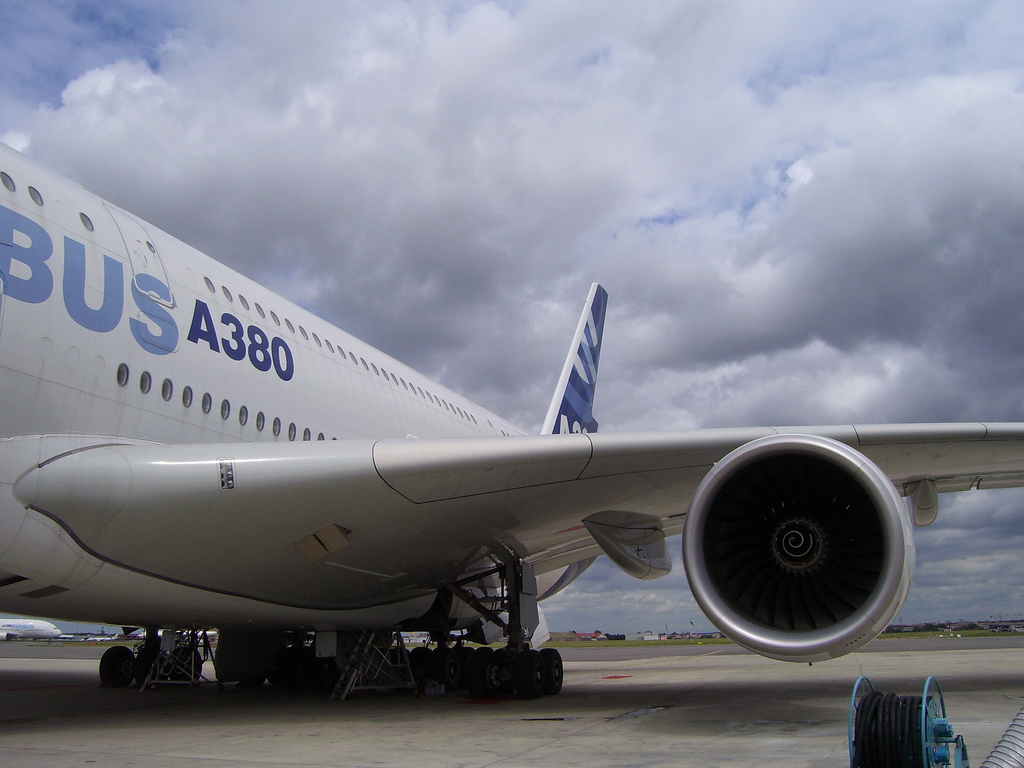
Toulouse, final construction city for the A380

In 1998, at the other end of the city, in the Candie area, the aerospace company Thales Alenia Space was established. In 2002 nearly 10,000 people, roughly half of the personnel in France working in the space sector, worked in Toulouse. Many small-to-medium enterprises (SMEs) and SMIs have joined the industrial fabric of the large aerospace and aeronautics firms.

Toulouse is the European centre of aeronautics and aerospace, and the headquarters of Airbus Industries. Along with Hamburg (Germany), Toulouse is one of the two European centers chosen by Airbus for the design, assembly and testing of its aircraft, including the A380. The plant is located to the west of Toulouse, straddling the Saint-Martin-du-Touch district and the neighboring town of Blagnac. In 2004, this site was confirmed with the installation of the AéroConstellation, which houses the assembly hangars for the wide-body aircraft. In a few years, the new Toulouse Aerospace will open on a 40-hectare site (120,000 m^{2}) on the site of the old Montaudran runways, with the headquarters of the Galileo navigation system.

=== Chemistry ===
Located mainly in the southern part of the city, the chemical cluster includes companies in the heavy chemicals (SNPE, Groupe Etienne Lacroix, Isochem and Raisio), pharmaceutical and paint sectors in Auterive. Toulouse's chemical cluster was very active until the disaster of September 21, 2001: the explosion at the AZF plant killed 30 people and injured about 2,500, as well as causing considerable material damage (in particular to the University of Toulouse-Le Mirail, the Mirail, Empalot, La Reynerie and Rangueil neighborhoods and the Marchand psychiatric hospital). However, chemistry is an old industry in Toulouse with the SNPE, which was originally called the Poudrerie and was located on the Ile du Ramier. This activity has since tended to reorient itself towards fine chemistry and pharmaceutical chemistry.

=== Computer Science ===
Numerous companies in the sector are located in Toulouse, including Altran, Atos Origin, Capgemini, IBM, Neo-Soft Services, Osiatis, Sopra Group, Steria and Unilog. The American microprocessor manufacturer Intel opened a European research and development center for smartphone development in early 2012.

Since the end of 2001, the Toulouse Métropole urban community has had a metropolitan telecommunications infrastructure (IMT). Composed of 5 loops totaling 77 km of optical fiber, the ITM extends over the Toulouse Métropole area from north to south and from east to west around Toulouse, from Blagnac to Labège and from L'Union to Tournefeuille. Passing mainly through the Toulouse metro, the ring road and the Canal du Midi, each cable is made up of 144 dark optical fibers, each pair of fibers offering a capacity of 2.5 Gbit/s in both directions.

== Tertiary sector ==
The city is an important center of tertiary activities. A regional business district, Compans-Caffarelli, was created to meet the demand for offices in the city. This district includes 200,000 square meters of office space, a shopping center with 40 boutiques, a 4-star hotel, a convention center, and an administrative center.

The creation of a new multimodal hub in the Marengo-Périoles-Raynal sector is being studied. This hub will become the city's international business district.

=== Finance and insurance ===
The district has seen the establishment of regional branches of banks and insurance companies such as Crédit Lyonnais or AXA. Many national and international banks and insurance companies are present in Toulouse. The Courtois Bank is a Toulouse bank and the Mutuelle du Rempart is also a Toulouse insurance company. This sector of activity is taking an increasing part in the economic activity of the city, representing in 2021 some 14,410 jobs (including the real estate sector).

=== Stores ===
Stores in the city center include both typical Toulouse shops and those of major brands. The most popular shopping areas in the city center include rue d'Alsace-Lorraine, rue Saint-Rome, rue des Changes, rue du Taur, rue Saint-Antoine-du-T, rue des Filatiers, and the Saint-Georges district, which is home to a renovated shopping mall with more than 50 stores that opened in 2006. There are luxury boutiques in the Victor-Hugo district and in the Saint-Etienne district (antiques district). Other neighborhoods are also undergoing commercial change, such as the Bourse district. The pedestrianization of the city center due to the arrival of the metro aims to encourage the commercial development of the historic center.

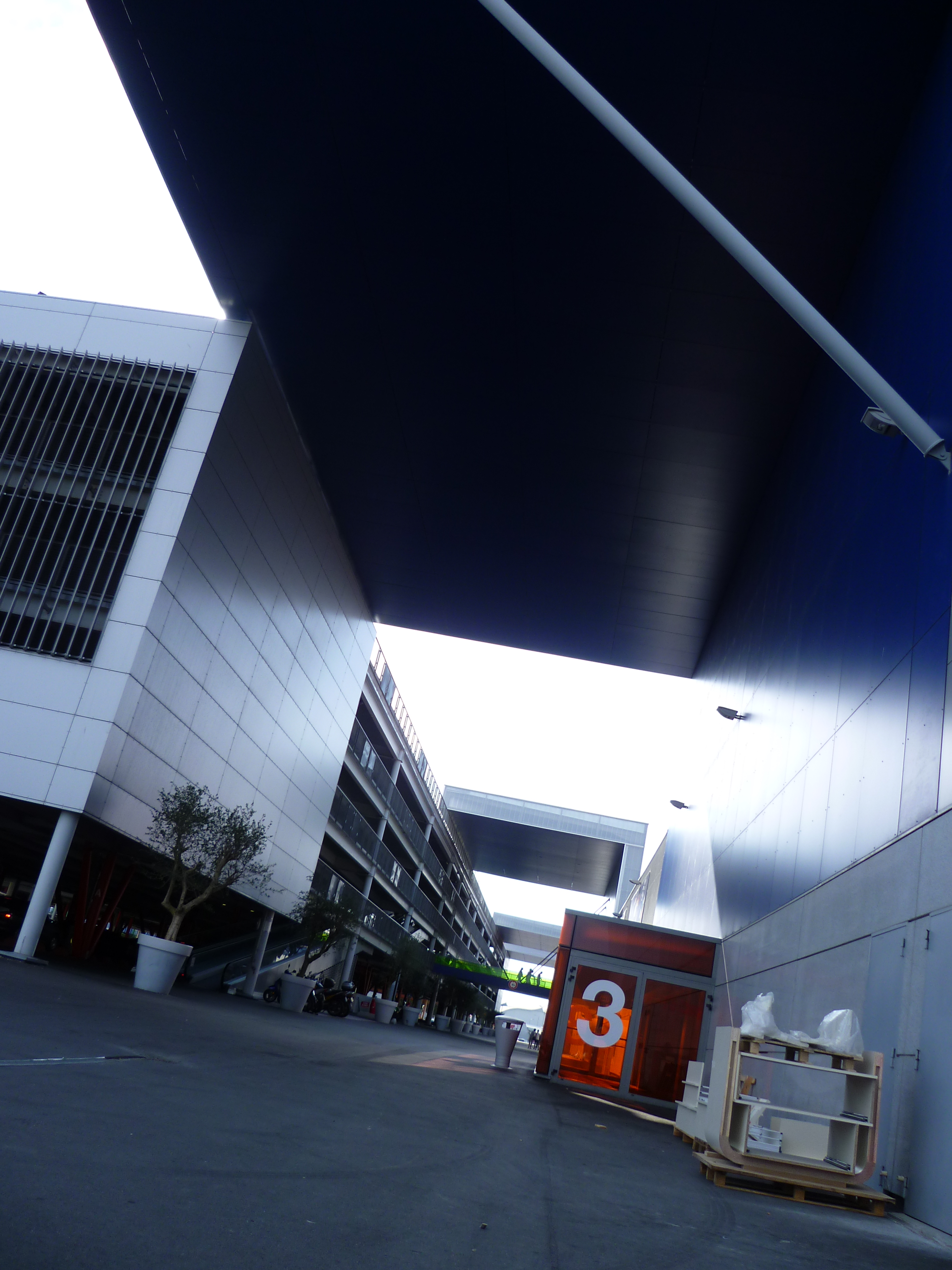
Shopping center of Blagnac

The agglomeration is surrounded by numerous shopping centers such as the Grand Porte shopping center in Toulouse-Portet-sur-Garonne, the Labège 2 shopping center in Toulouse-Labège (80 stores), the Carrefour Toulouse Purpan shopping center with 45 stores in the Purpan district, the Espace Gramont shopping center with 100 stores the Roques shopping center in Roques-sur-Garonne, the Blagnac shopping center in Blagnac, the Saint-Orens shopping center in Saint-Orens-de-Gameville, the Fenouillet shopping center in Fenouillet, the Basso-Cambo shopping center (with 30 stores including Hyper Casino and Giga Store) in the Reynerie district, as well as a Val Tolosa project in Plaisance-du-Touch.

By 2010, 100,000 square meters of additional commercial space were planned to be added to the plethora already present in the entire agglomeration. A 30,000 square meter shopping center is to be created in the Toulouse area, a brand village in Nailloux, about 30 kilometers away, as well as the expansion of existing commercial zones are also planned.

=== Tourism ===
The city has numerous museums and festivals (including Marathon des mots, Rio Loco, and gay pride) known throughout France and Europe. In 2006, 5 million tourists came to visit the city each year, including a little over 2.5 million for business tourism, making Toulouse the seventh most visited city in France after Paris, Lyon, Lourdes, Nice, Strasbourg and Bordeaux. Toulouse became the fourth most visited city in France in 2013

Business tourism and conventions account for 80% of this activity, but in recent years, leisure tourism has grown. The city applied for the title of European Capital of Culture for 2013, but in the end Marseille won the title by one vote.

The opening in August 2007 of the Casino-théâtre de Toulouse, the largest in southwestern France, contributed to the city's tourism development.
