= Neptunium(IV) nitrate =

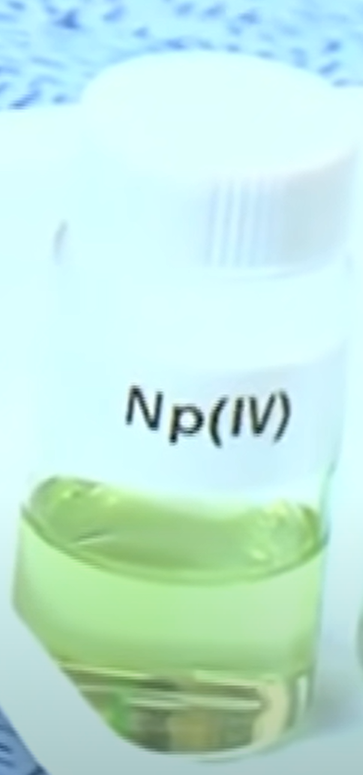

Names
- Other names Neptunium tetranitrate

Identifiers
CAS Number	25933-55-5
3D model (JSmol)	Interactive image
ECHA InfoCard	100.043.033
EC Number	247-352-3
- InChI: InChI=1S/4NO3.Np/c4*2-1(3)4;/q4*-1;+4 Key: SSHOWSNFBYZAEF-UHFFFAOYSA-N
- SMILES: [N+](=O)([O-])[O-].[N+](=O)([O-])[O-].[N+](=O)([O-])[O-].[N+](=O)([O-])[O-].[Np+4]

Properties
Chemical formula	Np(NO_{3})_{4}
Molar mass	485.02
Appearance	Grey crystals
Solubility in water	Soluble

Hazards
- GHS labelling
Signal word	Warning

Related compounds
Related compounds	Plutonium(IV) nitrate
- Except where otherwise noted, data are given for materials in their standard state (at 25 °C [77 °F], 100 kPa). Infobox references

Neptunium(IV) nitrate is an inorganic compound, a salt of neptunium and nitric acid with the chemical formula Np(NO_{3})_{4}. The compound forms gray crystals, dissolves in water, and forms crystal hydrates.

== Synthesis ==
Addition of dilute nitric acid to freshly prepared neptunium(IV) hydroxide:

Np(OH)_{4} + 4 HNO_{3} → Np(NO_{3})_{4} + 4 H_{2}O

== Physical properties ==
Neptunium(IV) nitrate forms gray hygroscopic crystals.

It is soluble in water.

It forms a crystal hydrate of the composition Np(NO_{3})_{4}•2H_{2}O.
