= Harold McCluskey =

American chemist involved in a radiation exposure accident in 1976

Harold R. McCluskey
- Born: Harold Ralph McCluskey; July 12, 1912; Decatur, Nebraska, U.S.
- Died: August 17, 1987 (aged 75); Puyallup, Washington, USA
- Occupation: Chemical operations technician
- Employer: Atlantic Richfield Hanford Co.
- Known for: Surviving americium radiation exposure
- Spouse: Ella Morrow (m. 1936)
- Children: 2

Harold Ralph McCluskey (July 12, 1912 – August 17, 1987) was a chemical operations technician at the Hanford Plutonium Finishing Plant in Washington State; he is known for surviving exposure to the highest dose of radiation from americium ever recorded. He became known as the "Atomic Man".

== Early life ==
McCluskey was born in Decatur, Nebraska, and attended Riverside High School. He then worked as a mechanic and a farmer and in 1936 married Ella Morrow. In 1948 he moved to Prosser, Washington, and began working at the Hanford Site.

== Accident ==
On August 30, 1976, McCluskey, then 64, was exposed to 500 times the occupational standard for americium-241, a plutonium byproduct, as the result of an accident in a glove box resulting in an explosion. As nitric acid was added to a column containing an ion-exchange resin and americium, the chemicals exploded, blowing out "pieces of glass and plastic" (plexiglass) from the glove box. McCluskey was hit on the right side by a mixture of nitric acid, broken glass, americium and ion exchange resin, exposing him to at least 37 MBq of radioactivity.

== Treatment ==
McCluskey's clothing was removed and he was washed with water, then transferred to a decontamination facility where he was washed again and given one gram of Ca-DTPA. For the next week he had two baths per day, then he had one bath per day for two months. For the first five days he was treated with the calcium complex of DTPA, and over the next four years he was given a total of 583 grams of the zinc complex of DTPA. The treatment reduced the systemic deposition to 500 kBq instead of the estimated 19 MBq which would otherwise have been retained inside his body.

Because of risk of exposure to other persons, McCluskey was placed in isolation in the Hanford Emergency Decontamination Facility for five months and underwent chelation therapy using DTPA. By 1977, his body's radiation count had fallen by about 80%. When McCluskey returned home, friends and church members avoided him; his minister was moved to reassure people it was safe to be around him.

== Afterwards ==
Though McCluskey largely avoided the media, he sometimes appeared at lectures on the case. "He really wanted people to know what happened as long as it is rationally presented," Breitenstein said. Several times after the explosion, McCluskey spoke in favor of developing nuclear power, saying he saw his injuries as the result of "purely an industrial accident."

== Death ==
He died on August 17, 1987, of coronary artery disease in Puyallup, Washington. He had this disease before the accident, and a post mortem examination found no signs of cancer. At the time of his death, he had 55 kBq of americium in his soft tissues (27.9 kBq in the liver), 470 kBq in the mineral surfaces of the bones, and 20 kBq in his bone marrow.

== See also ==
- Anatoli Bugorski
- List of civilian radiation accidents
