= Americium(III) nitrate =

- Hydrate

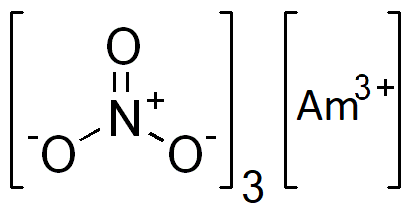

Names
- Other names Americium trinitrate, Americium nitrate

Identifiers
| CAS Number | 25933-53-3; 132499-98-0 (hydrate); 1809200-98-3 (trihydrate); 1809734-80-2 (nonahydrate) |
| 3D model (JSmol) | Interactive image |
| ChemSpider | 19989193 |
| EC Number | 247-351-8 |
| PubChem CID | 161508 |
- InChI: InChI=1S/Am.3NO3/c;3*2-1(3)4/q;3*-1 Key: NIYOQRBCYVLQML-UHFFFAOYSA-N
- SMILES: [N+](=O)([O-])[O-].[N+](=O)([O-])[O-].[N+](=O)([O-])[O-].[Am]

Properties
| Chemical formula | Am(NO_{3})_{3} |
| Molar mass | 429.08 |
| Solubility in water | Soluble |

Hazards
- GHS labelling
| Signal word | Warning |

Related compounds
| Related compounds | Terbium(III) nitrate |
- Except where otherwise noted, data are given for materials in their standard state (at 25 °C [77 °F], 100 kPa). Infobox references

Americium(III) nitrate is an inorganic compound, a salt of americium and nitric acid with the chemical formula Am(NO_{3})_{3}. The compound is soluble in water and radioactive.

== Synthesis ==
It can be formed by the reaction of americium metal and nitric acid:

8 Am + 30 HNO_{3} → 8 Am(NO_{3})_{3} + 3 N_{2}O + 15 H_{2}O

== Chemical properties ==
Americium(III) nitrate thermally decomposes to form americium(III) oxide.

It forms crystal hydrates.
