= Plutonium(IV) nitrate =

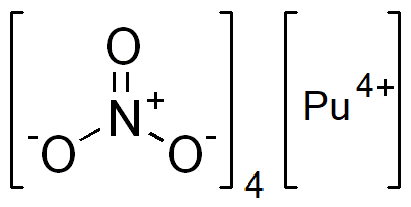

Names
- Other names Plutonium tetranitrate

Identifiers
CAS Number	13823-27-3; 53745-09-8 (^{238}Pu); (^{239}Pu): 13968-56-4; 55252-44-3 (hydrates); (trihydrate): 159472-02-3; (pentahydrate): 61204-24-8
3D model (JSmol)	Interactive image; (trihydrate): Interactive image; (pentahydrate): Interactive image
ChemSpider	14691097
- InChI: InChI=1S/4NO3.Pu/c4*2-1(3)4;/q4*-1;+4 Key: XOQIPTFXWRJKPQ-UHFFFAOYSA-N; (trihydrate): InChI=1S/4NO3.5H2O.Pu/c4*2-1(3)4;;;;;;/h;;;;5*1H2;/q4*-1;;;;;;+4 Key: OHJOWNGCXJSPGF-UHFFFAOYSA-N
- SMILES: [N+](=O)([O-])[O-].[N+](=O)([O-])[O-].[N+](=O)([O-])[O-].[N+](=O)([O-])[O-].[Pu+4]; (trihydrate): [N+](=O)([O-])[O-].[N+](=O)([O-])[O-].[N+](=O)([O-])[O-].[N+](=O)([O-])[O-].O.O.O.[Pu+4]; (pentahydrate): [N+](=O)([O-])[O-].[N+](=O)([O-])[O-].[N+](=O)([O-])[O-].[N+](=O)([O-])[O-].O.O.O.O.O.[Pu+4]

Properties
Molar mass	492.02
Appearance	Dark green crystals (hydrates)
Solubility in water	Soluble

Hazards
- Occupational safety and health (OHS/OSH)
Main hazards	Extremely toxic(T+) and radioactive; carcinogen
- GHS labelling
Pictograms	(GHS06: Toxic) (GHS09: Environmental hazard) (GHS07: Exclamation mark) (GHS08: Health hazard)
Signal word	Danger
NFPA 704 (fire diamond)	4 2 0

Related compounds
Related compounds	Neptunium(IV) nitrate
- Except where otherwise noted, data are given for materials in their standard state (at 25 °C [77 °F], 100 kPa). Infobox references

Plutonium (IV) nitrate is an inorganic compound, a salt of plutonium and nitric acid with the chemical formula Pu(NO_{3})_{4}. The compound dissolves in water and forms crystalline hydrates as dark green crystals.

== Synthesis ==
Crystals of dark green to black-green composition Pu(NO_{3})_{4}•5H_{2}O precipitate with a slow (months) evaporation of a solution of a plutonium (IV) compound in nitric acid.

== Physical properties ==
Plutonium (IV) nitrate forms a crystalline hydrate of the composition Pu(NO_{3})_{4}•5H_{2}O—dark green crystals of rhombic crystal structure, space group F dd2, cell parameters: a = 1.114 nm, b = 2.258 nm, c = 1.051 nm, Z = 8.

Crystalline hydrate melts in its own crystallization water at 95–100 °C.

It dissolves well in nitric acid (dark green solution) and water (brown solution). Also dissolves in acetone and ether.

== Chemical properties ==
When heated to 150–180 °C, it decomposes with autooxidation to plutonium (VI) with the formation of plutonyl nitrate (PuO_{2}(NO_{3})_{2}). Upon evaporation of concentrated nitric acid solutions of plutonium nitrate and alkali metal nitrates, double nitrates of the composition M_{2}[Pu(NO_{3})_{6}] are formed, where M = Cs^{+}, Rb^{+}, K^{+}, Tl^{+}, NH_{4}^{+}, analogous to ceric ammonium nitrate.

== Toxicity ==
Plutonium nitrate is both radioactive and extremely toxic due to its high solubility in water.
