= Isochem =

French chemical company

PMC Isochem
- Company type: S.A.S
- Industry: Chemicals and speciality products
- Founded: 1974
- Headquarters: Vert-le-Petit, France
- Key people: Björn Schlosser (CEO)
- Products: Chemicals
- Number of employees: 330 (2016)
- Subsidiaries: Framochem (Hongrie); Wychem (Grande-Bretagne); Isochem Gmbh (Allemagne)
- Website: www.isochem.eu

PMC Isochem is a French chemical company established in 1974 that specialises in custom chemical synthesis.

== History ==
In 1974, Isochem was established in Gennevilliers. Later, a site was opened in Pithiviers (formerly Agrifarm) in central France in 1977. The company was audited and approved by the U.S. Food and Drug Administration (FDA) in 1979 for the first time. In its early days, Isochem concentrated on the extraction and semisynthesis of natural substances, such as quinine.

In the 1990s, Isochem collaborated with Groupe SNPE (Société Nationale des Poudres et Explosifs) to undertake processes such as phosgenation. Isochem joined the Groupe SNPE, a French holding company that manufactures explosives in 1990. It later acquired the Vert-le-Petit site (formerly IRCHA Fine Chemicals and Propeptide) in 1991 and the Hungarian subsidiary Framochem in 2003.

Isochem was acquired by the German industrial holding company Aurelius AG in 2010. Isochem acquired Wychem (United Kingdom) in 2012. Isochem sold its Framochem subsidiary in 2014 and its Wychem subsidiary in 2016.

In 2017, PMC Group France, a wholly owned subsidiary of PMC Group International Inc., announced the acquisition of Isochem. This resulted in the name change to PMC Isochem.

== Industrial sites ==
Isochem runs sites at Vert-le-Petit with a head office and phosgene chemistry; Gennevilliers, with fractional distillation; Pithiviers for hydrogenation under pressure and waste processing; and Pont de Claix for agrochemicals. Most of the sites have a research and development team.
